= List of Shenzhen Metro stations =

System map

Shenzhen Metro is the metro system that serves the city of Shenzhen in Guangdong Province of the People's Republic of China. It is operated by the state-owned Shenzhen Metro Group (SZMC) except Line 4 and Line 13 which is run by MTR Corporation (Shenzhen). It was the seventh metro system to be built in mainland China; and having delivered 1297 million rides in 2016, it is one of the busiest metro systems in the world.

The current Shenzhen Metro system consists of seventeen lines:

- Line 1: Luohu – Airport East
- Line 2: Chiwan – Liantang
- Line 3: Futian Bonded Area – Pingdi Liulian
- Line 4: Futian Checkpoint – Niuhu
- Line 5: Chiwan – Grand Theater
- Line 6: Science Museum – Songgang
- Line 6 Branch: Guangmingcheng – SUAT
- Line 7: SZU Lihu Campus – Tai'an
- Line 8: Liantang – Xichong
- Line 9: Qianwan – Wenjin
- Line 10: Futian Checkpoint – Shuangyong Street
- Line 11: Bitou – Hongling South
- Line 12: Zuopaotai East – Songgang
- Line 13: Shenzhen Bay Checkpoint – Lisonglang
- Line 14: Gangxia North – Shatian
- Line 16: Yuanshan Xikeng – Tianxin
- Line 20: Airport North – Convention & Exhibition City

Below is a list of Shenzhen Metro stations in operation sorted by lines.

== Line 1 ==
Station name		Connections	Nearby bus stops	Distance km		Location
English	Chinese	Connections	Nearby bus stops	Distance km		Location
Luohu	罗湖	GS East Rail line (Note: System transfer via Lo Wu [through border check].) SZQ; 9 (via Renmin South) (Note: Out-of-station virtual transfer to Line 9 at Renmin South. This transfer will be counted as two separate journeys requiring two fares.)	1 7 8 12 17 18 28 38 61 82 83 97 101 102 108 205 207 215 302 306 309 321 330/Airport 1（机场1） 337 352 387 B842 K538沙井 K538松岗 K545 M373 M401 M468 M508 N2 N4 N7 N14 N15 N16 N18 Peak-time 73（高峰73） Airport 2（机场2）	0.00	0.00	Luohu
Guomao	国贸		1 11 12 14 17 82 83 97 101 102 204 205 211 215 220 229 302 306 307 336 337 351 381 387 E8 K204 M290 M360 M373 M383 M399 M402 M403 M404 M407 M408 M508 M509 N2 N7 N14 N15 N16 N18 N19 N21 Peak-time 73（高峰73）	1.10	1.10	Luohu
Laojie	老街	3	3 10 12 14 29 59 64 85 103 104 113 203 204 211 214 215 223 302 309 336 337 351 E8 K113 M399 M402 M481 M482 N3 N4 N6 N14 Sightseeing 1（观光1） Sightseeing 2（观光2）	0.63	1.73	Luohu
Grand Theater	大剧院	2 5; 9 11 (via Hongling South) (Note: Out-of-station virtual transfer to Line 9 at Hongling South. This transfer will be counted as two separate journeys requiring two fares.)	3 10 12 29 85 101 103 104 113 203 204 214 215 223 302 E8 K113 K204 M481 N3 N4 Sightseeing 1（观光1） Sightseeing 2（观光2）	0.90	2.63	Luohu
Science Museum	科学馆	6	3 4 8 12 75 113 202 203 204 393 395 B622 K113 M370 M383 M481 N3 N4 330/Airport 1（机场1）	1.43	4.06	Futian
Huaqiang Road	华强路	2 7 (via Huaqiang North) (Note: Out-of-station virtual transfer to Lines 2 and 7 at Huaqiang North. This transfer will be counted as two separate journeys requiring two fares.)	3 4 32 75 101 103 104 113 202 203 204 215 216 223 385 391 B812 E5 K113 K204 M344 M369 M374 M383 N3 N4 N12 N17 Peak-express 20（高快20） Peak-time 106（高峰106） Sightseeing 1（观光1） Sightseeing 2（观光2） Sightseeing 3（观光3）	1.00	5.06	Futian
Gangxia	岗厦	10	3 4 9 14 38 62 63 80 103 202 203 225 303 313 317 325 339 357 375 377 379 385 391 E20 M204 M221 M223 M224 M370 M389 M433 M441 M476 M521 N10 N14 Peak-time 3（高峰3） Peak-time 14（高峰14） Peak-time 15（高峰15） Peak-time 71（高峰71） Peak-time 95（高峰95） Sightseeing 4（观光4）	2.04	7.10	Futian
Convention and Exhibition Center	会展中心	4	3 9 34 38 60 62 63 64 80 325 371 373 379 398 E25 K113 K318 K578 M221 M223 M224 M347 M390 M441 M454 M459 M500 M521 N9 N10 Peak-express 26（高快26） Peak-time 14（高峰14） Peak-time 17（高峰17） Peak-time 71（高峰71） Peak-time 95（高峰95） Sightseeing 4（观光4）	0.72	7.82	Futian
Shopping Park	购物公园	3	3 9 64 71 235 325 327 371 373 374 379 398 B709 E1 E20 E25 K318 K359 M221 M223 M224 M441 M454 M459 Peak-time 14（高峰14） Peak-time 17（高峰17） Peak-time 95（高峰95） Sightseeing 4（观光4）	0.66	8.48	Futian
Xiangmihu	香蜜湖		21 65 79 101 113 123 213 215 222 223 234 320 324 326 365 373 383 K318 M372 M391 M392 M414 M447 M448 M488 N4 N4区间 N6 Peak-time 15（高峰15） Peak-time 18（高峰18） Peak-time 62（高峰62）	1.75	10.23	Futian
Chegongmiao	车公庙	7 9 11	21 26 28 32 65 79 101 113 123 202 204 209 213 215 222 223 234 303 324 326 327 328 338 365 372 383 395 K318 M372 M391 M392 M413 M414 M435 M447 M448 M488 M500 M521 N4 N4区间 N6 Airport 9（机场9） Peak-express 13（高快13） Peak-time 15（高峰15） Peak-time 18（高峰18） Peak-time 49（高峰49） Peak-time 62（高峰62） Peak-time 119（高峰119） Peak-time 123（高峰123） Sightseeing 1（观光1）	1.41	11.64	Futian
Zhuzilin	竹子林		21 26 28 49 64 70 101 113 123 202 204 209 213 222 223 234 303 317 320 322 327 338 365 372 373 377 383 B611 B697 B968 E4 E6 E10 E26 H92 K359 K384 K578 M372 M391 M392 M413 M414 M433 M435 M447 M448 M488 M520 M521 N4 N4区间 N6 Peak-express 16（高快16） Peak-time 15（高峰15） Peak-time 18（高峰18） Peak-time 58（高峰58） Peak-time 62（高峰62） Peak-time 70（高峰70） Peak-time 119（高峰119） Sightseeing 1（观光1） Seaside-leisure Line	1.28	12.92	Futian
Qiaocheng East	侨城东		21 26 32 45 79 123 338 369 B706 B968 M391 M398 M487 M488	1.72	14.64	Futian
Overseas Chinese Town	华侨城		21 26 32 79 101 123 204 209 222 223 234 323 324 328 365 369 373 383 390 M398 M433 M435 M487 M488 N4 N6	1.26	15.90	Nanshan
Window of the World	世界之窗	2	21 26 32 42 43 66 70 79 90 101 113 123 204 209 222 223 234 323 324 327 338 365 369 373 383 390 392 392区间 395 B795 E10 K578 M222 M372 M388 M398 M413 M425 M433 M435 M448 M486 M487 M488 N4 N4区间 N6 N24 Peak-time 8（高峰8） Peak-time 12（高峰12） Peak-time 74（高峰74） Peak-time 93（高峰93） Peak-time 134（高峰134） Sightseeing 1（观光1） Sightseeing 4（观光4）	1.17	17.07	Nanshan
Baishizhou	白石洲		21 26 42 43 45 58 66 70 79 90 101 113 123 204 209 223 234 320 323 324 327 328 338 369 383 392 B683 B795 B911 K578 M222 M372 M388 M398 M413 M435 M448 M486 M487 M488 M511 N4 N4区间 N24 Peak-time 12（高峰12） Peak-time 74（高峰74） Peak-time 93（高峰93） Sightseeing 1（观光1） Sightseeing 4（观光4）	0.79	17.86	Nanshan
Hi-Tech Park	高新园		19 21 42 45 70 72 79 101 113 204 209 223 234 323 324 327 338 365 369 373 383 390 395 B608 B683 K578 M222 M345 M358 M372 M388 M398 M413 M425 M433 M435 M448 M511 N4 N4区间 N8 Peak-express 7（高快7） Peak-express 22（高快22） Peak-time 8（高峰8） Peak-time 9（高峰9） Peak-time 10（高峰10） Peak-time 12（高峰12） Peak-time 30（高峰30） Peak-time 69（高峰69） Peak-time 93（高峰93） Peak-time 94（高峰94） Peak-time 121（高峰121） Peak-time 128（高峰128） Peak-time 150（高峰150） Sightseeing 1（观光1） Sightseeing 4（观光4） European City Line	1.36	19.22	Nanshan
Shenzhen University	深大	13	19 21 36 42 45 49 70 79 81 101 113 204 209 223 233 234 320 323 324 327 328 338 339 365 369 373 383 390 B607 B608 B683 B728 B839 E9 E10 E19 K578 M200 M209 M222 M243 M299 M313 M345 M355 M358 M372 M398 M413 M429 M433 M435 M448 M453 M511 N4 N4区间 N8 T2A Airport 8（机场8） Peak-express 22（高快22） Peak-time 8（高峰8） Peak-time 9（高峰9） Peak-time 11（高峰11） Peak-time 12（高峰12） Peak-time 22（高峰22） Peak-time 30（高峰30） Peak-time 69（高峰69） Peak-time 72（高峰72） Peak-time 74（高峰74） Peak-time 75（高峰75） Peak-time 94（高峰94） Peak-time 122（高峰122） Peak-time 128（高峰128） Peak-time 138（高峰138） Peak-time 150（高峰150） Sightseeing 1（观光1） Sightseeing 4（观光4） European City Line	1.21	20.43	Nanshan
Taoyuan	桃园	12	36 58 74 79 122 204 223 226 331 332 337 369 382 B682 B796 M206 M222 M241 M242 M343 M349 M371 M372 M453 M492 N4 N4区间 Peak-time 122（高峰122） European City Line	2.05	22.48	Nanshan
Daxin	大新	OSQ	36 42 58 201 223 B682 B796 M343 M349 M364 M370 M375 M463 M483 M484 M492 M507 M518 Peak-time 122（高峰122）	1.00	23.48	Nanshan
Liyumen	鲤鱼门		B796 M343 M349 Q-H 3（前海行3） Q-H 3区间（前海行3区间）	1.17	24.65	Nanshan
Qianhaiwan	前海湾	5 11	Q-H 2（前海行2）	0.90	25.55	Nanshan
Xin'an	新安		718 B630 B828 B973 M235 M379	1.25	26.80	Bao'an
Bao'an Center	宝安中心	5	B630 B826 B973 M350 M375 M376 M377 M470 M473	1.06	27.86	Bao'an
Bao'an Stadium	宝体		707 B828 M250 M330 M350 M375 M377 M470 M473 Peak-time 122（高峰122）	0.88	28.74	Bao'an
Pingzhou	坪洲		320 613 630 631 B631 B847 M210 M330 M350 M377 M382 M470 M507 M522 Peak-express 21（高快21） Peak-express 22（高快22） Peak-time 67（高峰67） Peak-time 146（高峰146）	1.45	30.19	Bao'an
Xixiang	西乡		613 718 B847 B914 M377 M400 M470 Peak-express 21（高快21） Peak-express 22（高快22）	1.10	31.29	Bao'an
Gushu	固戍		338 615 B778 B874 B887 B888 M245 M247 M259 M393 M433 M473 M522 T2A Airport 10（机场10） Peak-express 21（高快21） Peak-time 26（高峰26） Peak-time 30（高峰30） Peak-time 82（高峰82）	3.30	34.59	Bao'an
Hourui	后瑞		338 615 B804 B827 B905 M249 M416 M419 M433 Peak-time 30（高峰30）	3.35	37.94	Bao'an
Airport East	机场东	12	327 727 B875 B929 M237 M291 M331 M332 M334 M351 M387 M387区间 M472 Peak-time 30（高峰30）	2.49	40.43	Bao'an

== Line 2 & Line 8 ==
Service routes		Station name		Connections	Nearby bus stops	Distance km		Location
Service routes		English	Chinese	Connections	Nearby bus stops	Distance km		Location
●		Chiwan	赤湾	5	79 80 B945 M489 N4 N8	0.00	0.00	Nanshan
●		Shekou Port	蛇口港		22 70 79 80 113 122 204 226 233 328 331 332 K105 K113 K204 M371 M400 M409 M430 M448 N4 N8	1.85	1.85	Nanshan
●		Sea World	海上世界	12	37 122 204 226 233 328 331 332 B816 K105 K113 K204 M371 M400 M409 M430 M448 M493 M519 N4 N4区间 Airport 10（机场10） Q-H 8（前海行8）	1.10	2.95	Nanshan
●		Shuiwan	水湾		204 226 233 331 K105 K204 M241 M371 M400 M430 M519 N4 N4区间 Q-H 8（前海行8）	0.62	3.57	Nanshan
●		Dongjiaotou	东角头		22 37 72 79 80 B737 M241 M519 N8 Peak-time 7（高峰7） Seaside Leisure Line	1.20	4.77	Nanshan
●	●	Wanxia	湾厦		M493	1.55	6.32	Nanshan
●	●	Haiyue	海月		B737 B817 M418 M430	0.75	7.07	Nanshan
●	●	Dengliang	登良		M474	1.02	8.09	Nanshan
●	●	Houhai	后海	11 13	229 B964 M299 M429 M467 M474 M483 M493 M519 N24 Peak-time 10（高峰10）	0.95	9.04	Nanshan
●	●	Keyuan	科苑	13	72 B682 B964 E19 M299 M429 M474 Peak-time 10（高峰10） Peak-time 92（高峰92） Peak-time 94（高峰94） Peak-time 120（高峰120） Peak-time 121（高峰121） Peak-time 122（高峰122） Peak-time 138（高峰138）	1.35	10.39	Nanshan
●	●	Hongshuwan	红树湾		58 B795 B911 M313 M355 M486 M487 Peak-time 30（高峰30） Peak-time 135（高峰135）	2.25	12.64	Nanshan
●	●	Window of the World	世界之窗	1	21 26 32 42 43 66 70 79 90 101 113 123 204 209 222 223 234 323 324 327 338 365 369 373 383 390 392 392区间 395 B795 E10 K578 M222 M372 M388 M398 M413 M425 M433 M435 M448 M486 M487 M488 N4 N4区间 N6 N24 Peak-time 8（高峰8） Peak-time 12（高峰12） Peak-time 74（高峰74） Peak-time 93（高峰93） Peak-time 134（高峰134） Sightseeing 1（观光1） Sightseeing 4（观光4）	1.80	14.44	Nanshan
●	●	Qiaocheng North	侨城北		72 104 237 325 326 390 B706 B729 M486 Peak-time 62（高峰62） Peak-time 119（高峰119）	2.25	16.69	Nanshan
●	●	Shenkang	深康		70 72 M500 N24	1.20	17.89	Futian
●	●	Antuo Hill	安托山	7	374	0.80	18.69	Futian
●	●	Qiaoxiang	侨香		45 73 104 323 325 B611 B729 B968 M222 M312 M398 Peak-time 12（高峰12）	0.88	19.57	Futian
●	●	Xiangmi	香蜜		45 73 104 316 323 325 B689 M312 M369 M398 Peak-time 38（高峰38）	1.05	20.62	Futian
●	●	Xiangmei North	香梅北		38 41 45 73 104 316 323 325 B689 E12 M312 M369 M398 M441 Peak-time 38（高峰38）	1.00	21.62	Futian
●	●	Jingtian	景田	9	11 21 38 41 45 73 79 104 213 222 316 323 328 365 B613 E12 M369 M391 M392 N6	1.00	22.62	Futian
●	●	Lianhua West	莲花西		14 38 41 46 60 65 71 73 107 108 111 215 235 236 237 322 324 325 374 383 B613 K105 K359 M372 M390 M488 M499 N9 Peak-time 19（高峰19） Peak-time 38（高峰38） Peak-time 123（高峰123）	1.37	23.99	Futian
●	●	Futian	福田	3 11 GSH NZQ	9 32 38 60 71 101 107 113 123 204 223 234 235 236 320 326 327 330/Airport 1（机场1） 374 395 398 B613 B709 E18 E28 K204 K318 K578 M221 M262 M363 M390 M413 M414 M435 M447 M448 N3 N4 N4区间 N9 Peak-express 18（高快18） Peak-express 20（高快20） Peak-time 15（高峰15） Peak-time 18（高峰18） Peak-time 38（高峰38） Peak-time 49（高峰49） Peak-time 58（高峰58） Peak-time 62（高峰62） Peak-time 119（高峰119） Peak-time 134（高峰134） Sightseeing 1（观光1）	0.95	24.94	Futian
●	●	Civic Center	市民中心	4	34 38 60 64 326 371 373 398 E28 M347 M390 M435 M454 M459 M500 N3 N9 Peak-express 18（高快18） Peak-express 26（高快26） Peak-time 17（高峰17）	0.88	25.82	Futian
●	●	Gangxia North	岗厦北	10 11 14	4 101 103 113 202 203 204 223 303 320 326 395 K113 K204 M363 M414 M435 M447 M448 N4 Peak-express 20（高快20） Peak-time 38（高峰38） Peak-time 49（高峰49） Peak-time 119（高峰119）	0.75	26.57	Futian
●	●	Huaqiang North	华强北	7; 1 (via Huaqiang Road) (Note: Out-of-station virtual transfer to Line 1 at Huaqiang Road. This transfer will be counted as two separate journeys requiring two fares.)	65 67 75 80 302区间 M202 M389 M476 Peak-time 119（高峰119）	1.75	28.32	Futian
●	●	Yannan	燕南		65 80 M389 M476	0.75	29.07	Futian
●	●	Grand Theater	大剧院	1 5; 9 11 (via Hongling South) (Note: Out-of-station virtual transfer to Line 9 at Hongling South. This transfer will be counted as two separate journeys requiring two fares.)	3 10 12 29 85 101 103 104 113 203 204 214 215 223 302 E8 K113 K204 M481 N3 N4 Sightseeing 1（观光1） Sightseeing 2（观光2）	1.60	30.67	Luohu
●	●	Hubei	湖贝	5 (OSI)	2 10 17 29 85 104 205 214 220 223 K113 M290 M373 M383 N21 Peak-time 73（高峰73） Sightseeing 1（观光1）	1.85	32.52	Luohu
●	●	Huangbeiling	黄贝岭	5	10 27 69 85 111 205 220 223 336 363 381 382 387 E26 K113 M290 M348 M383 M445 M511 N14 N18 N21 Dameisha-holiday 1（大梅沙假日1） Peak-time 32（高峰32） Peak-time 58（高峰58） Peak-time 97（高峰97）Sightseeing 1（观光1）	1.20	33.72	Luohu
●	●	Xinxiu	新秀		85 111 B621 M133	1.35	35.07	Luohu
●	●	Liantang Checkpoint	莲塘口岸		27 57 69 85 111 113 218 220 308 381 B621 E11 E26 M102 M103 M133 M182 M199 M205 M207 M348 M364 M383 M437 M468 M526 M555 Peak-time 33（高峰33）	1.1	36.17	Luohu
●	●	Xianhu Road	仙湖路		27 57 113 220 B621 M102 M468	1.9	38.07	Luohu
●	●	Liantang	莲塘	8 (Note: Line 2 connects with Line 8 at Liantang station, trains on Line 2 continue their service to Yantian Road station.)	27 57 113 381 B621 B625 M207 M468	0.9	38.97	Luohu
●		Wutong Mountain South	梧桐山南		27 57 69 85 111 113 308 M103 M133 M191 M199 M205 M207 M364 M437 M468 M520 M555	1.7	40.67	Luohu
●		Shatoujiao	沙头角		68 85 308 B619 M199 M205 M437 M520	4.2	44.87	Yantian
●		Haishan	海山		68 85 308 358 308-Fast（358快线）E26 M191 M196 M199 M205 M288 M362 M437 M444 M520	1.5	46.37	Yantian
●		Yantian Port West	盐田港西		68 308 358 308-Fast（358快线）E26 M191 M196 M199 M205 M288 M362 M437 M444 M520	1.2	47.57	Yantian
●		Shenwai Senior Campus	深外高中		B925 C4 M348 M444 M465	2.9	50.47	Yantian
●		Yantian Road	盐田路		68 85 358 B676 B925 B927 M205 M205X（M205大站快车）M348 M380 M444 Dameisha-holiday-express-1（大梅沙假日专线1）	1.3	51.77	Yantian
●		Hong'anwei	洪安围			1.1	52.87	Yantian
●		Yantianxu	盐田墟			1.1	53.97	Yantian
●		Dameisha	大梅沙			3.6	57.57	Yantian
●		Xiaomeisha	小梅沙			2.1	59.67	Yantian
		Xichong	溪涌					Dapeng New District

== Line 3 ==
Service routes				Station name		Connections	Nearby bus stops	Distance km		Location
Service routes				English	Chinese	Connections	Nearby bus stops	Distance km		Location
●	↓			Futian Bonded Area	福保		26 52 60 62 385 B618 B962 M120 M476	0.00	0.00	Futian
●	↓			Yitian	益田		4 26 71 80 103 317 339 362 375 377 B685 B820 M347 M362 M433 M453 M500 M511	1.50	1.50	Futian
●	↓			Shixia	石厦	7	28 34 73 202 303 372 B689 B957 K113 M370 M389 M390	0.95	2.45	Futian
●	↓			Shopping Park	购物公园	1	3 9 64 71 235 325 327 371 373 374 379 398 B709 E1 E20 E25 K318 K359 M221 M223 M224 M441 M454 M459 Peak-time 14（高峰14） Peak-time 17（高峰17） Peak-time 95（高峰95） Sightseeing 4（观光4）	1.20	3.65	Futian
●	↓			Futian	福田	2 8 11 GSH NZQ	9 32 38 60 71 101 107 113 123 204 223 234 235 236 320 326 327 330/Airport 1（机场1） 374 395 398 B613 B709 E18 E28 K204 K318 K578 M221 M262 M363 M390 M413 M414 M435 M447 M448 N3 N4 N4区间 N9 Peak-express 18（高快18） Peak-express 20（高快20） Peak-time 15（高峰15） Peak-time 18（高峰18） Peak-time 38（高峰38） Peak-time 49（高峰49） Peak-time 58（高峰58） Peak-time 62（高峰62） Peak-time 119（高峰119） Peak-time 134（高峰134） Sightseeing 1（观光1）	0.65	4.30	Futian
●	↓			Children's Palace	少年宫	4	10 34 41 46 64 65 108 111 215 383 M262 M372 M459 M488 Peak-time 123（高峰123）	1.50	5.80	Futian
●	↓			Lianhuacun	莲花村	10	10 14 34 46 64 65 67 75 104 108 111 123 215 237 313 322 333 339 357 371 379 383 398 E28 K105 M204 M221 M223 M262 M347 M372 M374 M383 M389 M454 M459 M488 M500 M521 Peak-express 18（高快18） Peak-time 15（高峰15） Peak-time 21（高峰21） Peak-time 106（高峰106） Peak-time 123（高峰123）	0.75	6.55	Futian
●	↓	↑	●	Huaxin	华新	7	9 10 13 41 64 67 108 123 225 236 302区间 303 383 385 B622 K105 M202 M460 N6 Peak-express 4（高快4） Peak-time 119（高峰119）	1.95	8.50	Futian
●	↓	↑	●	Tongxinling	通新岭	6	4 8 9 10 12 13 64 65 80 108 123 202 207 225 303 375 383 393 B622 K105 M370 M389 M476 M481 N6 N17	1.00	9.50	Futian
●	↓	↑	●	Hongling	红岭	9	7 10 23 63 64 85 108 207 225 352 383 393 E8 E25 M360 M401 M463 N6 N10	0.75	10.25	Futian
●	↓	↑	●	Laojie	老街	1 17	3 10 12 14 29 59 64 85 103 104 113 203 204 211 214 215 223 302 309 336 337 351 E8 K113 M399 M402 M481 M482 N3 N4 N6 N14 Sightseeing 1（观光1） Sightseeing 2（观光2）	1.50	11.75	Luohu
●	↓	↑	●	Shaibu	晒布		1 3 5 11 59 64 69 82 102 103 113 203 211 306 307 309 351 369 B909 H92 M399 M402 M403 M404 M407 M408 M481 M482 M508 M509 N3 N6 N7 N16 N19 Peak-express 20（高快20） Sightseeing 2（观光2）	1.00	12.75	Luohu
●	↓	↑	●	Cuizhu	翠竹		2 3 13 57 59 62 64 65 83 103 107 113 202 203 211 218 242 306 333 351 E11 E11区间 E12 H92 M348 M399 M407 M481 M482 M508 N2 N3 N6 U1 Airport 6（机场6） Peak-time 97（高峰97）	1.10	13.85	Luohu
●	↓	↑	●	Tianbei	田贝	7	1 2 57 59 62 63 83 107 203 209 242 320 333 371 376 379 977 M406 M482 N2 N6 N7 N10	1.50	15.35	Luohu
●	↓	↑	●	Shuibei	水贝		23 225 B840	1.10	16.45	Luohu
●	↓	↑	●	Caopu	草埔		2 18 27 201 213 222 303 307 308 309 312 321 322 323 357 366 369 371 373 374 375 376 377 383 398 836 956 977 B698 E24 M203 M224 M240 M267 M269 M283 M358 M402 M403 M404 M406 M408 M414 M421 M476 M485 M511 N6 N17 N19 Peak-time 11（高峰11） Peak-time 18（高峰18） Peak-time 19（高峰19） Peak-time 32（高峰32） Shen-Hui 3A（深惠3A） Sightseeing 2（观光2）	1.60	18.05	Luohu
●	↓	↑	●	Buji	布吉	5 14 BJQ GS	8 85 309 321 322 323 357 366 371 372 375 376 379 383 398 839 954 977 980 E24 M203 M224 M233 M244 M265 M268 M271 M273 M283 M295 M310 M311 M358 M378 M379 M404 M406 M408 M415 M485 M511 Peak-time 79（高峰79） Peak-time 124（高峰124） Shen-Hui 3A（深惠3A） Sightseeing 2（观光2） Wutong-Hill 2（梧桐山2）	2.15	20.20	Longgang
●	↓	↑	●	Mumianwan	木棉湾		8 58 306 309 321 322 323 357 366 371 372 373 374 375 376 379 383 398 822 836 839 954 977 B695 M203 M224 M233 M265 M268 M271 M272 M273 M281 M283 M295 M310 M358 M378 M379 M403 M404 M406 M408 M476 M485 M508 Peak-time 17（高峰17） Peak-time 19（高峰19） Peak-time 32（高峰32） Shen-Hui 3A（深惠3A） Wutong-Hill 2（梧桐山2）	1.10	21.30	Longgang
●	↓	↑	●	Dafen	大芬		8 309 322 323 357 366 372 373 374 380B 398 812 839 977 B695 B810 K359 M227 M233 M268 M273 M283 M295 M300 M358 M363 M378 M395 M485 M508 M511 Peak-express 20（高快20） Peak-time 17（高峰17） Peak-time 19（高峰19） Peak-time 124（高峰124） Shen-Hui 3A（深惠3A）	1.15	22.45	Longgang
●	↓	↑	●	Danzhutou	丹竹头	17	8 9 61 309 357 366 372 379 380B 812 839 B810 B882 M227 M233 M268 M283 M295 M324 M358 M378 M485 M491 M498 Peak-express 20（高快20） Peak-time 89（高峰89） Shen-Hui 3A（深惠3A）	1.25	23.70	Longgang
●	↓	↑	●	Liuyue	六约		61 309 351 357 366 380B 812 M229 M266 M268 M295 M309 M324 M359 M378 Peak-express 20（高快20） Shen-Hui 3（深惠3） Shen-Hui 3A（深惠3A）	3.95	27.65	Longgang
●	↓	↑	●	Tangkeng	塘坑		309 351 357 366 380B 812 B679 B750 M266 M268 M295 M309 M359 M378 Peak-express 20（高快20） Shen-Hui 3（深惠3） Shen-Hui 3A（深惠3A）	1.35	29.00	Longgang
●		↑		Henggang	横岗		309 351 358 366 380A 812 B750 M266 M268 M295 M309 M359 M378 Peak-express 15（高快15） Peak-time 64（高峰64） Shen-Hui 3（深惠3） Shen-Hui 3A（深惠3A）	2.00	31.00	Longgang
●		↑		Yonghu	永湖		309 351 358 366 380A 812 906 B679 M266 M268 M295 M314 M357 M359 M394 M466 Peak-time 64（高峰64） Shen-Hui 3（深惠3） Shen-Hui 3A（深惠3A）	1.50	32.50	Longgang
●		↑		He'ao	荷坳		309 351 358 366 380A 812 833 M229 M266 M268 M294 M314 M357 M359 M368 M386 M394 M466 Dapeng-holiday 1（大鹏假日1） Shen-Hui 3A（深惠3A）	1.70	34.20	Longgang
●		↑		Universiade	大运	14 16	309 330B 351 358 366 380A 812 833 868 868区间1 923 B852 E21 E23 M229 M266 M268 M294 M303 M314 M316 M317 M318 M322 M357 M359 M367 M368 M386 M446 M466 T1 T2A Dapeng-holiday 1（大鹏假日1） Shen-Hui 3A（深惠3A）	1.45	35.65	Longgang
●		↑		Ailian	爱联		309 330B 358 366 380A 811 812 833 868 868区间1 E23 M266 M268 M278 M319 M320 M322 M359 T1 T2A Dapeng-holiday 1（大鹏假日1） Shen-Hui 3A（深惠3A）	1.50	37.15	Longgang
●		↑		Jixiang	吉祥		309 330B 358 366 380A 811 812 833 868 868区间1 M266 M268 M275 M278 M319 M320 M359 M367 M502 T1 T2A Dapeng-holiday 1（大鹏假日1） Shen-Hui 2支（深惠2支） Shen-Hui 3A（深惠3A）	1.70	38.85	Longgang
●		↑		Longcheng Square	龙城广场		309 351 365 366 380A 811 812 818 818大站快 839 862 868 868区间1 929 B723 B751 E6 E7 E21 E23 E25 E27 M220 M230 M266 M268 M275 M303 M306 M315 M359 M361 M367 M431 M447 M502 T1 Dapeng-holiday 1（大鹏假日1） Dapeng-holiday 12（大鹏假日12） Shen-Hui 3A（深惠3A）	1.35	40.20	Longgang
●		↑		Nanlian	南联		309 351 365 366 380A 811 812 818 818大站快 839 868 868区间1 B669 E6 E27 M220 M266 M268 M275 M303 M305 M308 M315 M317 M359 M361 M394 M431 M447 M452 T1 Dapeng-holiday 1（大鹏假日1） Shen-Hui 1（深惠1） Shen-Hui 3A（深惠3A）	1.25	41.45	Longgang
●		↑		Shuanglong	双龙	16	309 351 365 366 380A 810 811 812 818 818大站快 839 862 862区间 868 868区间1 B669 E6 E7 E21 E23 E25 M230 M266 M268 M275 M276 M277 M278 M280 M304 M305 M307 M308 M316 M359 M361 M386 M431 M447 M497 T1 Dapeng-holiday 1（大鹏假日1） Dapeng-holiday 12（大鹏假日12） Shen-Hui 1（深惠1） Shen-Hui 2（深惠2） Shen-Hui 2支（深惠2支） Shen-Hui 3A（深惠3A）	1.45	42.90	Longgang
●				Liyuan	梨园					Longgang
●				Xinsheng	新生	21				Longgang
●				Pingxi	坪西					Longgang
●				Low Carbon City	低碳城					Longgang
●				Baishitang	白石塘					Longgang
●				Fuping	富坪					Longgang
●				Pingdi Liulian	坪地六联					Longgang

== Line 4 ==
Service routes		Station name		Connections	Nearby bus stops	Distance km		Location
Service routes		English	Chinese	Connections	Nearby bus stops	Distance km		Location
●	●	Futian Checkpoint	福田口岸	10 (out of station) (Note: Out-of-station interchange.); East Rail line (Note: System transfer via Lok Ma Chau [through border check].)	26 52 62 203 B618 B685 B689 B858 M204 M441 M453 M499	0.00	0.00	Futian
●	●	Fumin	福民	7 10	4 26 28 52 60 62 73 103 202 203 225 235 303 339 362 372 377 385 B689 B858 M204 M362 M370 M389 M441 M476 N9 Peak-time 21（高峰21）	1.10	1.10	Futian
●	●	Convention and Exhibition Center	会展中心	1	3 34 38 60 64 325 371 373 379 398 E25 M221 M223 M224 M347 M390 M441 M454 M459 M500 N9 Peak-time 17（高峰17） Peak-time 95（高峰95） Sightseeing 4（观光4）	1.35	2.45	Futian
●	●	Civic Center	市民中心	2	34 38 60 64 311 326 371 373 398 E28 M347 M390 M435 M454 M459 M500 N9 Peak-time 17（高峰17）	0.80	3.25	Futian
●	●	Children's Palace	少年宫	3	10 41 46 54 65 108 111 215 383 M262 M372 Peak-time 123（高峰123）	0.70	3.95	Futian
●	●	Lianhua North	莲花北		11 12 14 46 58 59 71 79 104 209 213 316 323 365 M369 M391 M392 N6 N14 Sightseeing 2（观光2）	1.30	5.25	Futian
●	●	Shangmeilin	上梅林	9	44 45 60 102 201 216 218 222 242 324 334 374 B821 M204 M312 M460 N9 N12 Peak-time 19（高峰19）	1.20	6.45	Futian
●	●	Minle station	民乐	6 (via Meilinguan)	7 34 60 75 81 234 302 302区间 313 316 317 317区间 324 328 333 334 336 339 352 390 391 393 620 812 B653 B656 B657 B666 M201 M202 M222 M263 M271 M281 M282 M302 M342 M344 M346 M360 M363 M372 M374 M383 M391 M392 M398 M401 M405 M437 M447 M448 M481 M500 N9 U1 Dameisha-holiday 2（大梅沙假日2） Peak-time 3（高峰3） Peak-time 12（高峰12） Peak-time 13（高峰13） Peak-time 91（高峰91） Peak-time 92（高峰92） Peak-time 106（高峰106） Peak-time 123（高峰123） Sightseeing 3（观光3）	2.95	9.40	Longhua
●	●	Baishilong	白石龙		B653 B655 B657 B877 E3 M262 M342 M365 M385 Peak-time 91（高峰91）	1.05	10.45	Longhua
●	●	Shenzhen North	深圳北站	5 6 XS GSH IOQ	B666 B667 B730 B742 E7 E11 E22 E28 E30 M217 M225 M299 M300 M340 M341 M343 M344 M347 M352 M353 M354 M365 M369 M462 M477 U1 Peak-time 76（高峰76） Peak-time 120（高峰120）	1.60	12.05	Longhua
●	●	Hongshan	红山	6	No bus stop nearby	1.45	13.50	Longhua
●	●	Shangtang	上塘		612 B690 B830 B831 B915 M223 M420 M500 Peak-time 38（高峰38） Peak-time 150（高峰150）	2.00	15.50	Longhua
●	●	Longsheng	龙胜		612 B648 B690 B692 B715 B830 B879 M214 M264 Peak-time 15（高峰15） Peak-time 38（高峰38） Peak-time 70（高峰70） Peak-time 91（高峰91）	1.05	16.55	Longhua
●	●	Longhua	龙华		336 390 B648 B692 E1 M214 M269 M372 Peak-time 70（高峰70） Peak-time 92（高峰92）	1.30	17.85	Longhua
●	●	Qinghu	清湖	Longhua Tram	B731 B916 B920 M212 M264 M287 M302 M337 M338 M339 M401 M450 M464 M503 M504 Peak-time 51（高峰51） Peak-time 54（高峰54） Peak-time 80（高峰80） Peak-time 81（高峰81） Shen-Guan 1（深莞1）	2.10	19.95	Longhua
●	●	Qinghu North	清湖北			0.95	20.90	Longhua
●	●	Zhucun	竹村			1.70	22.60	Longhua
●	●	Xikeng	茜坑			1.20	23.80	Longhua
●		Changhu	长湖	18		1.50	25.30	Longhua
●		Guanlan	观澜	Longhua Tram		1.30	26.60	Longhua
●		Songyuanxia	松元厦	22		1.30	27.90	Longhua
●		Mission Hills	观澜湖			1.20	29.10	Longhua
●		Niuhu	牛湖			1.40	30.50	Longhua

== Line 5 ==
Service routes		Station name		Connections	Nearby bus stops	Distance km		Location
Service routes		English	Chinese	Connections	Nearby bus stops	Distance km		Location
●		Chiwan	赤湾	2				Nanshan
●		Liwan	荔湾					Nanshan
●		Railway Park	铁路公园					Nanshan
●		Mawan	妈湾					Nanshan
●		Qianwan Park	前湾公园					Nanshan
●		Qianwan	前湾	9				Nanshan
●		Guiwan	桂湾					Nanshan
●	●	Qianhaiwan	前海湾	1 11		0.00	0.00	Nanshan
●	●	Linhai	临海		B828	1.40	1.40	Bao'an
●	●	Baohua	宝华		B828 M235	0.90	2.30	Bao'an
●	●	Bao'an Center	宝安中心	1	M375 M376 M377 M473	0.60	2.90	Bao'an
●	●	Fanshen	翻身		631 794 797 B623 E15 M375 M376 M377 M483 T2A Peak-time 26（高峰26）	0.85	3.75	Bao'an
●	●	Lingzhi	灵芝	12	382 395 606 610 615 630 651 797 866 E23 M250 M349 M370 M371 M378 M380 M425	1.50	5.25	Bao'an
●	●	Honglang North	洪浪北	15	382 610 613 629 630 651 866 B829 M206 M245 M246 M313 M376 M377 M378 M379 M381 M382 M385 M393	0.90	6.15	Bao'an
●	●	Xingdong	兴东		382 613 630 631 651 797 866 B889 M206 M376 M377 M378 M379 M382 M385 M393 Peak-time 103（高峰103）	1.15	7.30	Bao'an
●	●	Liuxiandong	留仙洞	13	37 54 235 382 797 B708 B796 B855 M393 M429 Peak-time 93（高峰93） Peak-time 103（高峰103）	2.65	9.95	Nanshan
●	●	Xili	西丽	7	19 36 54 66 67 74 81 101 104 122 226 233 235 237 316 325 325B 326 332 382 392 392区间 797 B604 B708 B796 B797 E19 M203 M243 M299 M343 M345 M369 M385 M393 M429 M459 M492 N8 Peak-time 75（高峰75） Peak-time 93（高峰93） Peak-time 94（高峰94） Peak-time 104（高峰104）	1.00	10.95	Nanshan
●	●	University Town	大学城		36 43 49 74 81 122 B736 M217 M299 M343 M369 M385 M393 M459 Peak-time 94（高峰94）	1.30	12.25	Nanshan
●	●	Tanglang	塘朗		B818 M217 M343 M393 M460 Peak-time 94（高峰94） Peak-time 119（高峰119） Peak-time 120（高峰120）	3.60	15.85	Nanshan
●	●	Changlingpi	长岭陂		43 74 81 M217 M299 M343 M369 M385 M393 M459 M460 Peak-time 94（高峰94） Peak-time 119（高峰119）	1.55	17.4	Nanshan
●	●	Shenzhen North	深圳北站	4 6 XS GSH IOQ	B666 B667 B730 B742 E7 E11 E22 M217 M225 M299 M300 M340 M341 M343 M344 M347 M352 M353 M354 M365 M462 M477 U1 Peak-time 76（高峰76） Peak-time 120（高峰120）	2.50	19.90	Longhua
●	●	Minzhi	民治		302 302区间 324 333 334 336 339 352 620 621 B657 B690 B917 E7 M225 M262 M282 M302 M344 M365 M372 M391 M392 M500 Peak-express 9（高快9） Peak-time 7（高峰7） Peak-time 13（高峰13） Peak-time 24（高峰24） Sightseeing 3（观光3）	1.30	21.20	Longhua
●	●	Wuhe	五和	10	313 317 317区间 391 612 812 B653 B666 B667 M263 M271 M281 M282 M346 M374 M383 M415 M447 M461 M491 Peak-time 71（高峰71）	2.30	23.50	Longgang
●	●	Bantian	坂田		312 321 333 651 839 982 B668 B742 B923 E7 E8 E22 E27 M221 M233 M300 M301 M363 M374 M379 M385 M415 M447 M448 M481 M505 Peak-time 39（高峰39）	1.05	24.55	Longgang
●	●	Yangmei	杨美		321 651 839 B742 M233 M301 M363 M379 M385 M415 M461	0.95	25.50	Longgang
●	●	Shangshuijing	上水径		123 303 307 308 312 381 839 980 B695 K105 M233 M267 M268 M269 M271 M272 M378 M379 M414 M415 M421 N19 Peak-time 25（高峰25） Peak-time 79（高峰79）	2.65	28.15	Longgang
●	●	Xiashuijing	下水径		123 303 307 308 312 381 839 980 B695 K105 M233 M267 M268 M269 M271 M272 M378 M379 M414 M415 M421 N19 Peak-time 25（高峰25） Peak-time 79（高峰79）	1.10	29.25	Longgang
●	●	Changlong	长龙		9 61 303 306 307 308 312 369 821B 839 956 980 B695 K545 M233 M265 M267 M268 M269 M271 M272 M378 M379 M402 M414 M415 M421 N19 Peak-time 79（高峰79）	0.80	30.05	Longgang
●	●	Buji	布吉	3 14 BJQ GS	8 85 309 321 322 357 366 371 372 375 376 383 398 839 954 977 980 E24 M203 M224 M233 M244 M265 M268 M271 M273 M283 M295 M310 M311 M358 M378 M379 M404 M406 M408 M415 M485 Peak-time 79（高峰79） Sightseeing 2（观光2） Shen-Hui 3A（深惠3A） Wutong-Hill 2（梧桐山2）	1.10	31.15	Longgang
●	●	Baigelong	百鸽笼		80 82 822 M281	1.15	32.30	Longgang
●	●	Buxin	布心		29 59 64 83 107 372 379 B696 N2 N3 N6	1.95	34.25	Luohu
●	●	Tai'an	太安	7	2 23 308 363 376 B840 M364 M437 Dameisha-holiday 2（大梅沙假日2）	0.90	35.15	Luohu
●	●	Yijing	怡景		13 17 52 57 65 103 104 113 202 214 218 223 229 308 333 B909 H92 M373 M437 N15 U1 Airport 6（机场6）	2.05	37.2	Luohu
●	●	Huangbeiling	黄贝岭	2	10 27 69 85 111 205 220 223 311 336 363 381 382 387 E26 K113 M290 M348 M362 M383 M445 N14 N21 Dameisha-holiday 2（大梅沙假日2） Peak-time 32（高峰32） Peak-time 97（高峰97）Sightseeing 1（观光1）	1.55	38.75	Luohu
		Hubei	湖贝	2 (OSI)				Luohu
		Dongmen	东门					Luohu
		Grand Theater	大剧院	1 2; 9 11 (via Hongling South)				Luohu

== Line 6 ==
- M - main line services (Before 11:00 PM)
- S1 - Short line services 1 (From 11:00 PM to 11:30 PM)
- S2 - Short line services 2 (From 11:00 PM to 11:30 PM)

M	S1	S2	Station name		Connections	Nearby bus stops	Distance km	Location
M	S1	S2	English	Chinese	Connections	Nearby bus stops	Distance km	Location
●		●	Songgang	松岗	11 12			Bao'an
●		●	Xitou	溪头				Bao'an
●		●	Songgang Park	松岗公园				Bao'an
●		●	Shutianpu	薯田埔				Guangming
●		●	Heshuikou	合水口				Guangming
●		●	Gongming Square	公明广场	13			Guangming
●		●	Honghuashan	红花山				Guangming
●		●	Loucun	楼村				Guangming
●		●	Science Park	科学公园				Guangming
●		●	Guangming	光明	6B			Guangming
●		●	Guangming Street	光明大街				Guangming
●	●	●	Fenghuang Town	凤凰城	13			Guangming
●	●		Changzhen	长圳	18			Guangming
●	●		Shangwu	上屋	13			Bao'an
●	●		Guantian	官田				Bao'an
●	●		Yangtai Mountain East	阳台山东				Longhua
●	●		Yuanfen	元芬				Longhua
●	●		Shangfen	上芬				Longhua
●	●		Hongshan	红山	4			Longhua
●	●		Shenzhen North	深圳北站	4 5 IOQ			Longhua
●	●		Meilinguan	梅林关	4 (via Minle)			Longhua
●	●		Hanling	翰岭				Futian
●	●		Yinhu	银湖	9			Luohu
●	●		Bagualing	八卦岭	7			Futian
●	●		Sports Center	体育中心				Futian
●	●		Tongxinling	通新岭	3			Futian
●	●		Science Museum	科学馆	1			Futian

== Line 6 Branch ==
Station name		Connections	Nearby bus stops	Distance km	Location
English	Chinese	Connections	Nearby bus stops	Distance km	Location
SUAT	深理工		Dongguan 747（莞747）		Guangming
Sun Yat-sen University	中大		M356 Dongguan 747（莞747）		Guangming
Zhenmei	圳美		325 B901 E3 M356 M411 M490 M596 Peak-time 149（高峰149）Dongguan 747（莞747）		Guangming
Guangming	光明	6			Guangming
Biyan	碧眼				Guangming
Hongqiao Park	虹桥公园				Guangming
Guangmingcheng	光明城	13 18 IMQ			Guangming

== Line 7 ==
Service routes		Station name		Connections	Nearby bus stops	Distance km		Location
Service routes		English	Chinese	Connections	Nearby bus stops	Distance km		Location
●		SZU Lihu Campus	深大丽湖					Nanshan
●		Peking University	北大					Nanshan
●		Xili Lake	西丽湖		36 49 66 101 104 226 B736 B796 B797 M369 M460 M492	0.00	0.00	Nanshan
●		Xili	西丽	5	19 36 54 66 67 74 81 101 104 122 226 233 235 237 316 325 325B 326 332 382 392 392区间 797 B604 B708 B796 B797 E19 M203 M243 M299 M343 M345 M369 M385 M393 M429 M459 M492 N8 Peak-time 75（高峰75） Peak-time 93（高峰93） Peak-time 94（高峰94） Peak-time 104（高峰104）	2.20	2.20	Nanshan
●		Chaguang	茶光		19 36 54 66 67 74 81 101 226 233 237 316 325 332 392 392区间 B604 B708 M203 M243 M299 M343 M345 M429 M492 N8 Peak-time 69（高峰69） Peak-time 93（高峰93） Peak-time 94（高峰94） Peak-time 104（高峰104）	0.75	2.95	Nanshan
●		Zhuguang	珠光		19 72 104 201 235 316 325 326 334 B707 M203 M369 M474 N8 Peak-time 26（高峰26） Peak-time 69（高峰69）	1.10	4.05	Nanshan
●		Longjing	龙井		19 26 58 67 72 201 235 316 325 326 334 B707 M203 M369 M474 N8 Peak-time 62（高峰62） Peak-time 69（高峰69）	1.60	5.65	Nanshan
●		Taoyuancun	桃源村		19 26 41 58 67 72 104 201 235 316 325 326 334 B706 B707 M203 M369 M474 N8 Peak-time 49（高峰49） Peak-time 62（高峰62） Peak-time 69（高峰69）	0.80	6.45	Nanshan
●	●	Shenyun	深云		41 201 235 B729 M240 M358 M364	1.30	7.75	Nanshan
●	｜	Antuo Hill	安托山	2	374 B733	1.60	9.35	Futian
●	｜	Nonglin	农林		70 73 107 108 326 328 374 B611 B697 M312 M500	1.90	11.25	Futian
●	｜	Chegongmiao	车公庙	1 9 11	21 26 28 79 101 113 121 123 202 204 209 213 222 223 234 303 324 326 338 365 372 M372 M391 M392 M413 M414 M435 M447 M448 M500 N4 N6 Peak-time 18（高峰18） Peak-time 62（高峰62） Peak-time 119（高峰119）	1.55	12.80	Futian
●	｜	Shangsha	上沙		26 28 44 71 80 103 121 202 215 303 317 322 339 362 372 374 377 B689 M347 M362 M370 M433 M453 M500 Futian-FTZ 1（福田保税区1）	1.60	14.40	Futian
●	｜	Shawei	沙尾		26 44 71 80 103 121 202 303 317 322 339 372 377 B685 B689 M347 M362 M370 M433 M453 M500	0.80	15.20	Futian
●	｜	Shixia	石厦	3	28 34 73 202 303 372 B689 K113 M370 M389 M390 Peak-time 14（高峰14）	1.40	16.60	Futian
●	｜	Huanggangcun	皇岗村		28 34 63 73 202 303 372 385 B689 B858 K113 M370 N10	0.65	17.25	Futian
●	｜	Fumin	福民	4 10	4 26 28 52 60 62 73 103 202 203 225 235 303 339 362 372 377 385 B689 B858 M204 M362 M370 M389 M441 M476 N9 Peak-time 21（高峰21）	0.60	17.85	Futian
●	｜	Huanggang Checkpoint	皇岗口岸		9 23 26 121 235 313 325 326 338 357 362 366 M433 N25 Airport 9（机场9）	1.00	18.85	Futian
｜	｜	Fulin	福邻			0.75	19.60	Futian
●	｜	Chiwei	赤尾		23 28 52 73 214 229 337 366 369 372 382 J1 M362 M463	0.80	20.40	Futian
●	｜	Huaqiang South	华强南	11	9 13 14 23 32 38 62 63 214 216 225 317 377 385 391 B622 B812 M370 M374 N10 N14 Peak-time 106（高峰106）	0.70	21.10	Futian
●	｜	Huaqiang North	华强北	2	65 67 80 302区间 M202 M389 M476	0.70	21.80	Futian
●	｜	Huaxin	华新	3	10 13 41 59 64 67 108 123 225 236 303 311 383 385 K105 N6 Peak-express 4（高快4） Peak-time 119（高峰119）	0.60	22.40	Futian
●	｜	Huangmugang	黄木岗	14	9 11 12 46 58 59 79 102 107 111 207 209 213 216 234 302 302区间 317 317区间 320 322 323 333 357 365 371 379 398 B615 B622 E2 E5 E11 E12 E20 M201 M202 M203 M369 M401 M405 M414 M460 M481 N6 N12 N25 U1 Peak-time 95（高峰95） Sightseeing 2（观光2）	0.65	23.05	Futian
●	｜	Bagualing	八卦岭	6	323 M152 M156	1.30	24.35	Futian
●	｜	Hongling North	红岭北	9	5 8 Peak-time 29（Original 9） 23 57 69 79 85 222 321 323 385 E8 E25 M105 M193 M360 M389 M463 N6 N16 N17 N25	1.00	25.35	Luohu
●	｜	Sungang	笋岗		18 57 63 69 80 225 303 322 323 333 366 371 381 323区间 366区间 M132 M482 M406 N10	0.70	26.05	Luohu
●	｜	Honghu	洪湖		1 27 80 82 213 303 307 312 320 322 323 357 363 366 369 371 377 977 M183 M192 M203 M239 M402 M403 M404 M406 M408 M414 M437 M526 M555 N7 N19 Holiday 12、Peak-time 32（高峰32） Peak-express 20 （高快20）	1.30	27.35	Luohu
●	｜	Tianbei	田贝	3	1 2 40 57 59 62 83 107 203 242 320 333 376 977 M482 N2 N6 N7	0.70	28.05	Luohu
●	｜	Tai'an	太安	5	2 23 308 363 376 B840 M364 M437 Dameisha-holiday 2（大梅沙假日2）	1.10	29.15	Luohu
	●	Wenti Park (Note: The station is staff-only. Not open to public.)	文体公园					Nanshan

== Line 9 ==
Station name		Connections	Nearby bus stops	Distance km		Location
English	Chinese	Connections	Nearby bus stops	Distance km		Location
Qianwan	前湾	5				Nanshan
Menghai	梦海					Nanshan
Yihai	怡海					Nanshan
Litchi Orchards	荔林					Nanshan
Nanyou West	南油西					Nanshan
Nanyou	南油	12				Nanshan
Nanshan Book Mall	南山书城					Nanshan
Shenzhen University South	深大南					Nanshan
Yuehaimen	粤海门	13				Nanshan
Hi-Tech South	高新南					Nanshan
Hongshuwan South	红树湾南	11		0.00	0.00	Nanshan
Shenwan	深湾			0.85	0.85	Nanshan
Shenzhen Bay Park	深圳湾公园		80 339 B706 M347 M453 M463 M486 Seaside-leisure Line	1.50	2.35	Nanshan
Xiasha	下沙		26 34 63 64 80 103 229 236 337 369 382 E4 E6 E17 E26 E37 H92 M105 M106 M133 M194 M347 M453 M463 M519 N10 Peak-express 16（高快16）Peak-time 1（高峰1） Peak-time 19（高峰19） Peak-time 58（高峰58） Peak-time 70（高峰70） Airport 2（机场2）	3.45	5.80	Futian
Chegongmiao	车公庙	1 7 11	21 26 71 79 101 113 202 204 213 222 223 234 303 324 326 338 365 M109 M123 M172 M372 M391 M392 M413 M414 M435 M447 M448 M500 M521 M559 N4 N6 Peak-time 18（高峰18） Peak-time 62（高峰62） Peak-time 119（高峰119）	1.10	6.90	Futian
Xiangmei	香梅		21 65 79 107 108 213 215 222 237 325 365 B733 M109 M183 M372 M391 M441 N6	2.00	8.90	Futian
Jingtian	景田	2	11 21 38 41 45 73 79 104 213 222 316 323 328 365 B613 E12 M369 M391 M392 N6	1.35	10.25	Futian
Meijing	梅景		11 12 21 44 58 67 102 201 216 235 334 B613 B689 B912 E18 M203 M204 M222 M240 M312 M358 M364 M390 M398 M460 N12 Peak-time 11（高峰11） Peak-time 22（高峰22） Airport 6（机场6）	0.90	11.15	Futian
Xiameilin	下梅林		44 45 60 67 201 216 222 324 334 374 B821 B912 M204 M207 M312 M460 N9 Peak-time 19（高峰19）	0.75	11.90	Futian
Meicun	梅村		44 45 60 67 201 222 324 334 374 B821 M204 M207 M312 M460 N9 Peak-time 19（高峰19）	1.25	13.15	Futian
Shangmeilin	上梅林	4	44 45 60 102 201 216 218 222 324 334 374 B821 M204 M312 M460 N9 N12 Peak-time 19（高峰19）	0.80	13.95	Futian
Maling	孖岭	10	B821	0.80	14.75	Futian
Yinhu	银湖	6	4 5 7 46 201 207 218 222 336 352 374 393 B614 E11 E24 M193 M203 M240 M358 M360 M364 M435 M437 M454 M460 Dameisha-holiday 2（大梅沙假日2） Peak-time 11（高峰11） Peak-time 13（高峰13） Peak-time 19（高峰19） Peak-time 24（高峰24） Airport 6（机场6）	2.25	17.00	Luohu
Nigang	泥岗		B614	0.90	17.90	Luohu
Hongling North	红岭北	7	5 8 9 23 57 69 79 85 222 237 303 321 323 333 336 375 385 E8 E25 M105 M123 M360 M389 M463 N16 N17 N25 Peak-express 9（高快9） Peak-time 13（高峰13）	1.15	19.05	Boundary between Luohu and Futian (Note: Stations located on Hongling Road, which is the boundary of Luohu and Futian districts, with exits in both districts.)
Yuanling	园岭		7 9 11 13 79 102 107 111 202 213 320 357 375 377 E12 M203 M329 M370 M401 M414 N25 U1 Peak-express 9（高快9） Peak-time 13（高峰13） Peak-time 25（高峰25）	0.70	19.75	Boundary between Luohu and Futian
Hongling	红岭	3	7 10 23 63 64 80 85 108 207 225 393 E8 M152 M183 M360 M401 M463 N6 N10	0.80	20.55	Boundary between Luohu and Futian
Hongling South	红岭南	11 (OSI); 1 2 5 (via Grand Theater) (Note: Out-of-station virtual transfer to Lines 1 and 2 at Grand Theater.)	7 8 14 23 29 62 63 75 214 377 395 E25 M152 M360 M383 M401 M463 M482 N10 N14	1.00	21.55	Boundary between Luohu and Futian
Ludancun	鹿丹村		8 38 229 337 366 M401	0.80	22.35	Luohu
Renmin South	人民南	1 (via Luohu) (Note: Out-of-station virtual transfer to Line 1 at Luohu.)	1 7 17 38 82 83 97 102 205 306 337 387 N2 N4 N7 N18 Peak-time 73（高峰73）	0.90	23.25	Luohu
Xiangxicun	向西村		5 14 69 83 97 229 336 369 381 387 395 E26 M172 M182 M360 N2 N14 N18	1.00	24.25	Luohu
Wenjin	文锦		5 14 69 83 97 229 312 336 381 387 395 E26 M172 M182 M360 M445 N2 N14 N18 Peak-time 97（高峰97）	0.75	25.00	Luohu

== Line 10 ==
Service routes		Station name		Connections	Nearby bus stops	Distance km	Location
Service routes		English	Chinese	Connections	Nearby bus stops	Distance km	Location
●		Shuangyong Street	双拥街				Longgang
●		Pinghu	平湖	PHQ			Longgang
●		Hehua	禾花				Longgang
●		Huanancheng	华南城				Longgang
●		Mugu	木古				Longgang
●		Shanglilang	上李朗				Longgang
●		Liangmao Hill	凉帽山				Longgang
●	↑	Gankeng	甘坑				Longgang
●	↑	Xuexiang	雪象				Longgang
●	↑	Gangtou	岗头				Longgang
●	↑	Huawei	华为				Longgang
●	↑	Bei'er Road	贝尔路				Longgang
●	↑	Bantian North	坂田北				Longgang
●	↑	Wuhe	五和	5			Longgang
●	↑	Guangyayuan	光雅园				Longgang
●	↑	Nankeng	南坑				Longgang
●	↑	Yabao	雅宝				Longgang
●	↑	Maling	孖岭	9			Futian
●	↑	Donggualing	冬瓜岭				Futian
●	↑	Lianhuacun	莲花村	3			Futian
●	↑	Gangxia North	岗厦北	2 11 14			Futian
●	↑	Gangxia	岗厦	1			Futian
●	↑	Fumin	福民	4 7			Futian
●	↑	Futian Checkpoint	福田口岸	4 (Note: Out-of-station interchange.) ( East Rail line (Note: System transfer via Lok Ma Chau [through border check].))			Futian

== Line 11 ==
Service routes		Station name		Connections	Nearby bus stops	Distance km		Location
Service routes		English	Chinese	Connections	Nearby bus stops	Distance km		Location
●	●	Bitou	碧头		长安26 656 M495	0.00	0.00	Bao'an
●	●	Songgang	松岗	6 12	656 B641 M255 M291 M490 M512	1.90	1.90	Bao'an
●	●	Houting	后亭		652 656 779 782 B774 B867 B895 M442	2.30	4.20	Bao'an
●	●	Shajing	沙井		639 656 780 782 B716 B776 B894 M284 M333 M387 M397	2.40	6.60	Bao'an
●	●	Ma'anshan	马安山		782 M284 M387 M397	1.75	8.35	Bao'an
●	●	Tangwei	塘尾		327 866 868区间2 B893 M237 M251 M252 M367 M387	1.75	10.10	Bao'an
●	●	Qiaotou	桥头		866 868区间2 B876 B892 M291 M310 M387	1.70	11.80	Bao'an
●	●	Fuyong	福永	12	338 639 866 868区间2 B898 M251 M252 M291 M310 M351 M387 M472 M514	1.75	13.55	Bao'an
●	●	Airport North	机场北	20		2.65	16.20	Bao'an
●	●	Airport	机场	SZX	330/Airport 1（机场1）330B 330C 790 E16 E21 M416 M371 M387 M387区间 M416 Airport 2（机场2） Airport 4（机场4） Airport 6（机场6） Airport 7（机场7） Airport 8（机场8） Airport 9（机场9） Airport 10（机场10）	3.65	19.85	Bao'an
●	●	Bihaiwan	碧海湾		320 718 797 B847 B887 B910 M200 M473	7.00	26.85	Bao'an
●	●	Bao'an	宝安		631 797 B630 B828 E15 M200 M210 M376 M473 M507	3.40	30.25	Bao'an
●	●	Qianhaiwan	前海湾	1 5		2.70	32.95	Nanshan
●	●	Nanshan	南山	12	58 74 79 204 331 332 337 369 382 390 B682 M206 M222 M241 M242 M347 M370 M371 M463 M483 M506 N4 Peak-time 12（高峰12） European City Line	4.20	37.15	Nanshan
●	●	Houhai	后海	2 13	M299 M429 M467 M474 M483 M493 N24 Peak-time 10（高峰10）	1.90	39.05	Nanshan
●	●	Hongshuwan South	红树湾南	9		3.25	42.30	Nanshan
●	●	Chegongmiao	车公庙	1 7 9	21 26 28 79 101 113 123 202 204 209 213 222 223 234 303 324 326 338 365 372 M191 M372 M391 M392 M413 M414 M435 M447 M448 M500 N4 N6 Peak-time 18（高峰18） Peak-time 62（高峰62） Peak-time 119（高峰119）	5.75	48.05	Futian
●	●	Futian	福田	2 3 Futian	32 101 113 123 204 223 234 327 330/Airport 1（机场1） B613 E18 E28 K204 M221 M413 N4 Peak-time 15（高峰15） Peak-time 18（高峰18） Peak-time 38（高峰38） Peak-time 49（高峰49） Peak-time 62（高峰62） Peak-time 119（高峰119）	3.10	51.93	Futian
●	●	Gangxia North	岗厦北	2 10 14	101 113 204 223 303 320 326 M102 M103 M106 M133 M190 M447 M448 Peak-express 47（高快47）Peak-express 60（高快60）Peak-time 3（高峰3）Peak-time 49（高峰49）Peak-time 119（高峰119）Peak-time 221（高峰221）	1.60	53.53	Futian
●	●	Fuxing	福星					Futian
●	●	Huaqiang South	华强南	7				Futian
●	●	Hongling South	红岭南	9 (OSI); 1 2 5 (via Grand Theater)				Luohu

== Line 12 ==
Station name		Connections	Nearby bus stops	Distance km		Location
English	Chinese	Connections	Nearby bus stops	Distance km		Location
Zuopaotai East	左炮台东		70 M400	-	0	Nanshan
Taiziwan	太子湾		M105 M448			Nanshan
Sea World	海上世界	2	37 113 122 204 226 B607 M105 M106 M133 M400 M409 M430 M448 M493 M519 M527			Nanshan
Huaguoshan	花果山		113 M133 M241 M409 M448 M493 M527			Nanshan
Sihai	四海		113 122 204 B605 B817 M106 M133 M241 M400 M409 M448 M484 M527			Nanshan
Nanyou	南油	9	113 122 226 328 M106 M133 M242 M398 M448 M467 M506 M527			Nanshan
Nanguang	南光		74 204 369 B615 E3 M105 M241 M372 M483 M506 N4			Nanshan
Nanshan	南山	11	58 74 204 369 377 E3 M105 M182 M222 M241 M347 M372 M463 M483 M506 M562 N4			Nanshan
Taoyuan	桃园	1	58 74 204 223 226 234 337 369 E3 M176 M182 M222 M241 M242 M349 M372 M463 M479 M492 M562 N4 NM242			Nanshan
Nantou Ancient City	南头古城		21 22 42 122 201 204 320 323 324 328 337 338 395 M176 M191 M194 M200 M241 M349 M358 M364 M413 M435 M463 M492 M506 M527 M530 N4 Peak-express 32（高快32）Peak-time 62（高峰62）Charming-Bay-Area Line（魅力湾区线）			Nanshan
Zhongshan Park	中山公园		21 22 37 122 201 206 324 B627 M176 M241 M298 M349 M475 M492 M506 Peak-time 62（高峰62）			Nanshan
Tongle South	同乐南		M245 M249 M349			Nanshan
Xin'an Park	新安公园		605 606 615 718 B832 B904 M206 M245 M246 M349 M377 M469 M550 Peak-time 172（高峰172）			Bao'an
Lingzhi	灵芝	5	395 606 610 615 629 B831 B832 E23 M182 M197 M245 M249 M250 M313 M378 M393 M395 M518 Peak-express 33（高快33）Peak-time 121（高峰121）			Bao'an
Shangchuan	上川		395 603 615 629 704 718 B831 M182 M197 M245 M246 M250 M259 M313 M379 M382 M393 M469 M518 M560			Bao'an
Liutang	流塘		606 718 B864 M131 M250 M259 M313 M376 M393			Bao'an
Bao'an Passenger Transport Terminal	宝安客运站		395 603 605 606 718 B834 B864 M131 M191 M209 M235 M241 M242 M250 M313 M375 M393 M528 Peak-express 29（高快29）Peak-express 47（高快47）Peak-time 179（高峰179）			Bao'an
Baotian 1st Road	宝田一路		395 603 606 704 707 E36 M210 M250 M350 M355 Peak-express 32（高快32）Peak-express 47（高快47）			Bao'an
Pingluan Hill	平峦山		395 603 707 E36 M210 M246 M250 M350 M355			Bao'an
Xixiang Taoyuan	西乡桃源		395 603 707 E23 E36 M210 M250 M350 M355 M358 M470 Peak-express 32（高快32）Peak-express 47（高快47）			Bao'an
Zhongwu South	钟屋南		B965 M179 M246 M350 M511 M558			Bao'an
Huangtian	黄田		337 362 629 B836 E16 E40 M246 M335 M350 M395 M413 M435 M511 M522 M531 Peak-express 29（高快29）Peak-time 121（高峰121）			Bao'an
Xingwei	兴围		337 362 629 B827 B875 B929 E16 E40 M335 M350 M395 M413 M435 M531 Peak-express 29（高快29）Peak-time 121（高峰121）			Bao'an
Airport East	机场东	1	338 615 B875 B929 M237 M291 M331 M332 M334 M351 M370 M387 M395 M419 M472 M530 M531			Bao'an
Fuwei	福围		338 615 B875 B929 M237 M291 M331 M334 M351 M371 M387 M419 M472 M530			Bao'an
Huaide	怀德		615 B635 B875 M159 M251 M310 M514 M530 M531			Bao'an
Fuyong	福永	11	338 B635 B929 M159 M236 M237 M251 M252 M291 M310 M331 M351 M387 M395 M472 M514			Bao'an
Qiaotou West	桥头西		M251			Bao'an
Fuhai West	福海西					Bao'an
Shenzhen World	国展	20	615 B892 M515			Bao'an
Shenzhen World North	国展北	20	B892 M515			Bao'an
Waterlands Resort South	海上田园南					Bao'an
Waterlands Resort East	海上田园东		337 652 779 M331			Bao'an
Haoxiang	蚝乡					Bao'an
Shahao	沙蚝					Bao'an
Shajing Ancient Market	沙井古墟					Bao'an
Buchong	步涌					Bao'an
Langxia	朗下					Bao'an
Songgang	松岗	6 11				Bao'an

== Line 13 ==
Station name		Connections	Nearby bus stops	Distance km	Location
English	Chinese	Connections	Nearby bus stops	Distance km	Location
Shenzhen Bay Checkpoint	深圳湾口岸				Nanshan
Talent Park	人才公园				Nanshan
Houhai	后海	2 11			Nanshan
Keyuan	科苑	2			Nanshan
Yuehaimen	粤海门	9			Nanshan
Shenzhen University	深大	1			Nanshan
Hi-Tech Central	高新中				Nanshan
Hi-Tech Central	高新中				Nanshan
Hi-Tech North	高新北				Nanshan
Xili High Speed Railway Station	西丽高铁站	ELQ; 15 27 29			Nanshan
Shigu	石鼓				Nanshan
Liuxiandong	留仙洞	5			Nanshan
Baiwang	百旺				Nanshan
Yingrenshi	应人石				Bao'an
Luozu	罗租				Bao'an
Shiyan	石岩				Bao'an
Shangwu	上屋	6			Bao'an
Hong'ao Park	红坳公园				Guangming
Guangmingcheng	光明城	6B IMQ			Guangming
Deya Road	德雅路				Guangming
Fenghuang Town	凤凰城	6			Guangming
Yueliang Road	月亮路				Guangming
Jiangwei	将围				Guangming
Xinzhuang	新庄				Guangming
Gongming Square	公明广场	6			Guangming
Shangcun	上村				Guangming
Xiacun	下村				Guangming
Lisonglang	李松蓢				Guangming

== Line 14 ==
Service Route			Station name		Connections	Nearby bus stops	Distance km		Location
L	D	E	English	Chinese	Connections	Nearby bus stops	Distance km		Location
●	●	●	Gangxia North	岗厦北	2 10 11	101 113 204 223 303 320 326 M102 M103 M106 M133 M190 M447 M448 Peak-express 47（高快47）Peak-express 60（高快60）Peak-time 3（高峰3）Peak-time 49（高峰49）Peak-time 119（高峰119）Peak-time 221（高峰221）	0.0	0.0	Futian
●	●	●	Huangmugang	黄木岗	7	11 12 58 111 216 222 323 E5 E11 M194 M202 M203 M207 M213 M224 M329 M401 M417 M453 M454 M588	2.8	2.8	Futian
●	↑	▲	Luohu North	罗湖北	17; Luohu North (U/C)	M140 M482	4.0	6.8	Luohu
●	●	●	Buji	布吉	3 5 BJQ	8 85 321 322 357 366 371 376 977 980 M139 M172 M183 M192 M194 M224 M239 M244 M265 M267 M271 M272 M273 M283 M295 M311 M329 M358 M403 M404 M406 M408 M414 M415 M485 M541 M588 M589 Wutong-Hill 2（梧桐山2）	2.8	9.6	Longgang
●	↑	●	Shiyaling	石芽岭	17	322 977 B741 M150 M192 M203 M224 M227 M273 M281 M300 M301 M311 M324 M329 M363 M402 M403 M404 M491 M508 M547 M565 M589 Peak-time 183（高峰183）	3.6	13.2	Longgang
●	↑	●	Liuyue North	六约北		8 61 979 M190 M229 M266 M324 Peak-time 29（高峰29）Dameisha-holiday 2（大梅沙假日2）	4.3	17.5	Longgang
●	↑	●	Silian	四联	18	906 B916 M208 M229 M466 M563 M570 Dongguan 781（莞781）	2.2	19.7	Longgang
●	↑	▲	Aobei	坳背	21	Anliang 930（930安良线）	3.2	22.9	Longgang
●	●	●	Universiade	大运	3 16	351 358 Express-358 833 923 E23 E33 E34 M219 M229 M239 M266 M294 M303 M317 M318 M322 M357 M359 M360 M396 M446 M547 M593 Peak-time 146（高峰146）Peak-time 957（高峰957）Dongguan 786（莞786）	2.7	25.6	Longgang
●	↑	|	Zhangbei	嶂背		B867	3.2	28.8	Longgang
●	↑	●	Nanyue	南约		B910 B912 B913 M220 M303 M308 M322 M357 M394 M447 M458 M466 M304-clockwise（304顺时针）M546-clockwise（546顺时针）	3.1	31.9	Longgang
●	↑	|	Baolong	宝龙		B922 M220 M308 M317 M322 M447 M458 M546-clockwise（546顺时针）	2.1	34.0	Longgang
●	↑	●	Jinlong	锦龙	19	366 833 941 A5 B678 M143 M220 M288 M294 M295 M325 M326 M439 M447 M480 M546-clockwise（546顺时针）M546-anticlockwise（546逆时针）Pingmei-holiday-express（坪梅假日快线）	4.4	38.4	Pingshan
●	↑	●	Pingshanwei	坪山围	16	366 833 915 941 963 964 978 B760 E22 M136 M277 M288 M295 M296 M325 M326 M361 M434 M439 M443 M479 M564 M575 M546-clockwise（546顺时针）M546-anticlockwise（546逆时针）	1.6	40.0	Pingshan
●	↑	|	Pingshan Square	坪山广场		366 833 915 941 963 964 939A 939B 978 B760 B923 B935 E22 E34 M288 M295 M296 M325 M326 M361 M434 M439 M440 M443 M479 M497 M575 Pingmei-holiday-express（坪梅假日快线）	1.2	41.2	Pingshan
●	↑	|	Pingshan Center	坪山中心	19 Pingshan SkyShuttle Line 1	366 978 B935 E34 M136 M325 M326 M361 M422 M434 M478	1.1	42.3	Pingshan
●	↑	|	Kengzi	坑梓		366 978 B675 B938 B950 E22 E34 M136 M293 M295 M297 M361 M384 M396 M427 M434 M478	4.6	46.9	Pingshan
●	●	●	Shatian	沙田		B761 B961 E34 M136 M187 M361 M427 M434 M478 M571 Peak-time 151（高峰151）Dayawan 266（大亚湾266）Dayawan 268（大亚湾268）Huiyang 7（惠阳7）Huiyang 163（惠阳163）Huiyang 168B（惠阳168B）Shenhui 2（深惠7）Shenhui 2-branch（深惠2支）	3.4	50.3	Pingshan

== Line 16 ==
Station name		Connections	Nearby bus stops	Distance km		Location
English	Chinese	Connections	Nearby bus stops	Distance km		Location
Yuanshan Xikeng	园山西坑					Longgang
Anliang	安良					Longgang
Fukeng	福坑					Longgang
Dakang	大康					Longgang
Yuanshan	园山					Longgang
Da'an	大安					Longgang
Jixi	吉溪					Longgang
Jinyuan	金源					Longgang
Universiade	大运	3 14	351 358 833 923 E23 E33 E34 M219 M229 M239 M266 M294 M303 M317 M318 M322 M357 M359 M360 M396 M446 M547 M593 358-express（358快）Peak-time 146（高峰146）Peak-time 957（高峰957）Dongguan 786（莞786）	0.00	0.00	Longgang
Universiade Center	大运中心		802 923 E5 E6 E27 M139 M229 M315 M317 M318 M360 M386 M446 M447 Peak-express 81（高快81）Dongguan 782（莞782）			Longgang
Longcheng Park	龙城公园		E25 E27 M139 M229 M230 M318 M320 M360 M386 M446 M447 Peak-express 81（高快81）			Longgang
Huanggekeng	黄阁坑		810 818 833 862 E5 E25 E27 M139 M220 M229 M230 M276 M280 M317 M360 M386 M446 M447 M589 M593 Peak-express 81（高快81）Peak-time 185（高峰185）			Longgang
Yuyuan	愉园		M230 M276 M317 M361 M446 M458 Peak-time 185（高峰185）			Longgang
Huilongpu	回龙埔		818 923 B872 E5 M229 M275 M276 M303 M306 M317 M361 M446 M304-clockwise（304顺时针）Peak-express 56（高快56）Peak-time 123（高峰123）Huizhou 208（惠州208）			Longgang
Shangjing	尚景		M303 M306 M317 M319 M501A M501B Peak-time 185（高峰185）			Longgang
Shengping	盛平		802 B629 M276 M303 M317 M386 M556 M304-clockwise（304顺时针）			Longgang
Longyuan	龙园		358 810 M276 M277 M308 M386 M556 358-Express（358快）M304-clockwise（304顺时针）M304-anticlockwise（304逆时针）			Longgang
Shuanglong	双龙	3	351 810 811 818 862 E6 E7 E23 E25 E33 E34 M136 M139 M219 M230 M239 M266 M275 M276 M277 M280 M307 M308 M359 M361 M386 M396 M304-clockwise（304顺时针）M305-clockwise（305顺时针）Peak-time 17（高峰17）			Longgang
Xintangwei	新塘围		802 818 E6 E33 E34 M136 M230 M266 M277 M279 M296 M359 M361 M304-clockwise（304顺时针）M305-clockwise（305顺时针）			Longgang
Longdong	龙东		802 818 E34 M136 M230 M266 M277 M279 M296 M320 M359 M361 M304-clockwise（304顺时针）			Longgang
Baolong Tongle	宝龙同乐		802 818 E34 M136 M266 M277 M279 M288 M296 M359 M361 M395			Longgang
Pingshan	坪山	IFQ; Pingshan SkyShuttle Line 1	802 915 939A 939B 963 978 B760 B923 M288 M293 M308 M317 M325 M359 M426 M427 M440 M443 M478 M479 M480 M497 M546-clockwise（546顺时针）M546-anticlockwise（546逆时针）Pingmei-holiday-express（坪梅假日快线）			Pingshan
Xinhe	新和	19	B923			Pingshan
Liuhe	六和		818 939A 939B 941 963 964 978 B811 E34 M136 M277 M279 M296 M325 M357 M361 M368 M434 M443 M447 M480 M564			Pingshan
Pingshanwei	坪山围	14	366 833 915 941 963 964 978 B760 E22 M136 M277 M288 M295 M296 M325 M326 M361 M434 M439 M443 M479 M564 M575 M546-clockwise（546顺时针）M546-anticlockwise（546逆时针）			Pingshan
Pinghuan	坪环		818 915 939A 939B 964 B760 M143 M279 M357 M479 M480 M564 M575 M546-clockwise（546顺时针）M546-anticlockwise（546逆时针）			Pingshan
Dongjiang Column Memorial Hall	东纵纪念馆	Pingshan SkyShuttle Line 1	818 939A 939B 964 M143 M279 M357 M479 M564 M571 M575 M546-clockwise（546顺时针）M546-anticlockwise（546逆时针）			Pingshan
Shabo	沙壆		818 939A 939B E17 M151 M279 M357 M426 M564 M546-clockwise（546顺时针）M546-anticlockwise（546逆时针）Peak-time 175（高峰175）			Pingshan
Yanzihu	燕子湖		818 939A 939B M151 M279 M294 M357 M426 M564 M576			Pingshan
Shijing	石井		939A 939B E17 M151 M294 M440 M576			Pingshan
Technology University	技术大学		939A 939B E17 M151 M189 M296			Pingshan
Tianxin	田心		939A 939B M189 M296 M440 Dayawan 138B（大亚湾138B）			Pingshan

== Line 20 ==
Station name		Connections	Nearby bus stops	Distance km		Location
English	Chinese	Connections	Nearby bus stops	Distance km		Location
Convention & Exhibition City	会展城			0.0	0.0	Bao'an
Shenzhen World North	国展北	12	B892 M515	1.6	1.6	Bao'an
Shenzhen World	国展	12	615 B892 M515	0.8	2.4	Bao'an
Shenzhen World South	国展南		M341	1.3	3.7	Bao'an
Airport North	机场北	11 SZX		4.4	8.1	Bao'an
