= Airport North station =

Airport North station may refer to:

- Airport North station (Guangzhou Metro), a station on the Guangzhou Metro in Guangzhou, Guangdong.
- Airport North station (Shenzhen Metro), a station on the Shenzhen Metro in Shenzhen, Guangdong.
