= Shenzhen World station =

Shenzhen Metro Line 12 and Line 20 station

Shenzhen World 国展
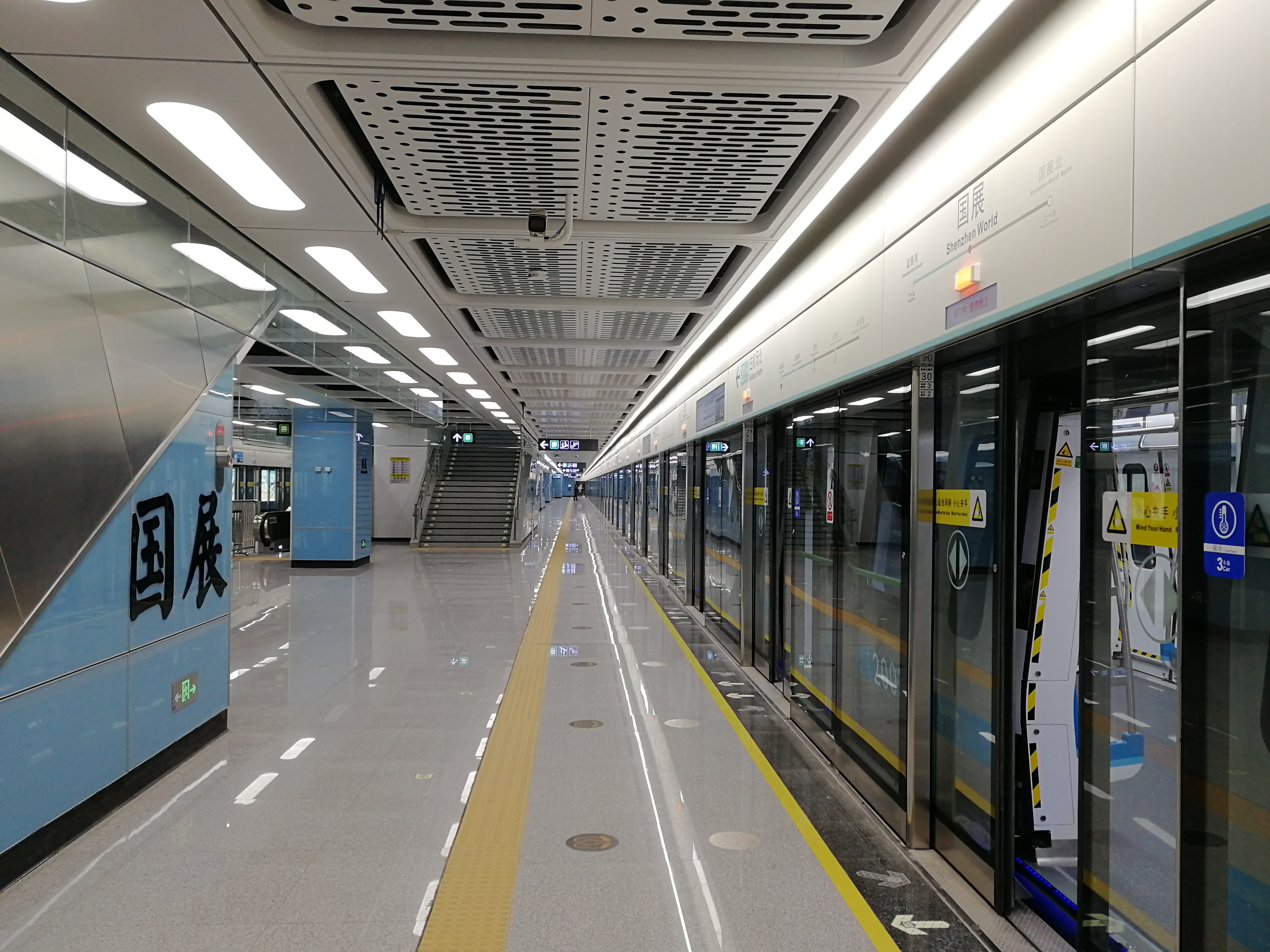
- Line 20 platform

Chinese name
- Traditional Chinese: 國展
- Simplified Chinese: 国展
Transcriptions
Standard Mandarin
- Hanyu Pinyin: Guózhǎn
Yue: Cantonese
- Yale Romanization: Gwokjín
- Jyutping: Gwok3 Zin2

General information
- Location: Intersection of Exhibition City Road and Jingfang Road; Fuhai Subdistrict, Bao'an District, Shenzhen, Guangdong; China
- Coordinates: 22°41′54.10″N 113°46′24.31″E
- Operator: SZMC (Shenzhen Metro Group); Shenzhen Line 12 Rail Transit Co., Ltd (Shenzhen Metro Group and PowerChina PPP)
- Lines: Line 12; Line 20
- Platforms: 4 (2 island platforms)
- Tracks: 4

Construction
- Structure type: Underground
- Accessible: Yes

History
- Opened: Line 20: 28 December 2021 (4 years ago); Line 12: 28 November 2022; 3 years ago

Services
| Preceding station | Shenzhen Metro | Following station |
|---|---|---|
| Shenzhen World North towards Songgang | Line 12 | Fuhai West towards Zuopaotai East |
| Shenzhen World North towards Convention & Exhibition City | Line 20 | Shenzhen World South towards Airport North |
Location

Shenzhen World (simplified Chinese: 国展站; traditional Chinese: 國展站; pinyin: Guózhǎn Zhàn; Cantonese Yale: Gwokjín Jaahm) station is an interchange station for Line 12 and Line 20 of Shenzhen Metro in Shenzhen, Guangdong, China. Line 20 platforms opened on 28 December 2021 and Line 12 platforms opened on 28 November 2022. It is located in Bao'an District, adjacent to Shenzhen World Exhibition & Convention Center.

== Station layout ==
| G | - | Exit |
| B1F; Concourse | Lobby | Ticket Machines, Customer Service, Station Control Room |
| B2F; Platforms | Platform | 12 towards Songgang (Shenzhen World North) |
| B2F; Platforms | Island platform, doors will open on the left |
| B2F; Platforms | Platform | 12 towards Zuopaotai East (Fuhai West) |
| B2F; Platforms | Platform | 20 towards Convention and Exhibition City (Shenzhen World North) |
| B2F; Platforms | Island platform, doors will open on the left |
| B2F; Platforms | Platform | 20 towards Airport North (Shenzhen World South) |

== Exits ==
| Exit | | Destination |
|---|---|---|
| Exit A | | Exhibition City Road (E) |
| Exit C | C1 | Exhibition City Road (W), Jingfang Road (S), South Entrance Hall of Shenzhen World Convention and Exhibition Center (Halls 9–16) |
| Exit C | C2 | Exhibition City Road (W), Jingfang Road (S), South Entrance Hall of Shenzhen World Convention and Exhibition Center (Halls 9–16) |
| Exit D | | Exhibition City Road (W), Exhibition View Road (N), Shenzhen World Exhibition & Convention Center (Halls 1–8) |

== Gallery ==
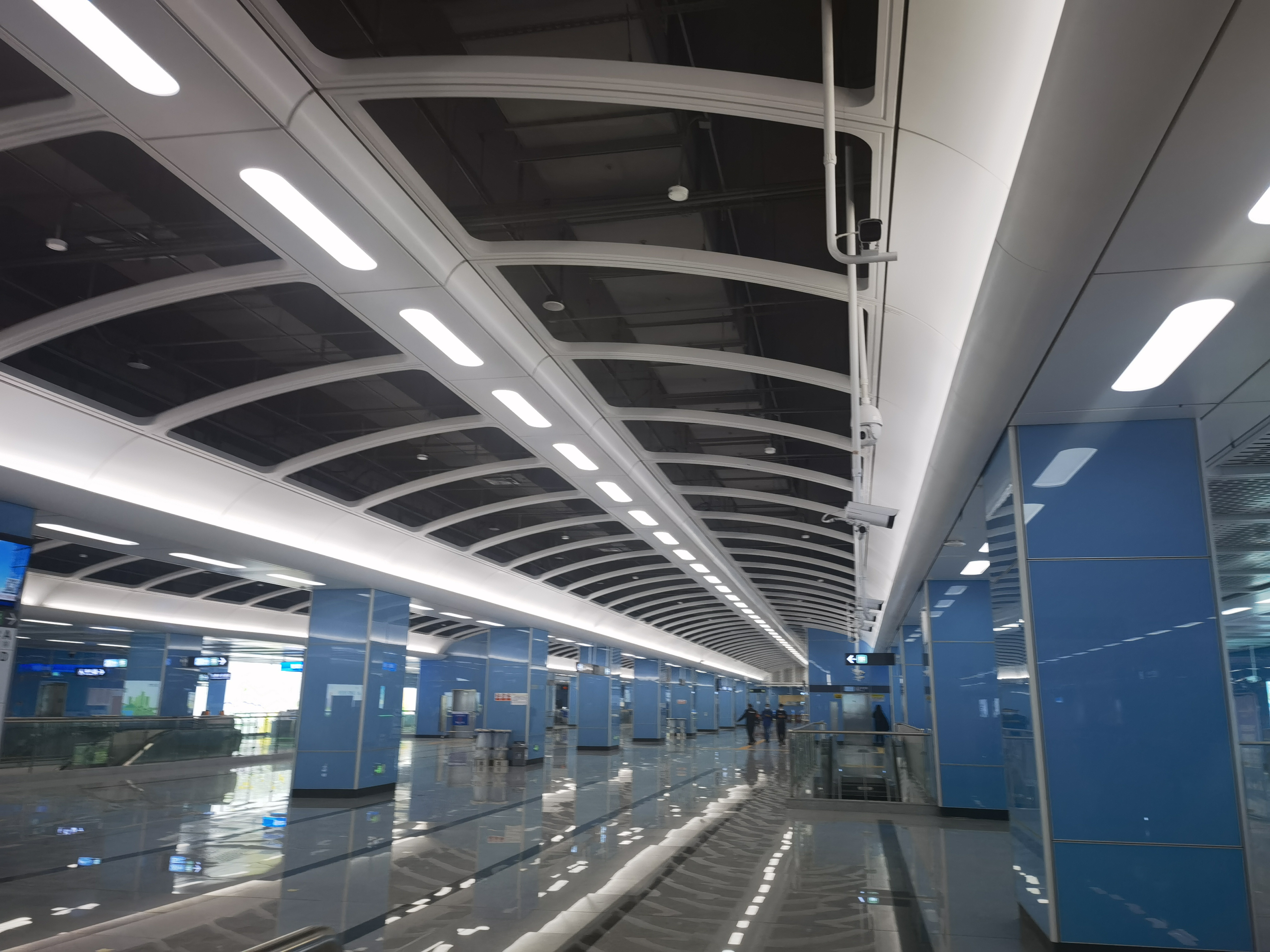
Concourse

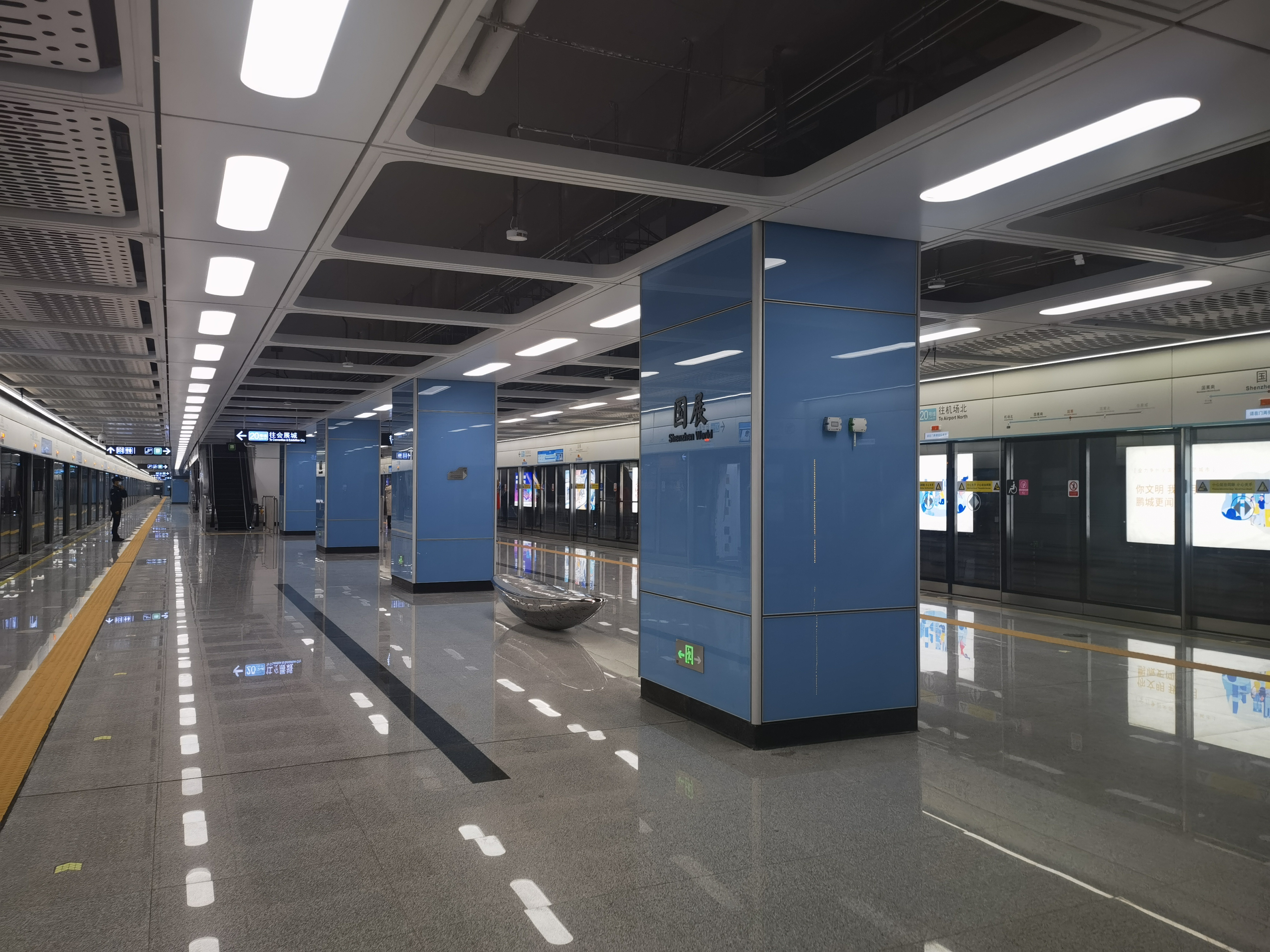
Line 20 platform

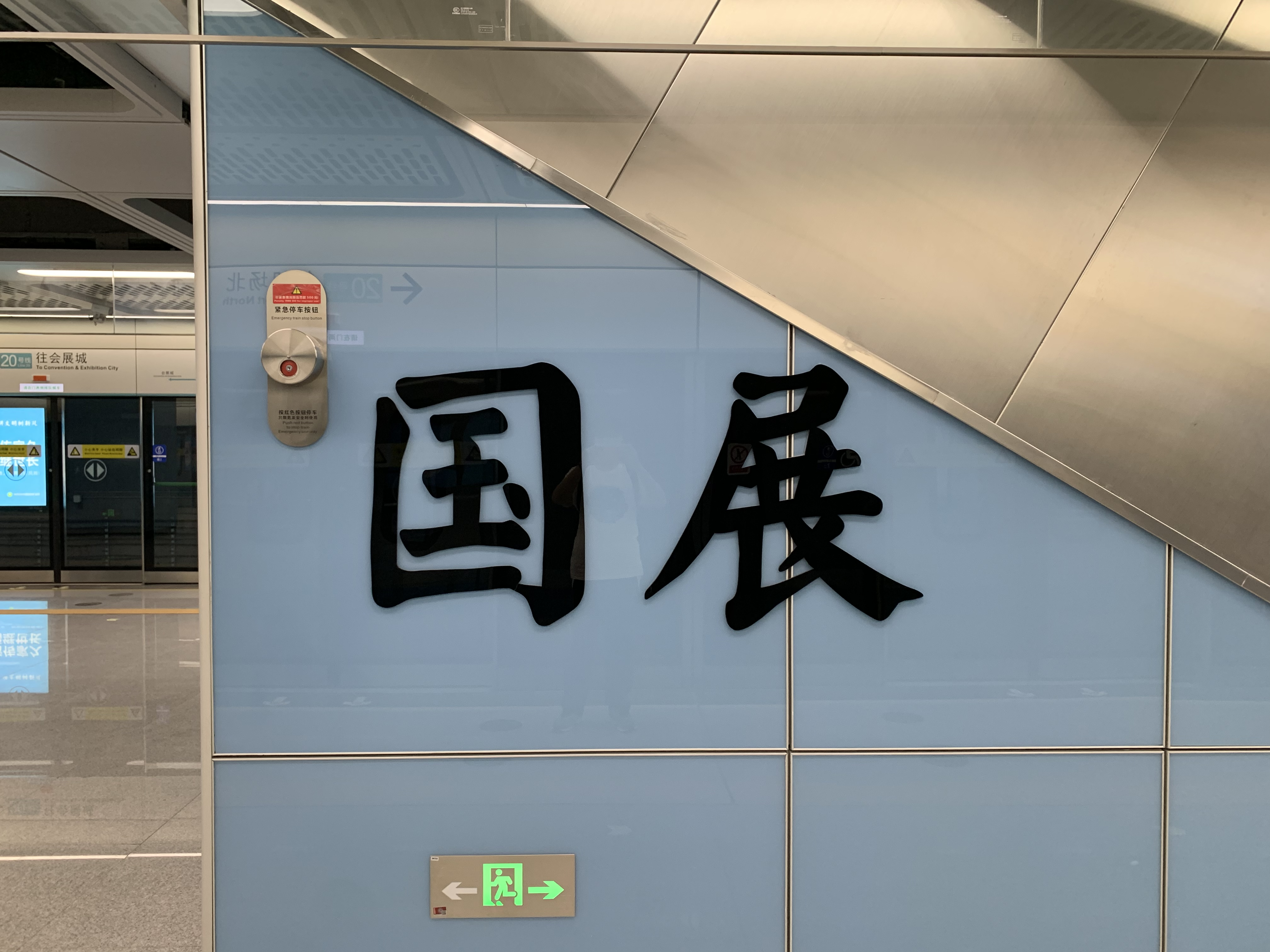
Line 20 calligraphy

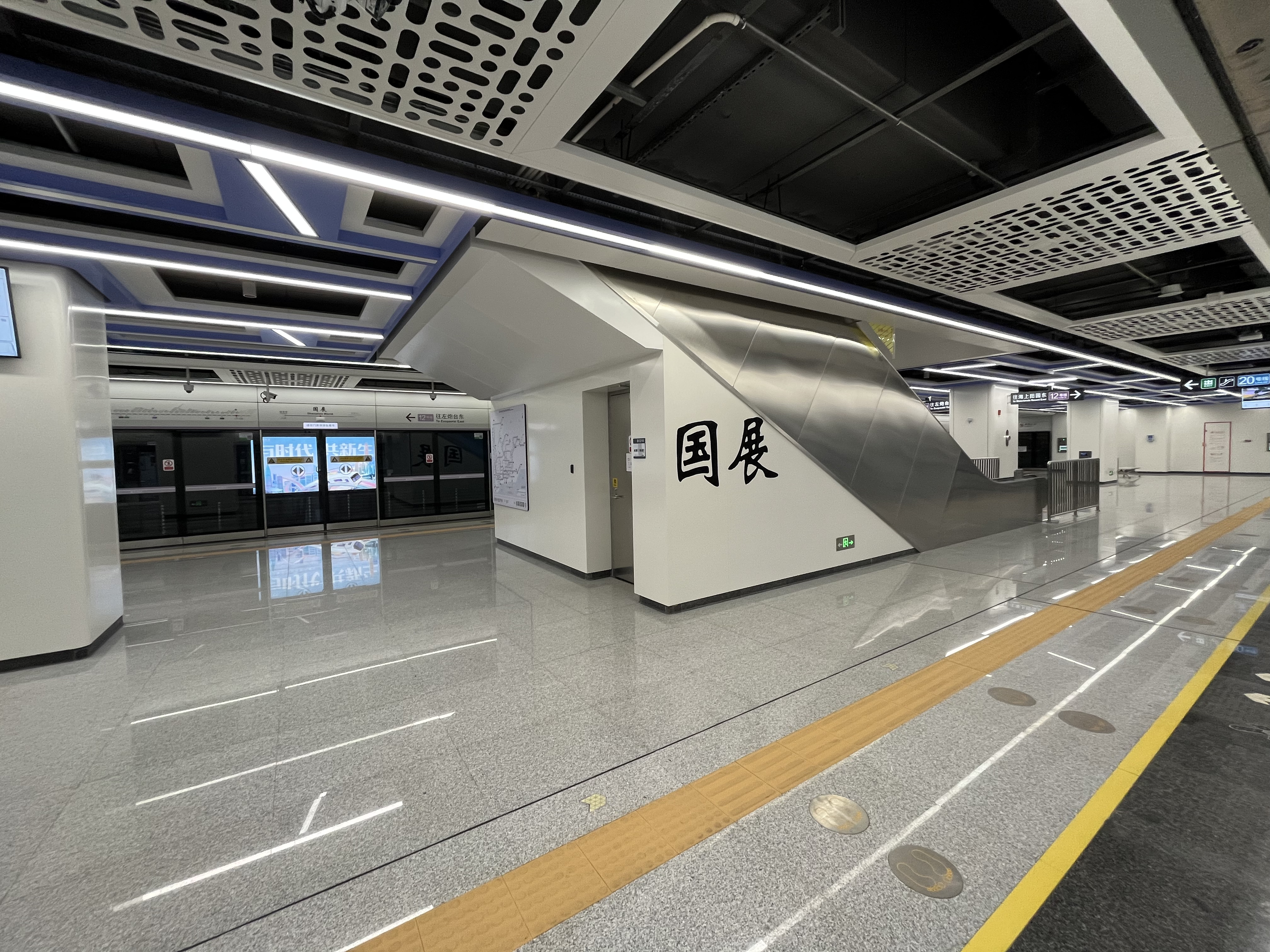
Line 12 platform

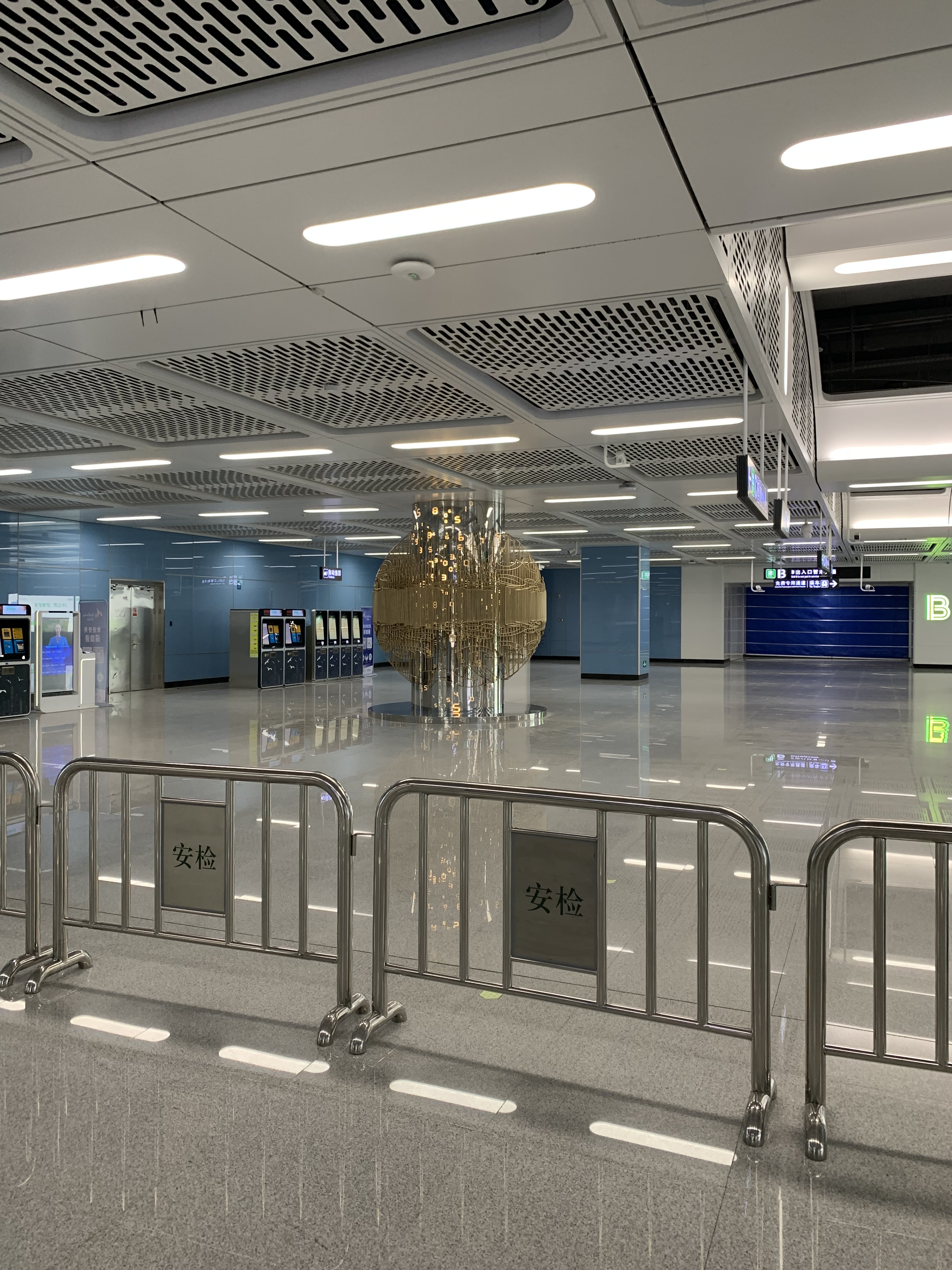
Station art 1

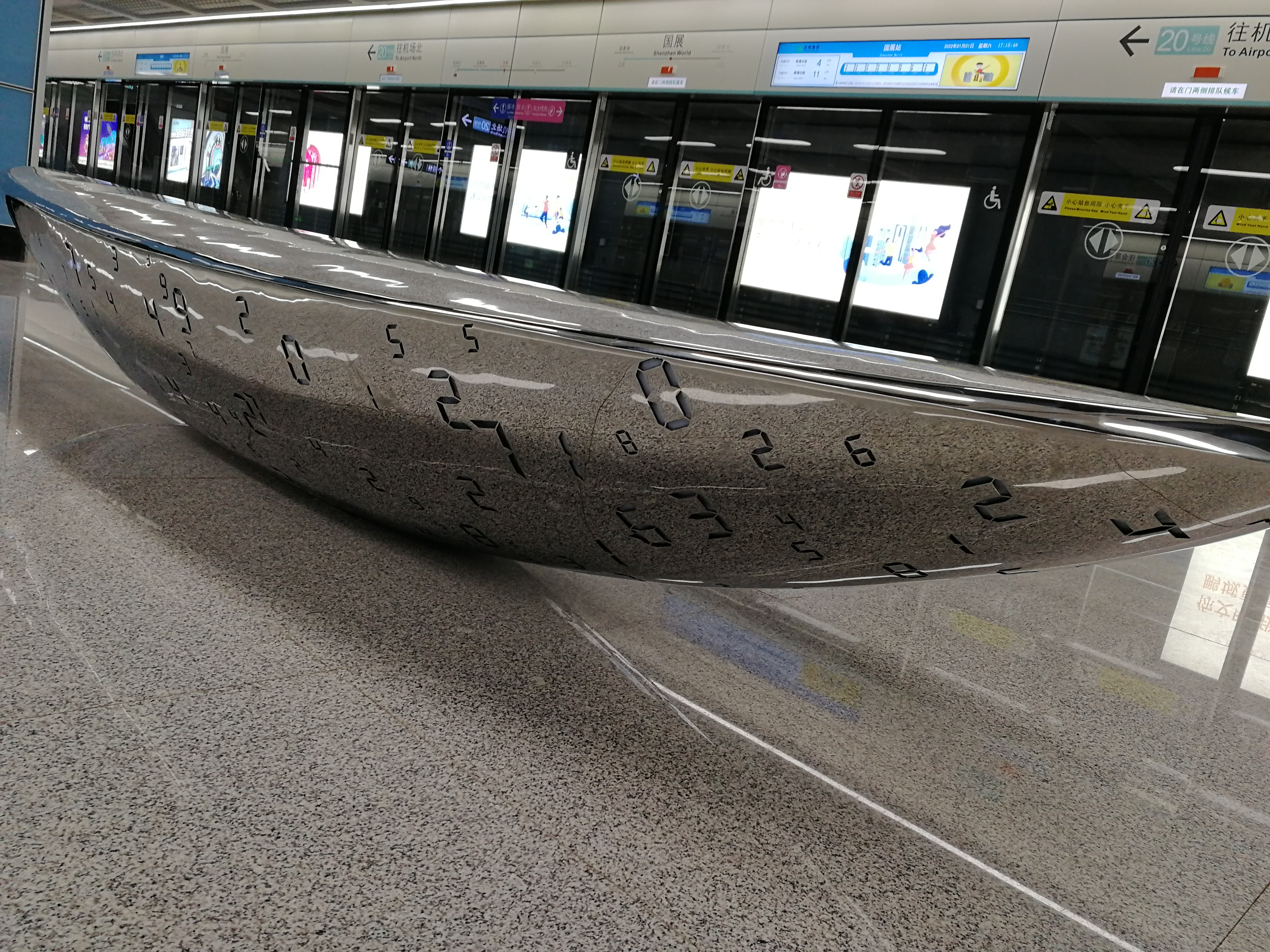
Station art 2

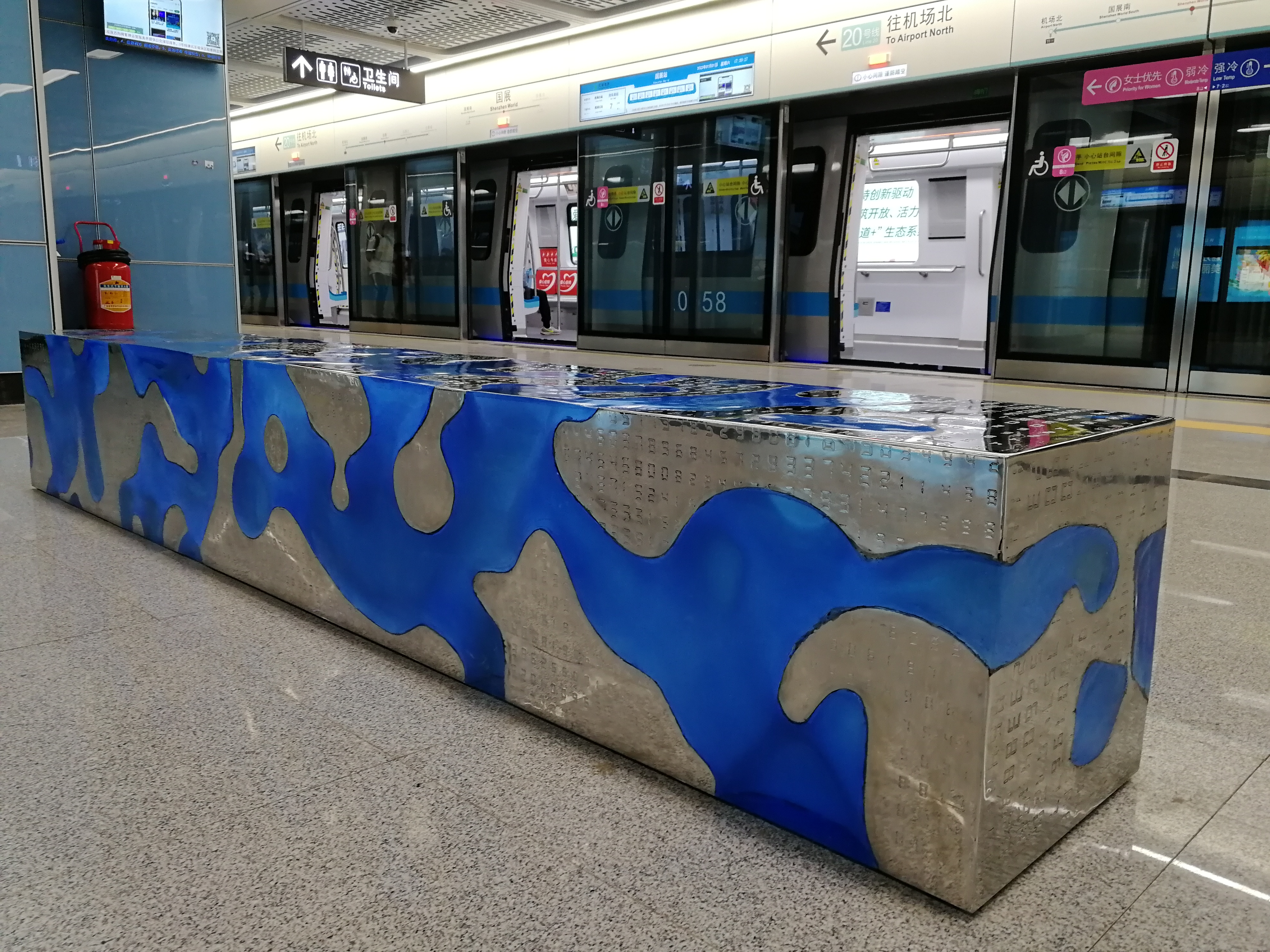
Station art 3
