= Shenzhen World North station =

Shenzhen Metro Line 12 and Line 20 station

Shenzhen World North 国展北
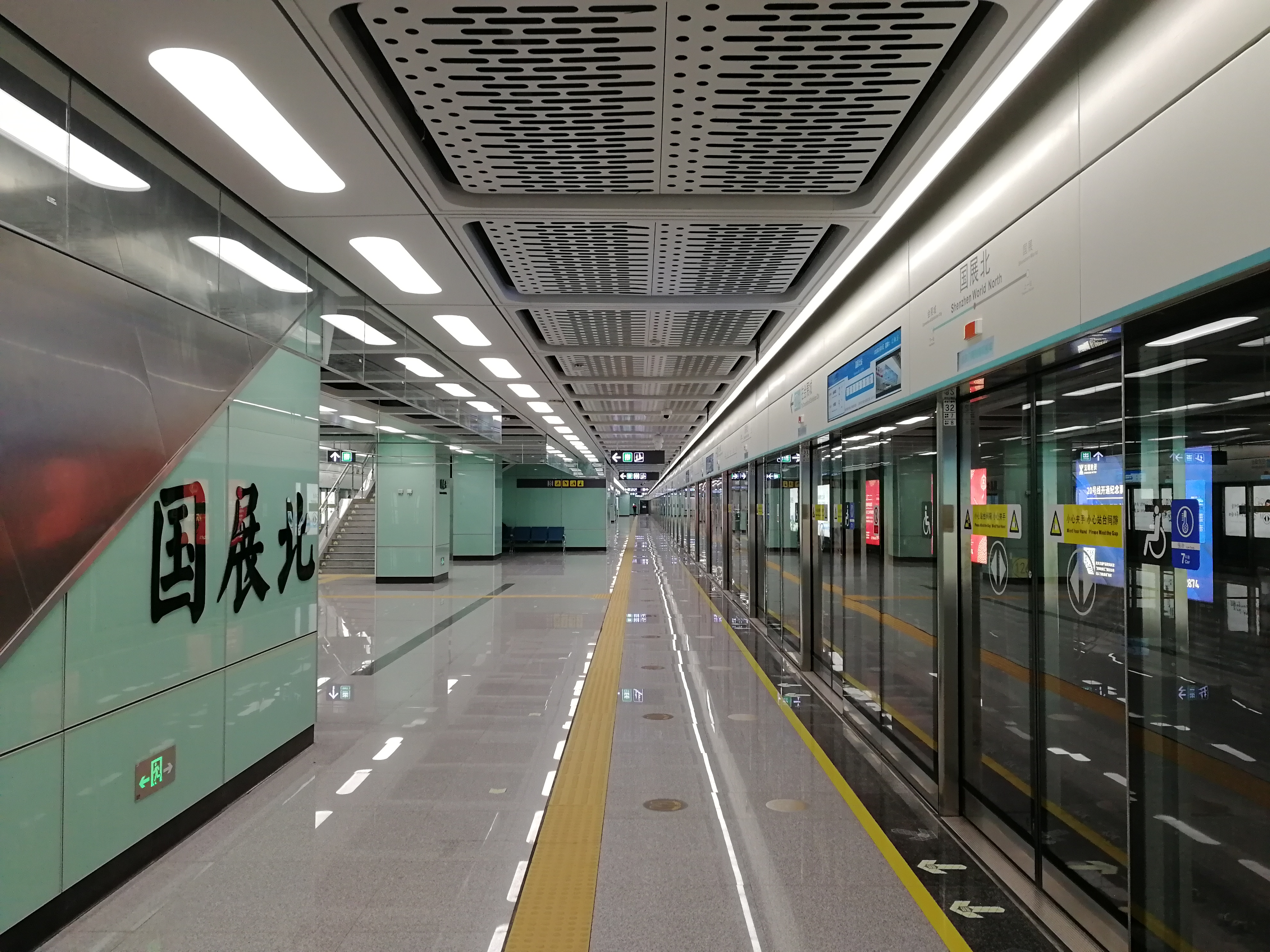
- Line 20 platform

Chinese name
- Traditional Chinese: 國展北
- Simplified Chinese: 国展北
Transcriptions
Standard Mandarin
- Hanyu Pinyin: Guózhǎn Běi
Yue: Cantonese
- Yale Romanization: Gwokjín Bāk
- Jyutping: Gwok3 Zin2 Bak1

General information
- Location: North of the intersection of Exhibition City Road and Fengtang Avenue; Fuhai Subdistrict, Bao'an District, Shenzhen, Guangdong; China
- Coordinates: 22°42′16.88″N 113°46′20.96″E
- Operator: SZMC (Shenzhen Metro Group); Shenzhen Line 12 Rail Transit Co., Ltd (Shenzhen Metro Group and PowerChina PPP)
- Lines: Line 12; Line 20
- Platforms: 4 (2 island platforms)
- Tracks: 4

Construction
- Structure type: Underground
- Accessible: Yes

History
- Opened: Line 20: 28 December 2021 (4 years ago); Line 12: 28 November 2022 (3 years ago)

Services
Preceding station	Shenzhen Metro	Following station
Waterlands Resort South towards Songgang	Line 12	Shenzhen World towards Zuopaotai East
Convention & Exhibition City Terminus	Line 20	Shenzhen World towards Airport North
Location

Shenzhen World North (simplified Chinese: 国展北站; traditional Chinese: 國展北; pinyin: Guózhǎn Běi Zhàn; Cantonese Yale: Gwokjín Bāk Jaahm) station is an interchange station for Line 12 and Line 20 of Shenzhen Metro in Shenzhen, Guangdong, China. Line 20 platforms opened on 28 December 2021 and Line 12 platforms opened on 28 November 2022. It is located in Bao'an District.

== Station layout ==
G	-	Exit
B1F; Concourse	Lobby	Ticket Machines, Customer Service, Station Control Room
B2F; Platforms	Platform	12 towards Songgang (Waterlands Resort South)
B2F; Platforms	Island platform, doors will open on the left
B2F; Platforms	Platform	12 towards Zuopaotai East (Shenzhen World)
B2F; Platforms	Platform	20 towards Convention and Exhibition City (Terminus)
B2F; Platforms	Island platform, doors will open on the left
B2F; Platforms	Platform	20 towards Airport North (Shenzhen World)

== Exits ==
Exit		Destination
Exit A		Exhibition City Road (E), Fengtang Avenue (S)
Exit C	C1	Exhibition City Road (W), Fengtang Avenue (N), North Entrance Hall of Shenzhen World Convention and Exhibition Center (Halls 17/18)
Exit C	C2	Exhibition City Road (W), Fengtang Avenue (N), North Entrance Hall of Shenzhen World Convention and Exhibition Center (Halls 17/18)
Exit D		Exhibition City Road (W), Fengtang Avenue (S), South Entrance Hall of Shenzhen World Exhibition & Convention Center (Halls 1–16)

== Gallery ==
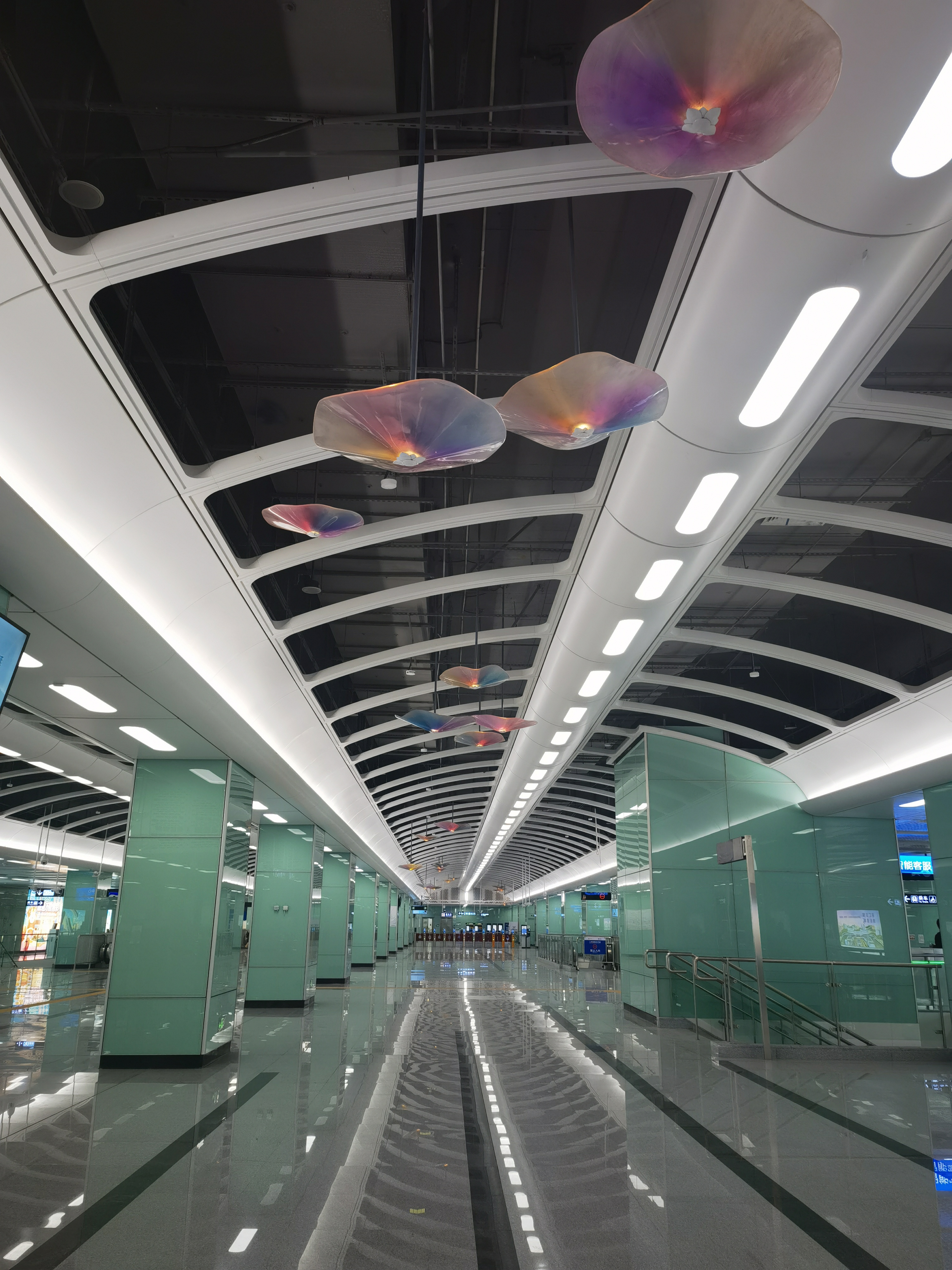
Concourse

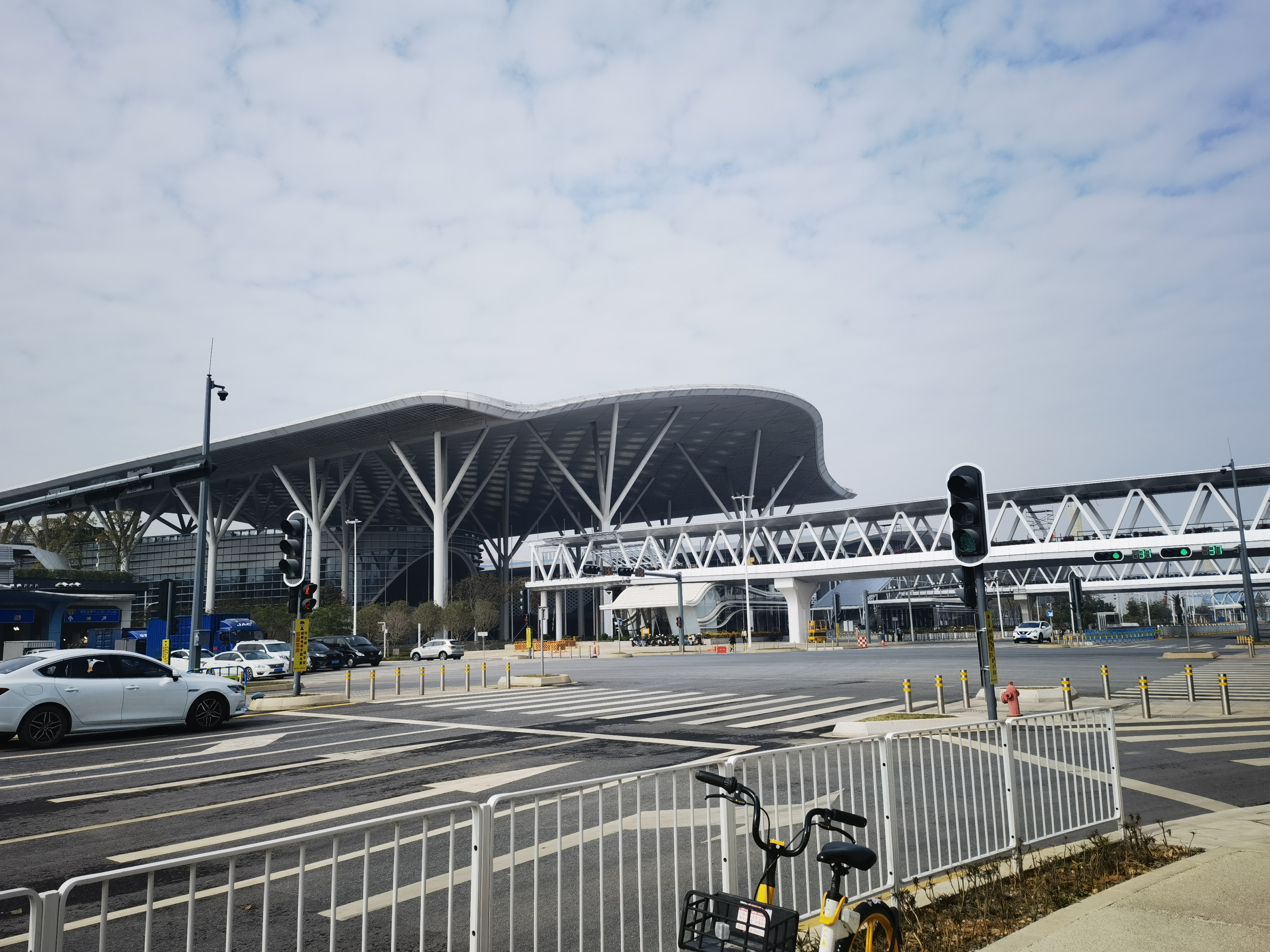
C1 and C2 exits on the east side of the North Entrance Hall of Shenzhen World Exhibition & Convention Center

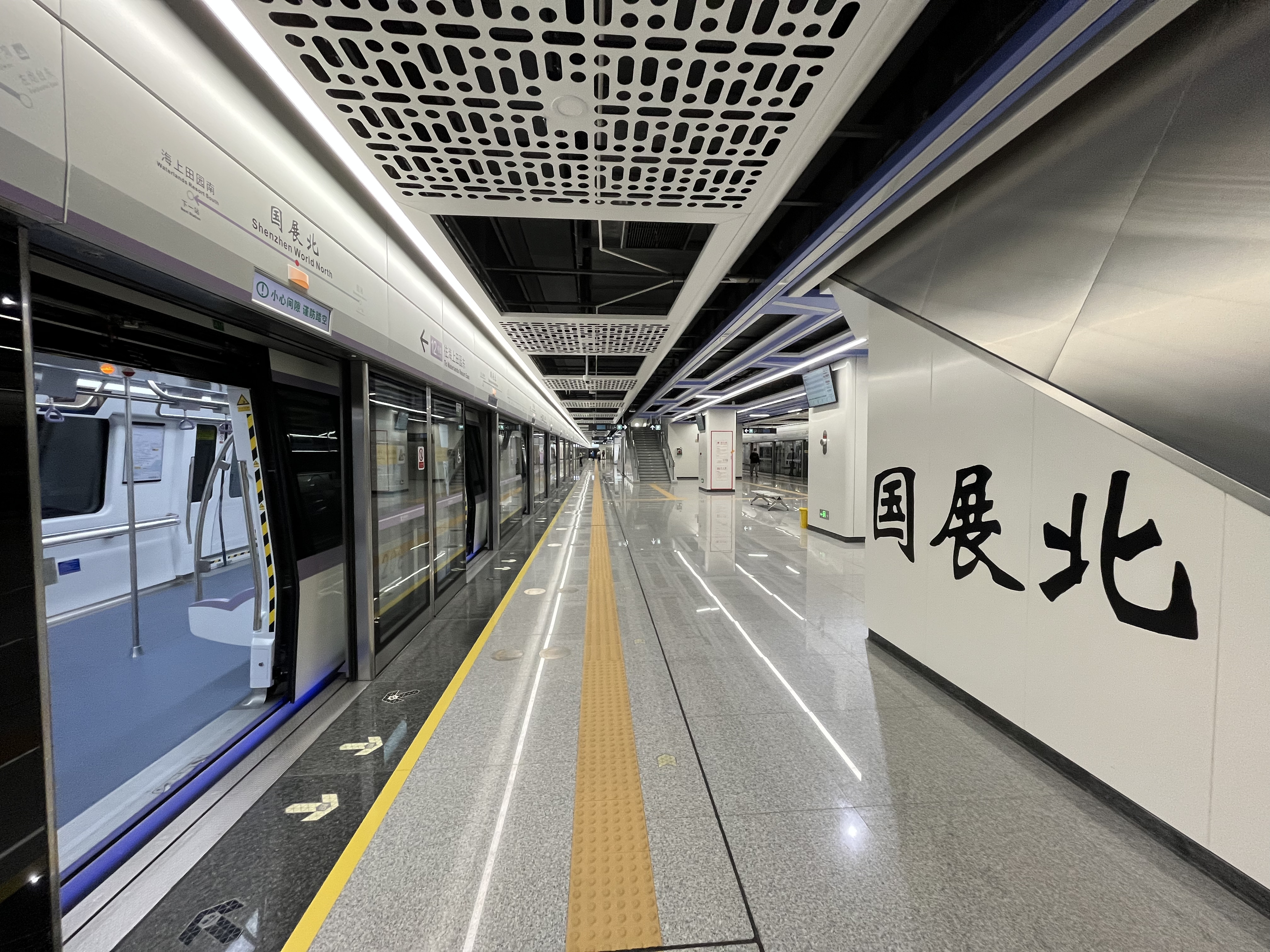
Line 12 platform
