= Line 20 (Shenzhen Metro) =

Metro line in Shenzhen, China

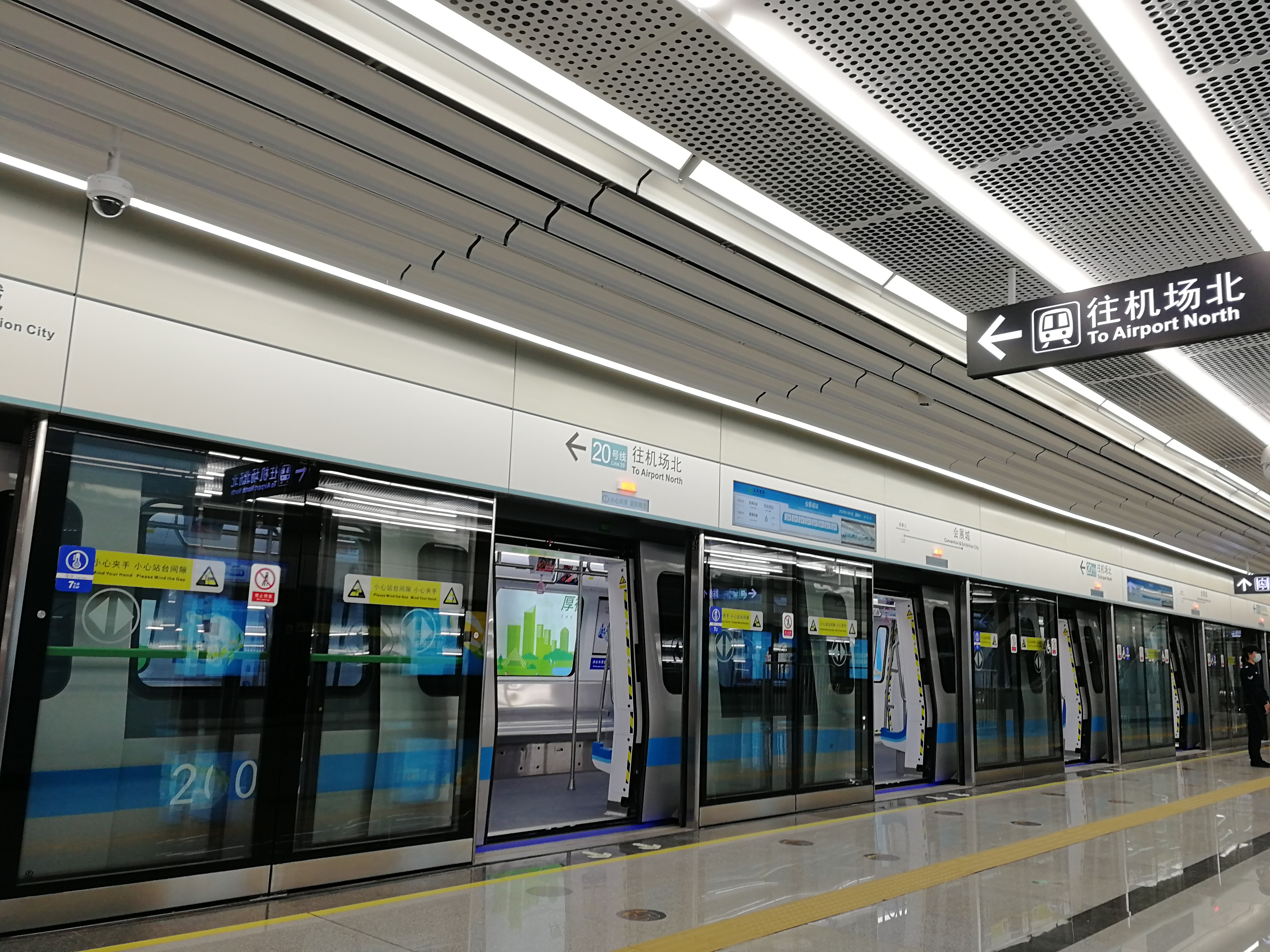

Overview
- Other names: Fuyong line (福永线; 福永線; Fúyǒng xiàn; fuk1 wing5 sin3)
- Native name: 二十号线; 二十號線; Èrshí hào xiàn; ji6 sap6 hou6 sin3
- Status: Operational
- Owner: Shenzhen Metro Group
- Locale: Shenzhen, China
- Termini: Convention & Exhibition City; Airport North
- Stations: 5 (Phase 1)
- Color on map: Cyan (#88dbdf)

Service
- Type: Rapid transit
- System: Shenzhen Metro
- Operator(s): SZMC (Shenzhen Metro Group)
- Rolling stock: CRRC Changchun (2001-2009) (Type A, 8 cars)

History
- Opened: 28 December 2021; 3 years ago

Technical
- Line length: 8.43 km (5.24 mi) (Phase 1)
- Number of tracks: Double-track
- Character: Underground
- Track gauge: 1,435 mm (4 ft 8 1/2 in) standard gauge
- Electrification: 1,500 V DC (overhead lines)
- Operating speed: 120 km/h (74.56 mph)

Line 20 is a rapid transit line in the Shenzhen Metro system. The line connects Airport North with the Convention & Exhibition City.

Construction started on 24 November 2016. The National Development and Reform Commission approved the project in March 2020. It opened on 28 December 2021, after being delayed since 2018.

== Stations ==
Station name		Connections	Nearby bus stops	Distance km		Location
English	Chinese	Connections	Nearby bus stops	Distance km		Location
Convention & Exhibition City	会展城			0.0	0.0	Bao'an
Shenzhen World North	国展北	12	B892 M515 Peak-time 81（高峰81）	1.6	1.6	Bao'an
Shenzhen World	国展	12	615 B892 M515	0.8	2.4	Bao'an
Shenzhen World South	国展南		M341	1.3	3.7	Bao'an
Airport North	机场北	11 SZX; SBA		4.4	8.1	Bao'an

=== Phase 2 ===
- Phase 2 of Line 20 will add 14 stations from Airport North to Futian Bonded Area South. The line is 24.9 km in length. Construction started on the section between Airport North and Baishizhou on 10 October 2023, and this section is expected to open in 2028. The remaining section between Baishizhou and Futian Convention and Exhibition Centre is still under planning, and the section between Futian Convention and Exhibition Centre and Futian Bonded Area South has not been submitted for approval.

Station name		Connections	Location
English	Chinese	Connections	Location
Airport East	机场东	1 12	Bao'an
Hangcheng Hospital	航城医院		Bao'an
Hangcheng	航城		Bao'an
Xixiang Park	西乡公园	15	Bao'an
Shangchuan 1st Road	上川一路		Bao'an
Xin'an Old Town	新安老城		Bao'an
Zhongshan Park West	中山公园西		Nanshan
Nantou Ancient City	南头古城	12	Nanshan
Shenzhen University	深大	1 13	Nanshan
Hi-Tech Park	高新园	1	Nanshan
Baishizhou	白石洲	1 29	Nanshan
Under Planning (Phase 2 remaining section)
Window of the World	世界之窗	1 2 8	Nanshan
Xiangmihu West	香蜜湖西	14 22	Futian
Futian Convention & Exhibition Center	福田会展		Futian
Huanggang Checkpoint	皇岗口岸	Through border checkpoint to: Northern Link Spur Line Huanggang Port (proposed)	Futian
Futian Checkpoint	福田口岸	4 10 Through border checkpoint to: East Rail line Lok Ma Chau	Futian
Futian Bonded Area South	福保南	22	Futian

== Rolling stock ==
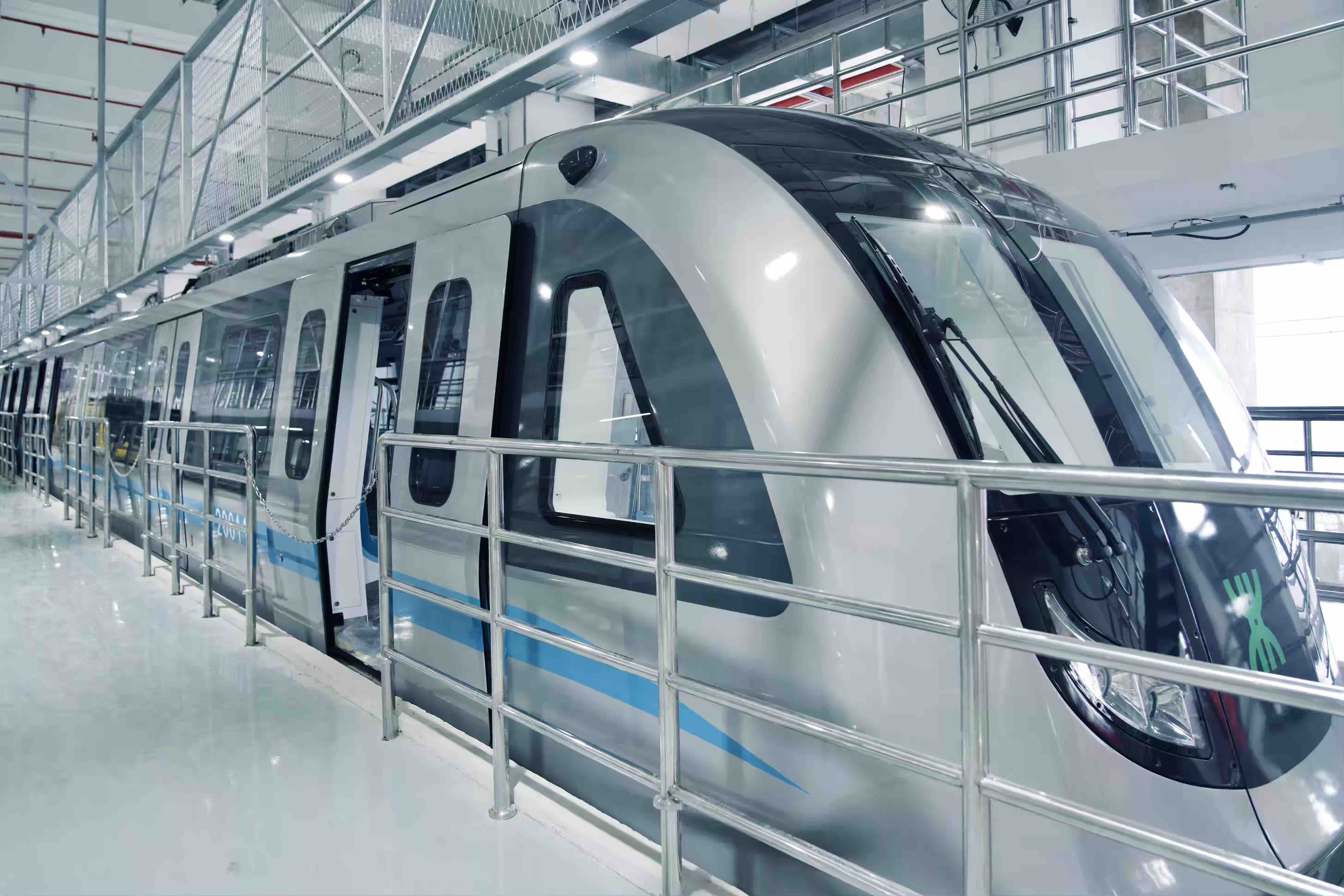
Line 20 train

Line 20 currently uses 9 sets of Size A subway trains in eight car sets (no. 2001–2009) with a maximum speed of 120 km/h (75 mph). It's the first time that Shenzhen Metro use GoA4 automatic train operation. The GoA4 construction standard is applied to Phase I of Shenzhen Metro Line 20, which can fully achieve the automatic operation of unattended trains after opening, and the trains can also automatically sleep, wake up and conduct self inspection. In addition, the train also has more than ten functions, such as train stop control, door platform door alignment isolation, etc.

Type	Date of manufacture	Series	Sets	Serial number	Assembly	Notes
Type A	2020 - 2021	A-size stock	9	2001-2009	Tc+Mp+M+Mp+M+M+Mp+Tc	Manufactured by CRRC Changchun Railway Vehicles
