= Line 18 (Shenzhen Metro) =

Future Shenzhen Metro line

- 18

Overview
- Status: Under planning
- Locale: Shenzhen, Guangdong
- Termini: Shajing (Phase 1) Future: Airport New City; Baihua (Phase 1) Future: Yantian Road
- Stations: 8

Service
- Type: Rapid transit
- System: Shenzhen Metro
- Services: 1
- Operator(s): SZMC (Shenzhen Metro Group)

Technical
- Line length: 18.7 km (11.6 mi) (Phase 1)
- Character: Underground
- Operating speed: 120 km/h (75 mph)

Line 18 of the Shenzhen Metro is an express line under planning, which will connect across Shenzhen for 69.1 kilometers and 29 stations through the districts of Bao'an, Guangming, Guanlan, Pinghu, Longgang and Yantian. The first phase of Line 18 originally entered Phase V planning in September 2022, and will run from Shajing in Bao'an District to Baihua in Guangming District, with 8 stations and 18.7 kilometers of track, however planning has been put on hold since 31 March 2023. The line is proposed to use 6 car type A trains.

== Stations (Phase 1) ==
Station name		Connections	Location
English	Chinese	Connections	Location
Shajing	沙井	11	Bao'an
Shangliao	上寮		Bao'an
Xinqiao	新桥		Bao'an
Genyu Road	根玉路		Guangming
Tianliao	田寮		Guangming
Changzhen	长圳	6	Guangming
Guangmingcheng	光明城	6B 13	Guangming
Baihua	白花		Guangming
