= Convention & Exhibition City station =

Metro station in Shenzhen, China

Convention & Exhibition City 会展城
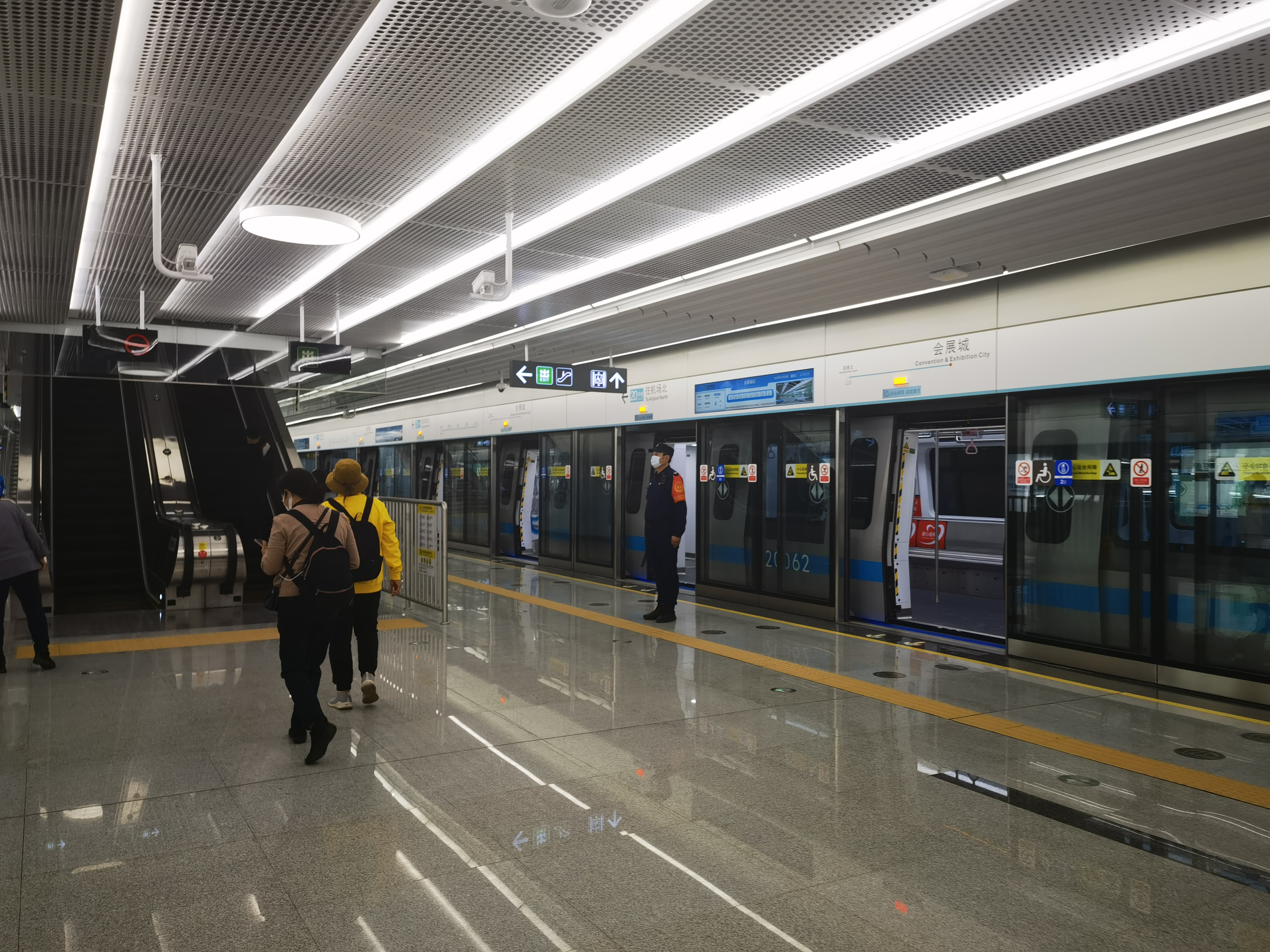
- Platform of Line 20

General information
- Location: Bao'an District, Shenzhen, Guangdong; China
- Operated by: SZMC (Shenzhen Metro Group)
- Line: Line 20
- Platforms: 2 (1 island platform)
- Tracks: 2

Construction
- Structure type: Underground
- Accessible: Yes

History
- Opened: 28 December 2021

Services
Preceding station	Shenzhen Metro	Following station
Terminus	Line 20	Shenzhen World North towards Airport North
Location

Convention & Exhibition City station (simplified Chinese: 会展城站; traditional Chinese: 會展城站; pinyin: Huìzhǎnchéng zhàn) is a station on Line 20 of Shenzhen Metro in Shenzhen, Guangdong, China, which opened on 28 December 2021. It is located in Bao'an District.

== Station layout ==
G	-	Exit
B1F; Concourse	Lobby	Customer Service, Shops, Vending machines, ATMs
B2F; Platforms	Platform	20 reserved platform
B2F; Platforms	Island platform, doors will open on the right
B2F; Platforms	Platform	20 towards Airport North (Shenzhen World North)
