= Airport North station (Shenzhen Metro) =

Metro station in Shenzhen, Guangdong, China

Airport North 机场北
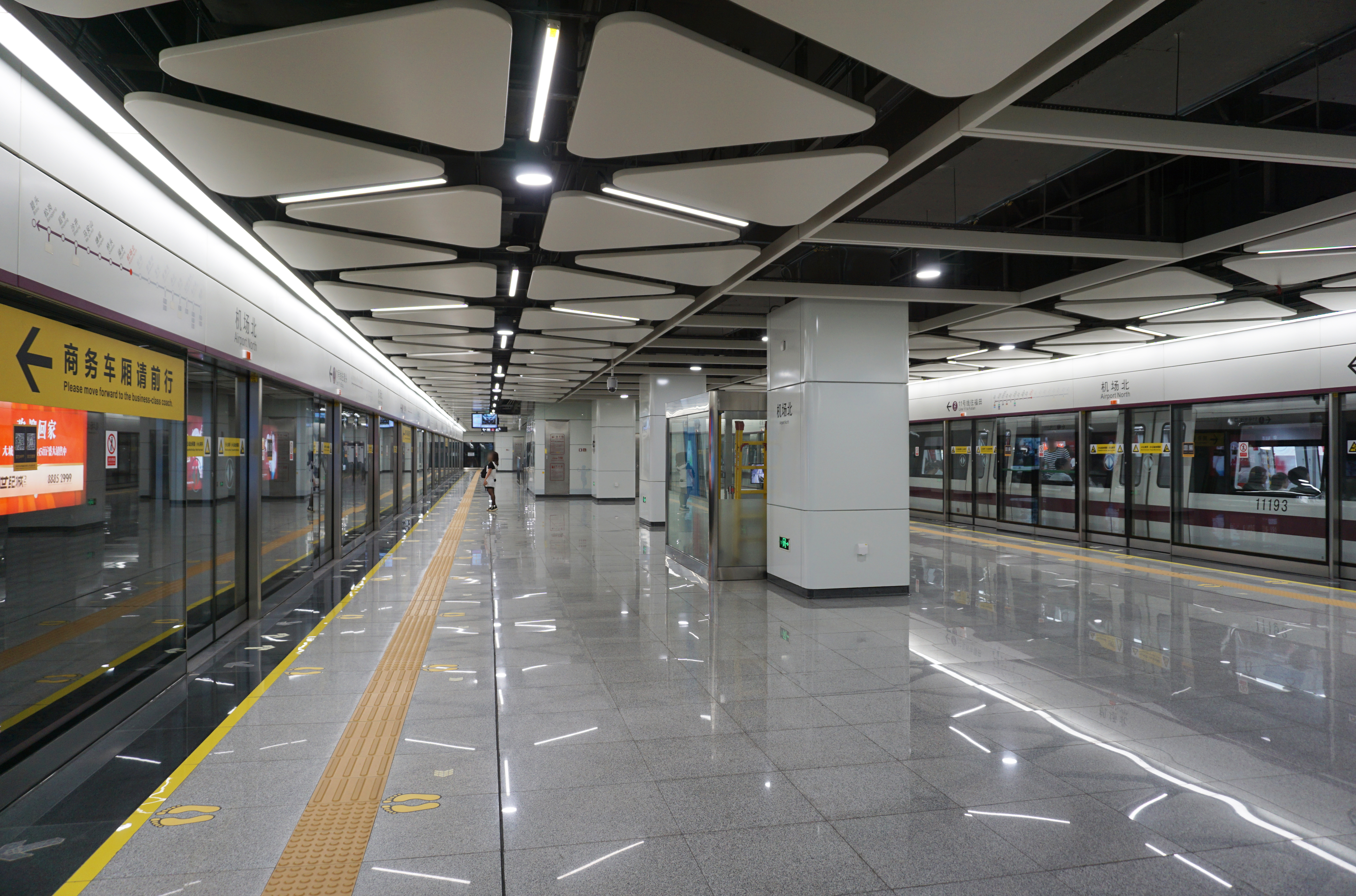

General information
- Location: Shenzhen; Guangdong; China
- Coordinates: 22°39′14″N 113°47′35″E
- Operated by: SZMC (Shenzhen Metro Group)
- Lines: Line 11; Line 20
- Platforms: 4 (2 island platforms)
- Tracks: 4
- Connections: Shenzhen Airport North

Construction
- Structure type: Underground
- Accessible: Yes

History
- Opened: 28 June 2016 (10 years ago) (Line 11); 28 December 2021 (4 years ago) (Line 20)

Services
Preceding station	Shenzhen Metro	Following station
Fuyong towards Bitou	Line 11	Airport towards Hongling South
Shenzhen World South towards Convention & Exhibition City	Line 20	Terminus
Location

Airport North station (simplified Chinese: 机场北站; traditional Chinese: 機場北站; Jyutping: Gei1 Coeng4 Bak1 Zaam6) is a station on Line 11 and Line 20 of the Shenzhen Metro. The station will serve the future Terminal T4 of Shenzhen Bao'an International Airport.

== Station layout ==
G	-	Exits
B1F; Concourse	Lobby	Ticket Machines, Customer Service, Shops, Vending Machines
B2F; Platforms	Platform	20 towards Convention & Exhibition City (Shenzhen World South)
B2F; Platforms	Island platform, doors will open on the right
B2F; Platforms	Platform	20 reserved platform
B2F; Platforms	Platform	11 towards Bitou (Fuyong)
B2F; Platforms	Island platform, doors will open on the left
B2F; Platforms	Platform	11 towards Hongling South (Airport)

== Exits ==
Exit	Destination
Exit A	-
Exit B	-
