= Caopu station =

Metro station in Shenzhen, Guangdong, China

Caopu 草埔
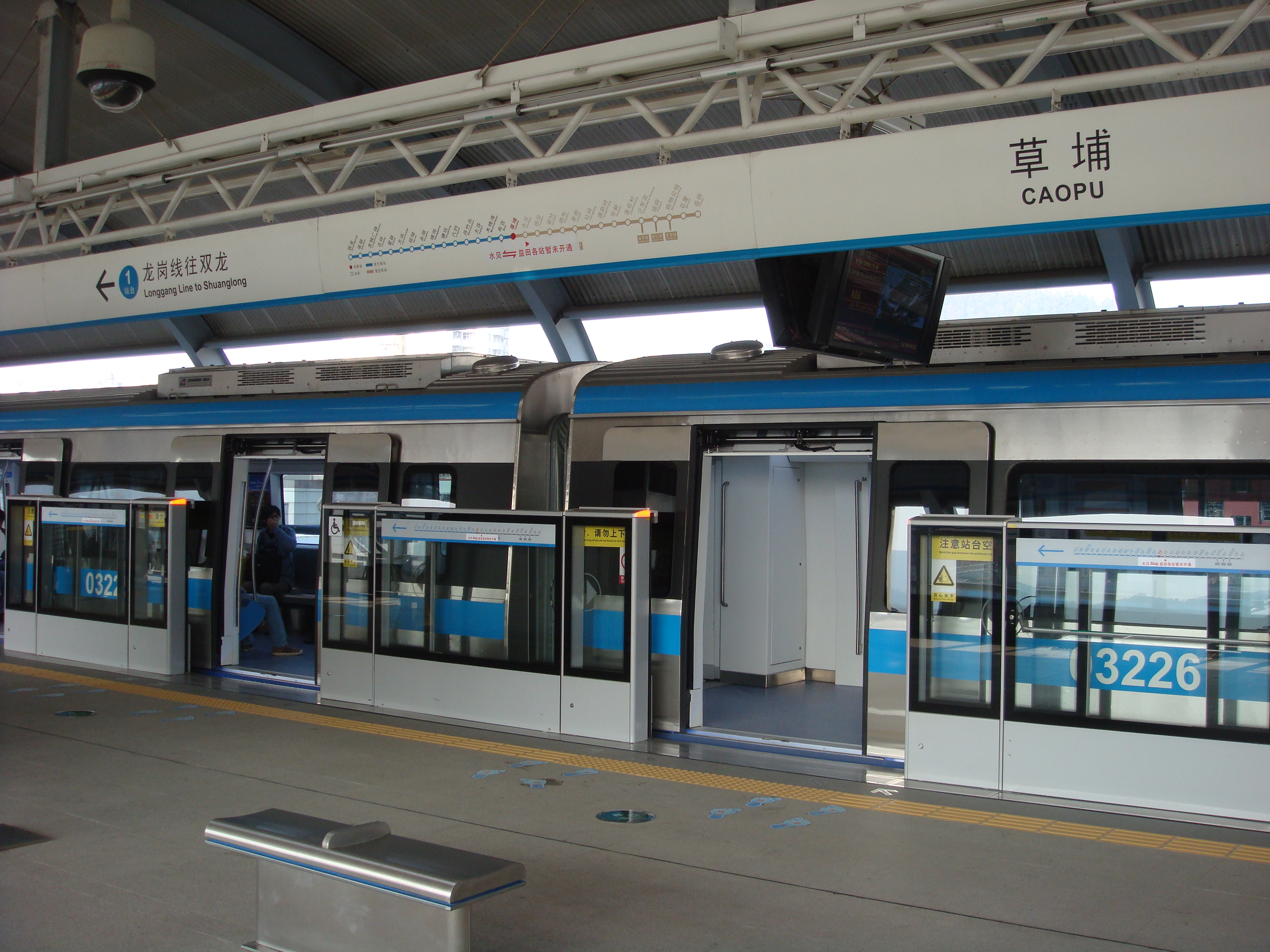
- Platform

General information
- Location: Luohu District, Shenzhen, Guangdong; China
- Coordinates: 22°35′2″N 114°7′2″E
- Operator: Shenzhen Metro Line 3 Operations
- Line: Line 3
- Platforms: 2 (1 island platform)
- Tracks: 2

Construction
- Structure type: Elevated
- Accessible: Yes

History
- Opened: 28 December 2010 (15 years ago)

Services
| Preceding station | Shenzhen Metro | Following station |
|---|---|---|
| Buji towards Pingdi Liulian | Line 3 | Shuibei towards Futian Bonded Area |
Location

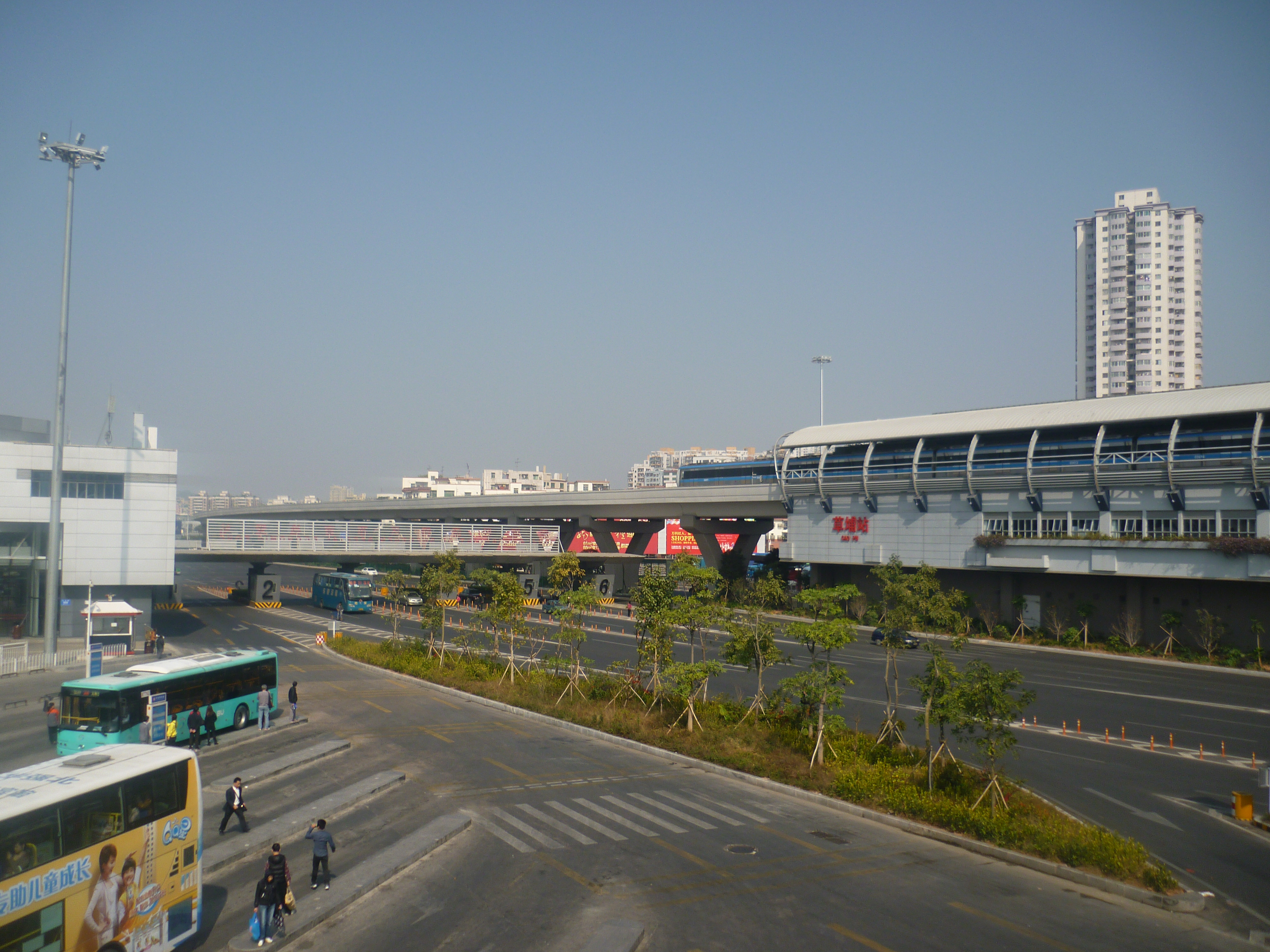
An external view of the station

Caopu station (Chinese: 草埔站; pinyin: Cǎopù Zhàn; Jyutping: cou2 bou3 zaam6) is a station on Line 3 of the Shenzhen Metro. It opened on 28 December 2010. This station served as the terminus of the line until the extension to Yitian on 28 June 2011.

== Station layout ==
| 3F; Platforms | Platform 1 | 3 towards Futian Bonded Area (Shuibei) |
| 3F; Platforms | Island platform, doors will open on the left |
| 3F; Platforms | Platform 2 | 3 towards Pingdi Liulian (Buji) |
| 2F; Concourse | Lobby | Ticket Machines, Customer Service, Shops, Vending Machines |
| G | - | Exits B & D |

== Exits ==
| Exit | Destination |
|---|---|
| Exit B | Shenhui Road (S), Caopu Bus Station |
| Exit D | Shenhui Road (N) |
