= Shuibei station =

Metro station in Shenzhen, Guangdong, China

Shuibei 水贝
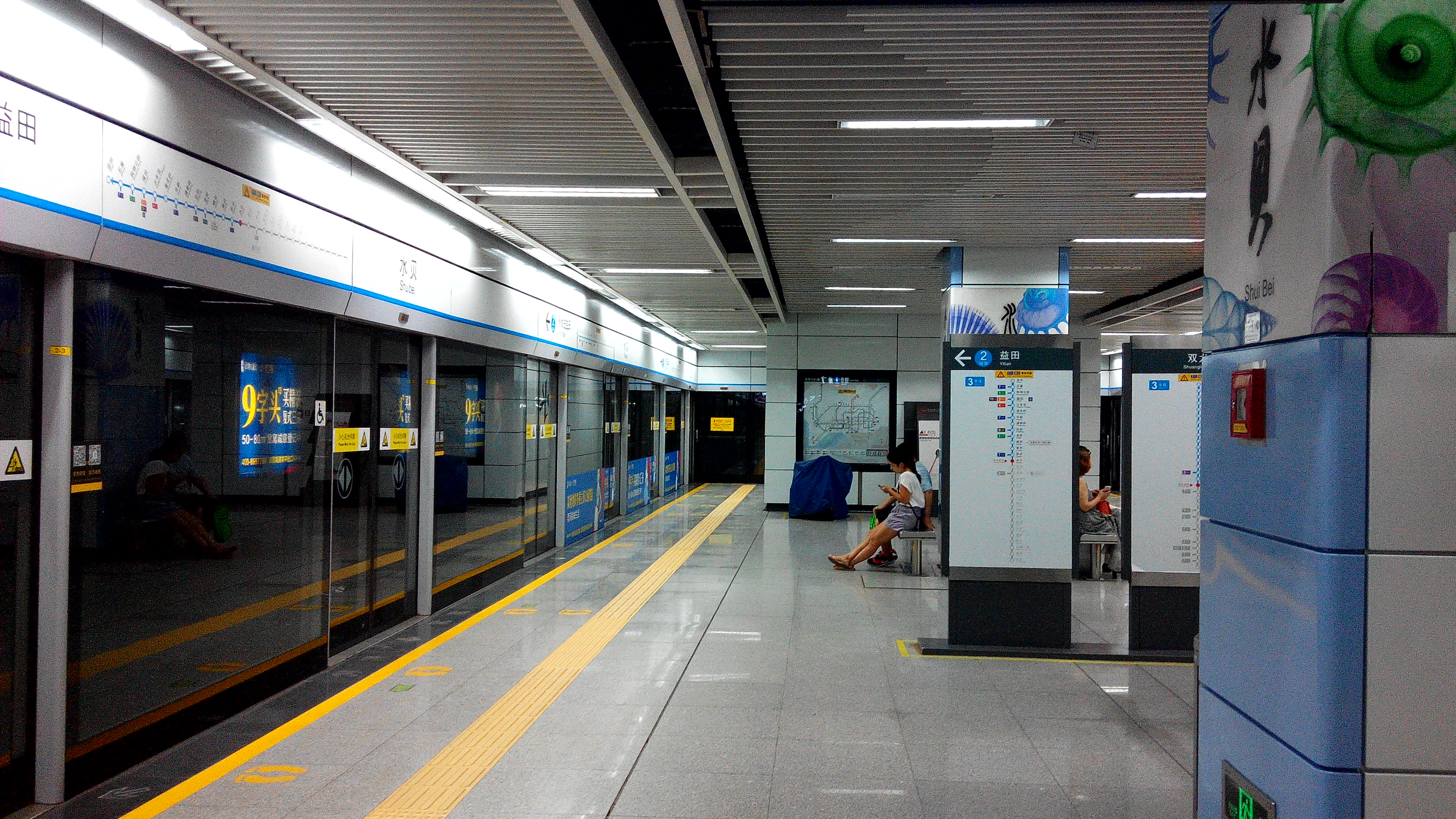
- Platform

General information
- Location: Luohu District, Shenzhen, Guangdong; China
- Coordinates: 22°34′27″N 114°7′35″E
- Operator: Shenzhen Metro Line 3 Operations
- Line: Line 3
- Platforms: 2 (1 island platform)
- Tracks: 2

Construction
- Structure type: Underground
- Accessible: Yes

History
- Opened: 28 June 2011 (15 years ago)

Services
Preceding station	Shenzhen Metro	Following station
Caopu towards Pingdi Liulian	Line 3	Tianbei towards Futian Bonded Area
Location

Shuibei station (simplified Chinese: 水贝站; traditional Chinese: 水貝站; pinyin: Shuìbèi Zhàn; Jyutping: seoi2 bui3 zaam6) is a station of Shenzhen Metro Line 3. It started operations on 28 June 2011, and it is the first station that connected with the old Shenzhen Metro Line 3 which used to terminate at Caopu.

== Station layout ==
G	-	Exits A & B
B1F; Concourse	Lobby	Ticket Machines, Customer Service, Shops, Vending Machines
B2F; Platforms	Platform	3 towards Futian Bonded Area (Tianbei)
B2F; Platforms	Island platform, doors will open on the left
B2F; Platforms	Platform	3 towards Pingdi Liulian (Caopu)

== Exits ==
Exit	Destination
Exit A	Buxin Road (N), Cuizhu Road, Songquan Apartment, Songquan Middle School, Dongchang Primary School
Exit B	Buxin Road (N), Shuibeicun, Beili North Road, Dushucun
