= Yantian Road station =

Metro station in Shenzhen, Guangdong, China

Yantian Road 盐田路
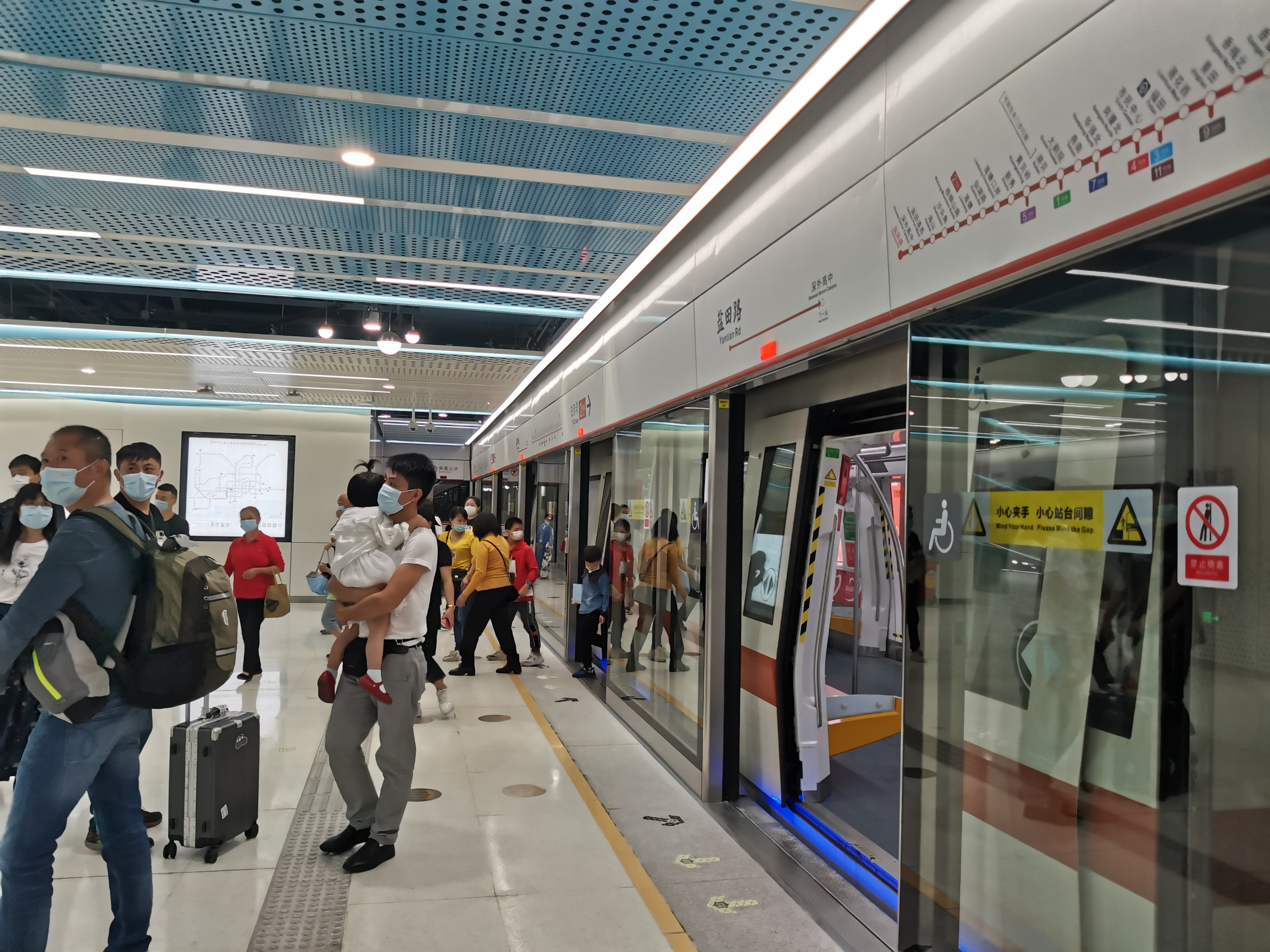
- Platform

Chinese name
- Simplified Chinese: 盐田路站
- Traditional Chinese: 鹽田路站
Transcriptions
Standard Mandarin
- Hanyu Pinyin: Yántián Lù Zhàn

General information
- Location: Yantian Road; Yantian Subdistrict, Yantian District, Shenzhen, Guangdong; China
- Coordinates: 22°35′29.7″N 114°15′2.2″E
- Operator: Shenzhen Metro Group
- Line: Line 8
- Platforms: 3 (1 island platform and 1 side platform)
- Tracks: 3

Construction
- Structure type: Underground
- Accessible: Yes

History
- Opened: 28 October 2020

Services
Preceding station	Shenzhen Metro	Following station
Shenwai Senior Campus towards Liantang (Line 2: Chiwan)	Line 8	Hong'anwei towards Xichong
Location

Yantian Road (Chinese: 盐田路) is a station on Line 8 of the Shenzhen Metro. It opened on 28 October 2020. It was the eastern terminus of the line before the Phase 2 extension to Xiaomeisha opened on 27 December 2023.

== Station layout ==
G	Street level	Exit
B1F; Concourse	Lobby	Customer Service, Shops, Vending machines, ATMs
B2F; Platforms	Platform	← Line 8 towards Chiwan (Shenwai Senior Campus)
B2F; Platforms	Island platform, doors will open on the left, right
B2F; Platforms	Platform	No regular service
B2F; Platforms		Line 8 towards Xichong (Hong'anwei) →
B2F; Platforms	Side platform, doors will open on the right

== Entrances/exits ==
- B: South side of Donghai 4th Street (E), Nanfang Mingzhu Kindergarten
- C: South side of Yantian Rd (E)
- D: East side of Donghai St (S)
- E1: North side of Yantian Rd, Yantian Shuangyong Park
- E2: North side of Yantian Rd
- F: North side of Yantian Rd (E), Shenzhen Yantian District People’s Hospital, Mingzhu Community Park, Lequn Primary School
- G: West side of Yantian Rd (S)
- H: South side of Donghai 4th Street (W), Mingzhu Population Cultural Park, Yantian Population Culture Stage, Yantian Sub-district Office, Yantian Youth Basketball Association, Mingzhu Community Neighborhood Committee
