= Yitian station =

Metro station in Shenzhen, Guangdong, China

Yitian 益田
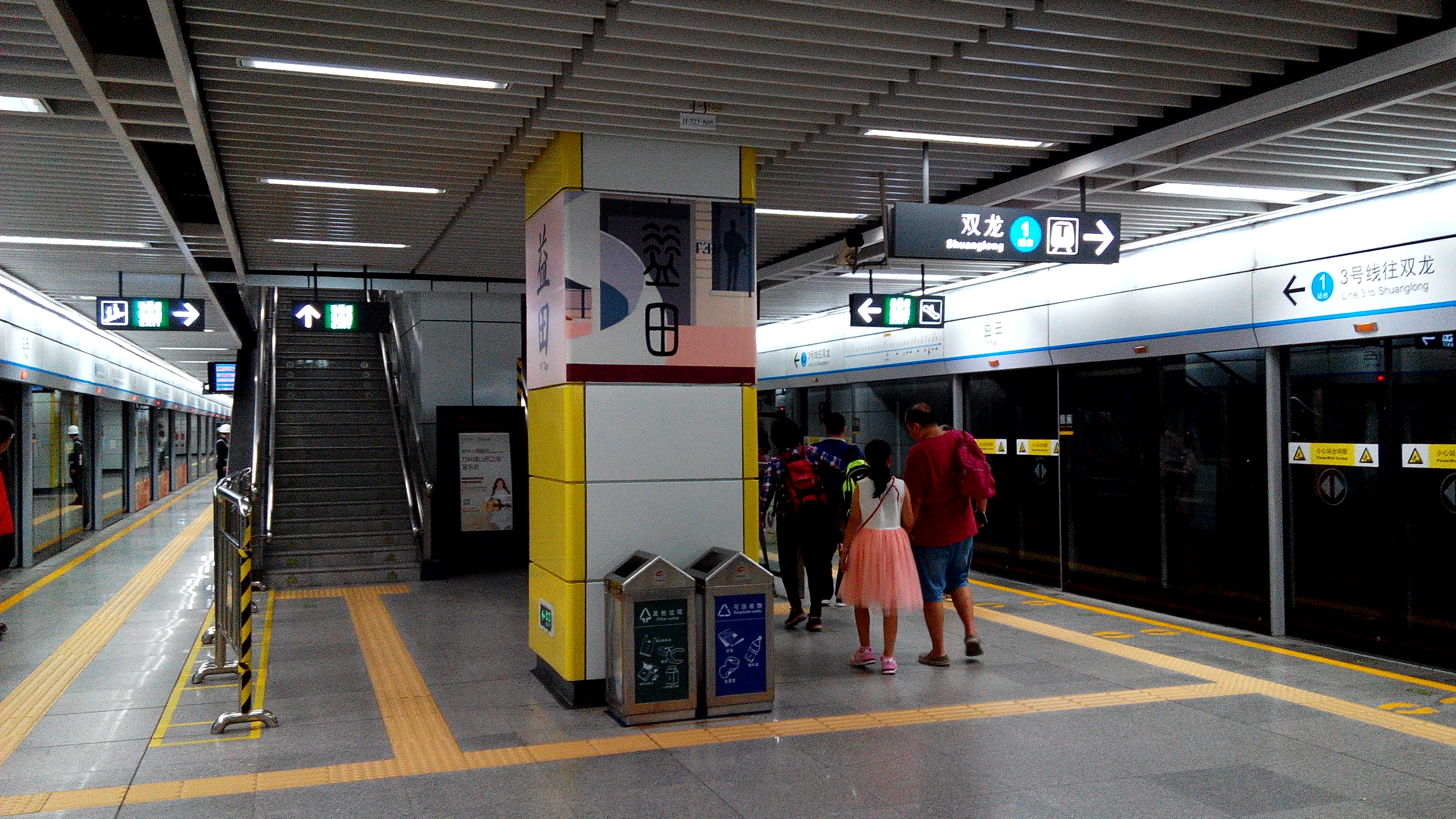
- Platform

General information
- Location: Futian District, Shenzhen, Guangdong; China
- Coordinates: 22°30′59″N 114°3′5″E
- Operated by: SZMC (Shenzhen Metro Group)
- Line: Line 3
- Platforms: 2 (1 island platform)
- Tracks: 2

Construction
- Structure type: Underground
- Accessible: Yes

History
- Opened: 28 June 2011 (14 years ago)

Services
Preceding station	Shenzhen Metro	Following station
Shixia towards Pingdi Liulian	Line 3	Futian Bonded Area Terminus
Track layout
Location

Yitian station (Chinese: 益田站; pinyin: Yìtián Zhàn; Jyutping: jik1 tin4 zaam6) is a station of Shenzhen Metro Line 3. It opened on 28 June 2011. This station served as the southern terminus of the line until the extension to Futian Bonded Area on 28 October 2020.

== Station layout ==
G	-	Exits A-D
B1F; Concourse	Lobby	Ticket Machines, Customer Service, Shops, Vending Machines
B2F; Platforms	Platform	3 towards Futian Bonded Area (terminus)
B2F; Platforms	Island platform, doors will open on the left
B2F; Platforms	Platform	3 towards Pingdi Liulian (Shixia)

== Exits ==
Exit	Destination
Exit A	Fuqiang Road (S), Yitian Road, Yitiancun, Yitian Primary School, Fuqiang Primary School
Exit B	Fuqiang Road (N), Yitian Road, Hongling Middle School (Shixia Junior High School)
Exit C	Fuqiang Road (N), Property Age
Exit D	Fuqiang Road (S), Yitian Road, Yitiancun, Yitian Primary School, Fuqiang Primary School
