= Shenzhen Metro =

Rapid transit system in China

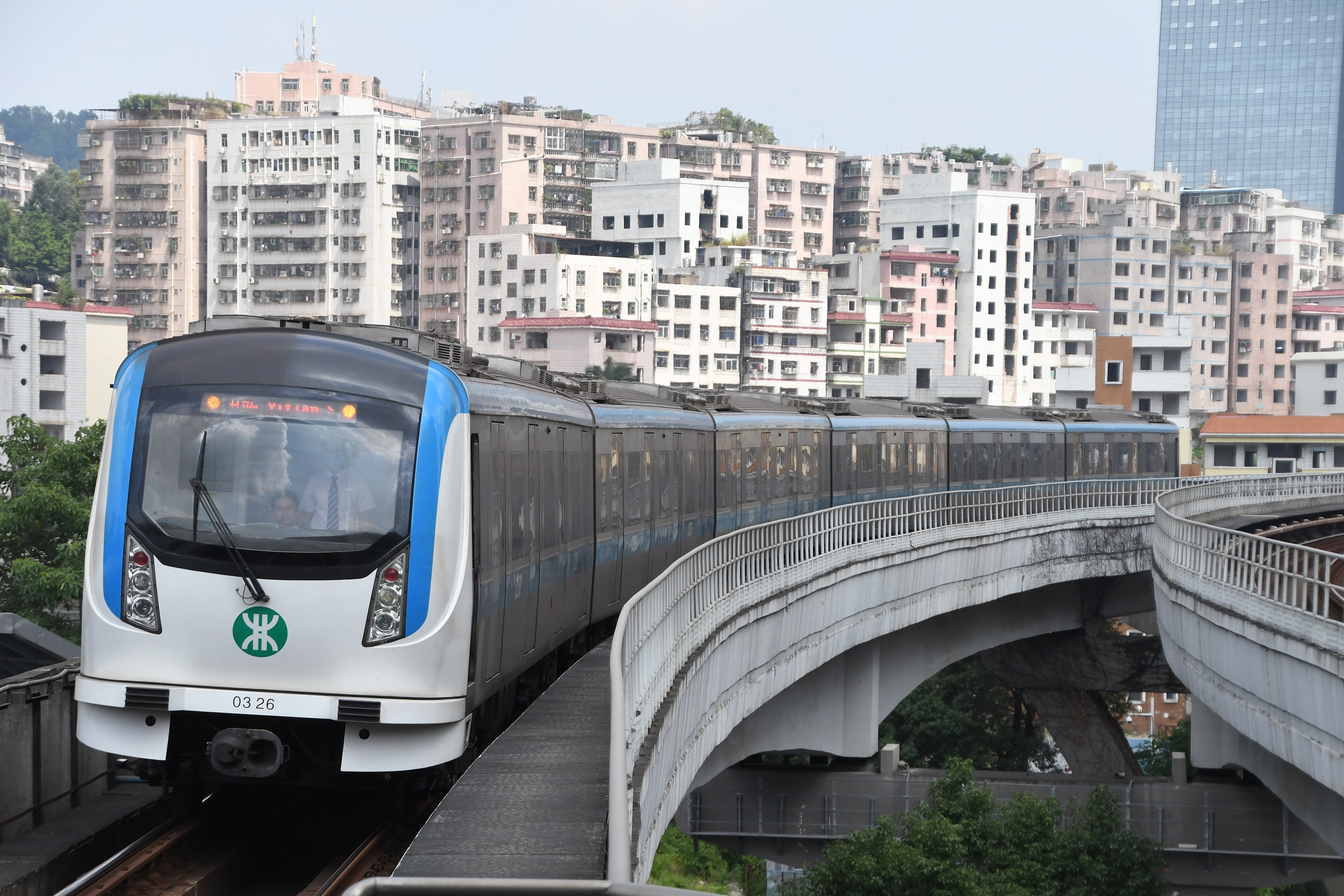

Overview
- Native name: 深圳地铁
- Locale: Shenzhen
- Transit type: Rapid transit
- Number of lines: 17: 1 2 3 4 5 6 6B 7 8 9 10 11 12 13 14 16 20
- Number of stations: 432 (Note: Assuming Liantang station is regarded as an interchange station)
- Daily ridership: 8.46 million (2024); 11.88 million (December 31, 2024, Record)
- Annual ridership: 2.9886 billion (2025)
- Website: Shenzhen Metro Company; MTR Shenzhen

Operation
- Began operation: December 28, 2004; 21 years ago
- Operators: SZMC (Shenzhen Metro Group) (all except lines 4 and 13); MTR Corporation (Shenzhen) (lines 4 and 13 only)

Technical
- System length: 642 km (399 mi)
- Track gauge: 1,435 mm (4 ft 8 1/2 in) standard gauge
- Electrification: Lines 3 and 6 third rail, all other lines 1,500 V DC overhead catenary
- Top speed: 80 km/h (50 mph) (Lines 1, 2, 4, 5, 7, 8, 9, 10, 12, 16); 90 km/h (56 mph) (Line 3); 100 km/h (62 mph) (Line 6, 13); 120 km/h (75 mph) (Lines 11, 14, 20, Line 6 Branch)
System map

Shenzhen Metro
- Simplified Chinese: 深圳地铁
- Traditional Chinese: 深圳地鐵
Transcriptions
Standard Mandarin
- Hanyu Pinyin: Shēnzhèn Dìtiě
Yue: Cantonese
- Yale Romanization: Sàmján Dèihtít
- Jyutping: Sam1zan3 Dei6tit3

The Shenzhen Metro (Chinese: 深圳地铁) is the rapid transit system of the city of Shenzhen in Guangdong Province, China. The newest lines and extensions which opened on 28 June 2026 put the network at 642 kilometres (399 miles) (Note: This includes 17.1km of length of the Shenzhen Tram.) of trackage. It currently operates on 17 lines with 421 stations.

Despite having only opened in 2004, the Shenzhen Metro is the 5th longest metro system in the world. Carrying over 3 billion passagers per year, it is the 4th-busiest in the world, with only Beijing, Shanghai and Guangzhou's metros having more rides. By 2035, the network is planned to comprise 8 express and 24 non-express lines totaling 1,142 kilometres (710 miles) of trackage.

== Current system ==
Currently the network has 642 kilometres (399 miles) of route, operating on 17 lines with 432 stations. Line 1, Line 4 and Line 10 run to the border crossings between the Shenzhen Special Economic Zone and the Hong Kong Special Administrative Region at Luohu/Lo Wu and Futian Checkpoint/Lok Ma Chau, where riders can transfer to Hong Kong's MTR East Rail line for travel onwards to Hong Kong.

The current network map

Line	Terminals (District)		Service patterns	Commencement	Latest extension	Length km	Stations	Operator
1	Luohu (Luohu)	Airport East (Bao'an)	Luohu ↔ Airport East Partial: Luohu ↔ Zhuzilin, Zhuzilin ↔ Airport East, Luohu ↔ Qianhaiwan, Luohu ↔ Xixiang	December 28, 2004	June 15, 2011	41.0	30	Shenzhen Metro Group
2	Chiwan (Nanshan)	Liantang (Luohu)	Chiwan ↔ Liantang; Rush Hour: Wanxia ↔ Liantang; Partial: Houhai ↔ Liantang	December 28, 2010	October 28, 2020	39.78	32	Shenzhen Metro Group
3	Futian Bonded Area (Futian)	Pingdi Liulian (Longgang)	Futian Bonded Area ↔ Pingdi Liulian; Rush Hour: Huaxin ↔ Tangkeng; Partial: Futian Bonded Area ↔ Tangkeng	December 28, 2010	December 28, 2024	52.33	38	Shenzhen Metro Group
4	Futian Checkpoint (Futian)	Niuhu (Longhua)	Futian Checkpoint ↔ Niuhu; AM Rush Hour: Futian Checkpoint ↔ Xikeng	December 28, 2004	October 28, 2020	31.3	23	MTR Corporation (Shenzhen)
5	Chiwan (Nanshan)	Grand Theater (Luohu)	Chiwan ↔ Grand Theater; Rush Hour: Qianhaiwan ↔ Huangbeiling; Partial: Changlingpi ↔ Chiwan; Changlingpi ↔ Huangbeiling	June 22, 2011	December 28, 2025	50.28	37	Shenzhen Metro Group
6	Science Museum (Futian)	Songgang (Bao'an)	Science Museum ↔ Songgang; Partial: Songgang ↔ Fenghuang Town/Science Museum ↔ Fenghuang Town	August 18, 2020	—	49.39	27	Shenzhen Metro Group
6B	Guangmingcheng (Guangming)	SIAT (Guangming)	Guangmingcheng ↔ SUAT	November 28, 2022	September 28, 2025	11.33	7	Shenzhen Metro Group
7	SZU Lihu Campus (Nanshan)	Tai'an (Luohu)	SZU Lihu Campus ↔ Tai'an; Partial: Antuo Hill ↔ Tai'an/Xili ↔ Tai'an	October 28, 2016	December 28, 2024	32.32	29	Shenzhen Metro Group
8	Liantang (Luohu)	Xichong (Dapeng)	Liantang ↔ Xichong	October 28, 2020	December 28, 2025	24.45	11	Shenzhen Metro Group
9	Qianwan (Nanshan)	Wenjin (Luohu)	Qianwan ↔ Wenjin; Partial: Shenzhen Bay Park ↔ Wenjin	October 28, 2016	December 8, 2019	36.18	32	Shenzhen Metro Group
10	Futian Checkpoint (Futian)	Shuangyong Street (Longgang)	Futian Checkpoint ↔ Shuangyong Street; Partial: Futian Checkpoint → Gankeng	August 18, 2020	—	29.31	24	Shenzhen Metro Group
11	Hongling South (Futian)	Bitou (Bao'an)	Hongling South ↔ Bitou; AM Mon–Fri Peak: Hongling South ↔ Airport North	June 28, 2016	December 28, 2025	57.3	22	Shenzhen Metro Group
12	Zuopaotai East (Nanshan)	Songgang (Bao'an)	Zuopaotai East ↔ Songgang; Partial: Zuopaotai East ↔ Huangtian	November 28, 2022	December 28, 2024	48.59	39	Shenzhen Metro Group
13	Shenzhen Bay Checkpoint (Nanshan)	Lisonglang (Guangming)	Shenzhen Bay Checkpoint ↔ Lisonglang	December 28, 2024	June 28, 2026	41.69	26	MTR CREC Metro (Shenzhen) Company Limited
14	Gangxia North (Futian)	Shatian (Pingshan)	Gangxia North ↔ Shatian	October 28, 2022	—	50.32	18	Shenzhen Metro Group
16	Yuanshan Xikeng (Longgang)	Tianxin (Pingshan)	Yuanshan Xikeng ↔ Tianxin	December 28, 2022	September 28, 2025	38.74	32	Shenzhen Metro Group
20	Airport North (Bao'an)	Convention & Exhibition City (Bao'an)	Airport North ↔ Convention & Exhibition City	December 28, 2021	—	8.43	5	Shenzhen Metro Group
Total						642.02	432	

=== Line 1 ===
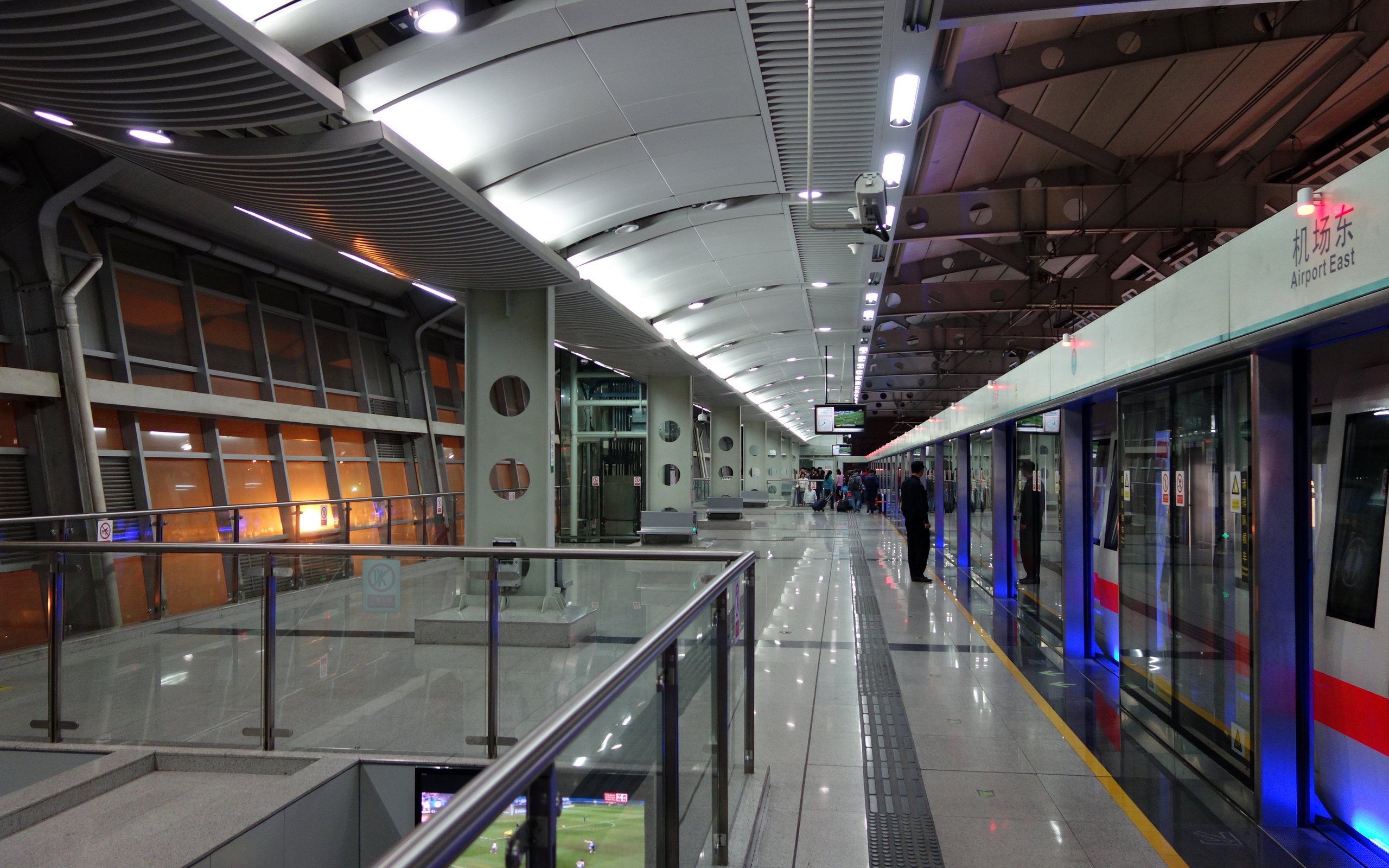
Airport East station of Line 1

Line 1, formerly known as Luobao line, runs westward from Luohu to Airport East. Trains operate every 2 minutes during peak hours and every 4 minutes at other times.

- December 28, 2004: Luohu – Window of the World
- September 28, 2009: Window of the World – Shenzhen University
- June 15, 2011: Shenzhen University – Airport East

=== Line 2 ===
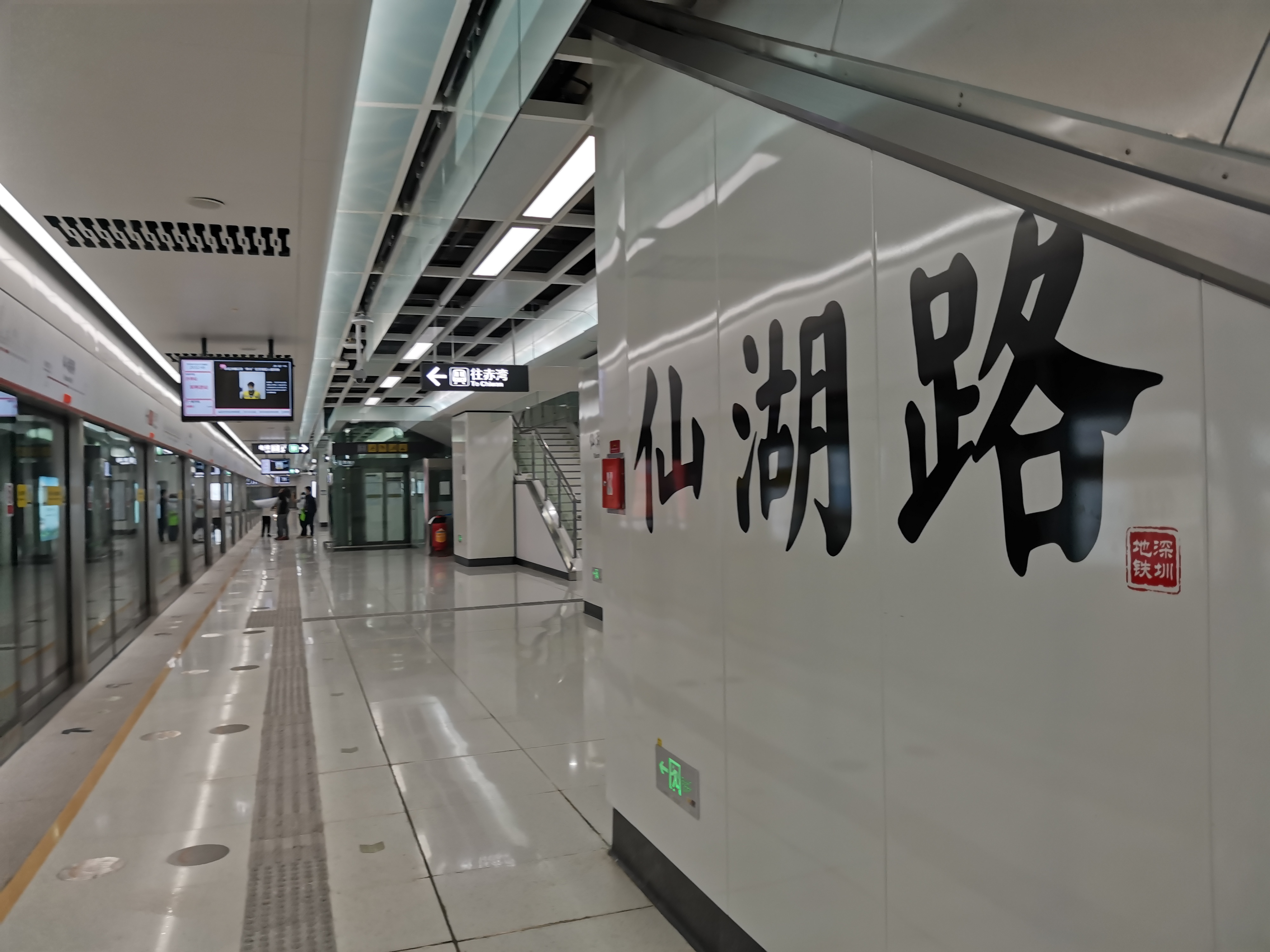
Xianhu Road station of Line 2

Line 2, formerly known as Shekou line, runs from Chiwan to Liantang. Line 2 is connected with Line 8 at Liantang station.

- December 28, 2010: Chiwan – Window of the World
- June 28, 2011: Window of the World – Xinxiu
- October 28, 2020: Xinxiu – Liantang

=== Line 3 ===
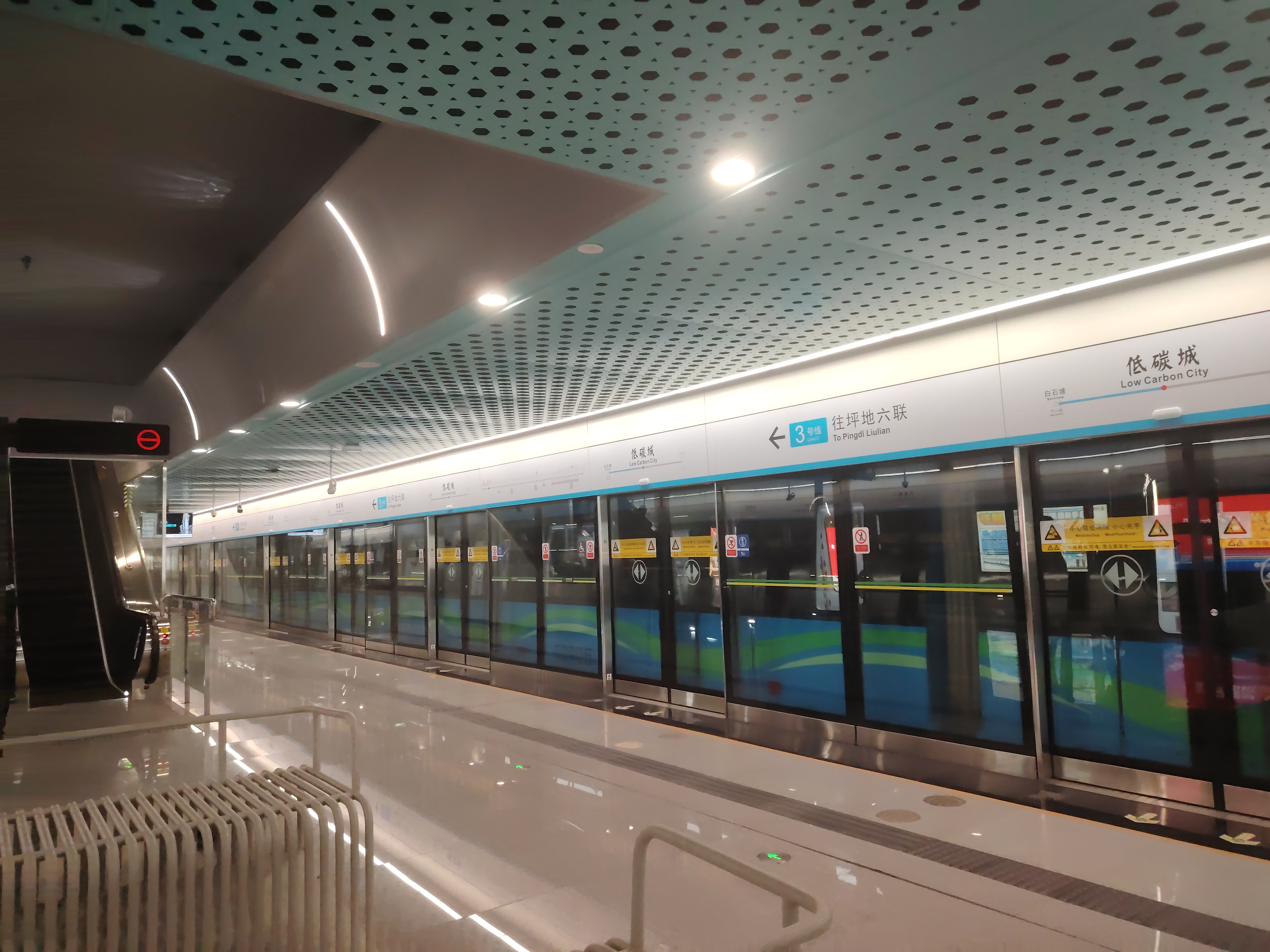
Low Carbon City station of Line 3

Line 3, formerly known as Longgang line, runs from Futian Bonded Area to Pingdi Liulian in Longgang, in the north-east part of the city. Construction began on December 26, 2005. The line is operated by Shenzhen Metro Line 3 Operations, which has been a subsidiary of SZMC (Shenzhen Metro Group) since April 11, 2011, when an 80% stake was transferred to SZMC.

- December 28, 2010: Caopu – Shuanglong
- June 28, 2011: Yitian – Caopu
- October 28, 2020: Futian Bonded Area – Yitian
- December 28, 2024: Shuanglong – Pingdi Liulian

=== Line 4 ===
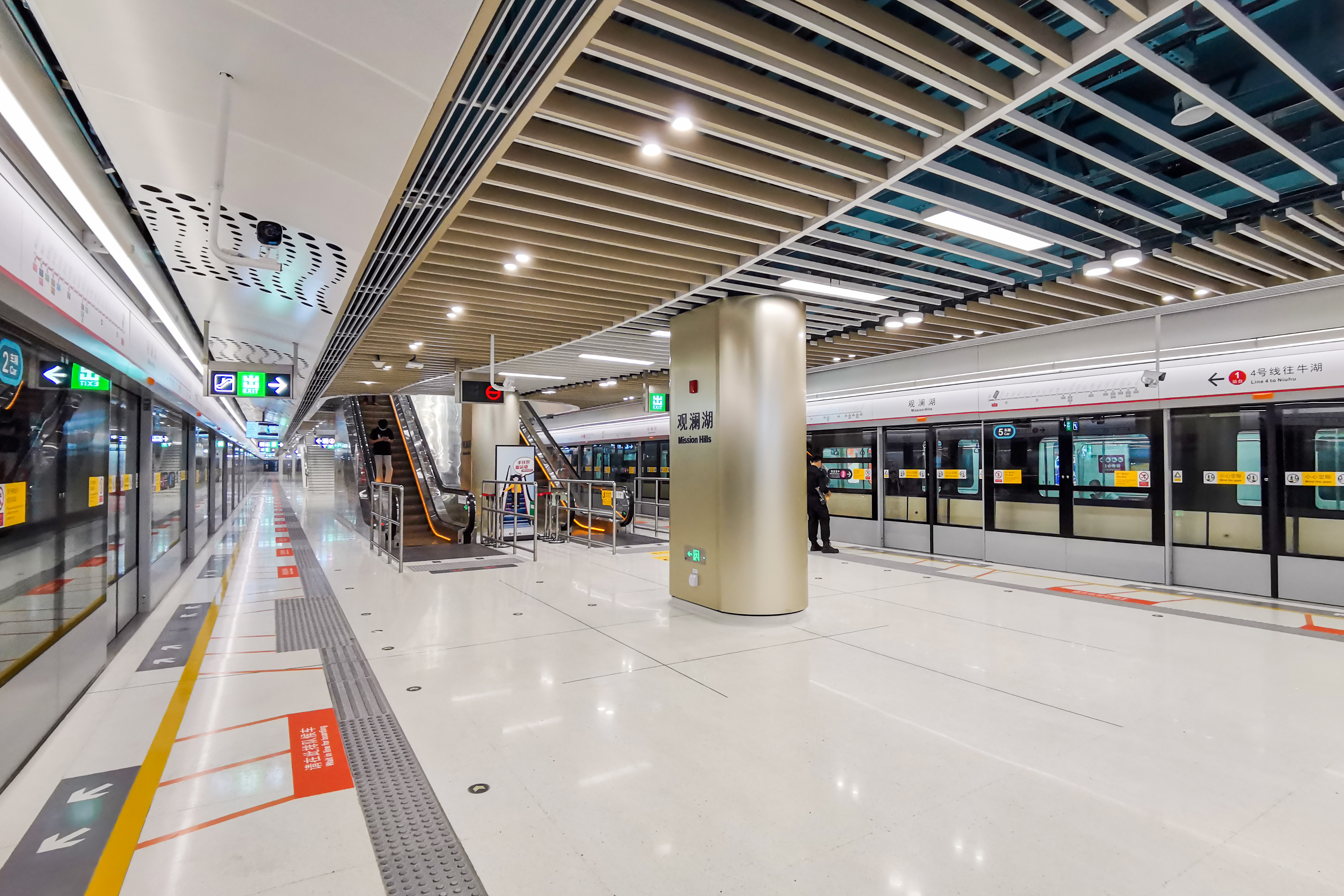
Mission Hills station of Line 4

Line 4, formerly known as Longhua line, runs northward from Futian Checkpoint to Niuhu. Trains operate every 2.5 minutes at peak hours and every 6 minutes during off-peak hours. Stations from Futian Checkpoint to Shangmeilin Station are underground. The line has been operated by MTR Corporation (Shenzhen), a subsidiary of MTR Corporation, since July 1, 2010.

- December 28, 2004: Fumin – Children's Palace
- June 28, 2007: Futian Checkpoint – Fumin
- June 16, 2011: Children's Palace – Qinghu
- October 28, 2020: Qinghu – Niuhu

=== Line 5 ===
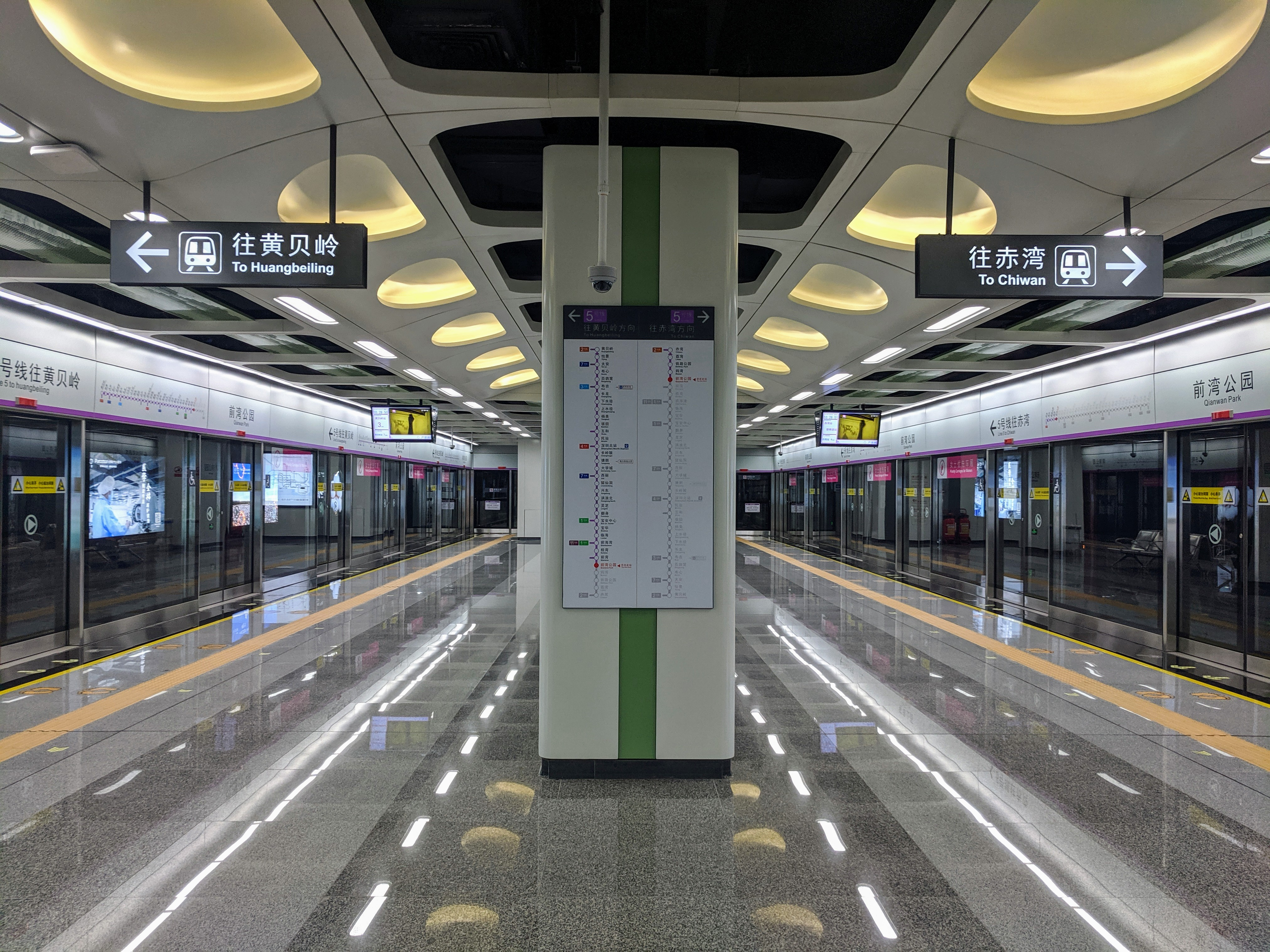
Qianwan Park station of Line 5

Line 5, formerly known as Huanzhong line, runs from Chiwan in the west to Grand Theater in the east via an arch-like shape. Construction began in May 2009 and the line opened on June 22, 2011. Line 5 required a total investment of 20.6 billion RMB. The line is operated by SZMC (Shenzhen Metro Group).

- June 22, 2011: Qianhaiwan – Huangbeiling
- September 28, 2019: Qianhaiwan – Chiwan
- December 28, 2025: Huangbeiling – Grand Theater

=== Line 6 ===
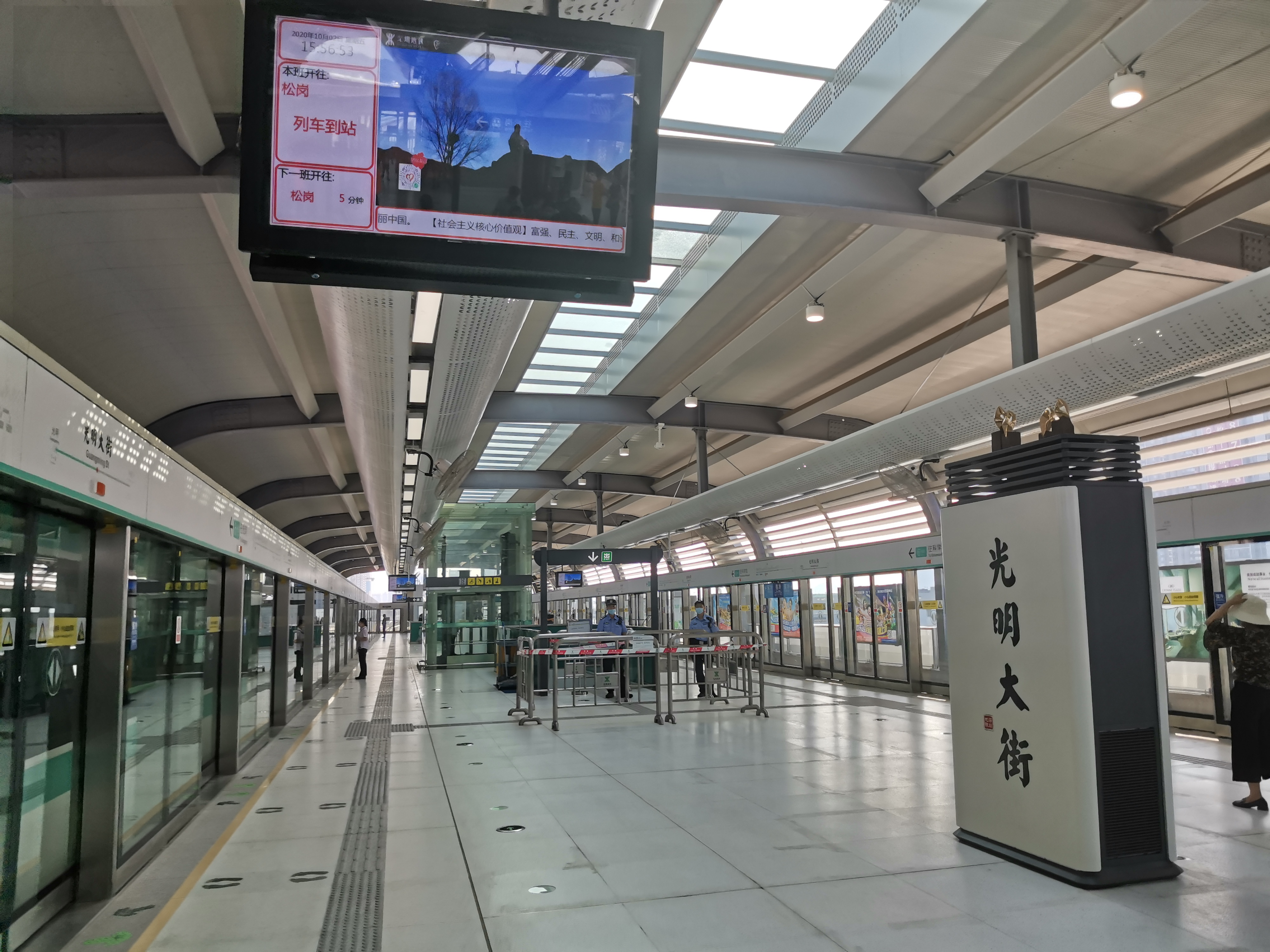
Guangming Street station of Line 6

Line 6, formerly known as Guangming line, runs from Songgang in the north to Science Museum in the south, with a length of 49.4 km (30.7 mi) and a total of 27 stations. Construction began in August 2015 and the line opened on August 18, 2020.

- August 18, 2020: Science Museum – Songgang

=== Line 6 Branch ===
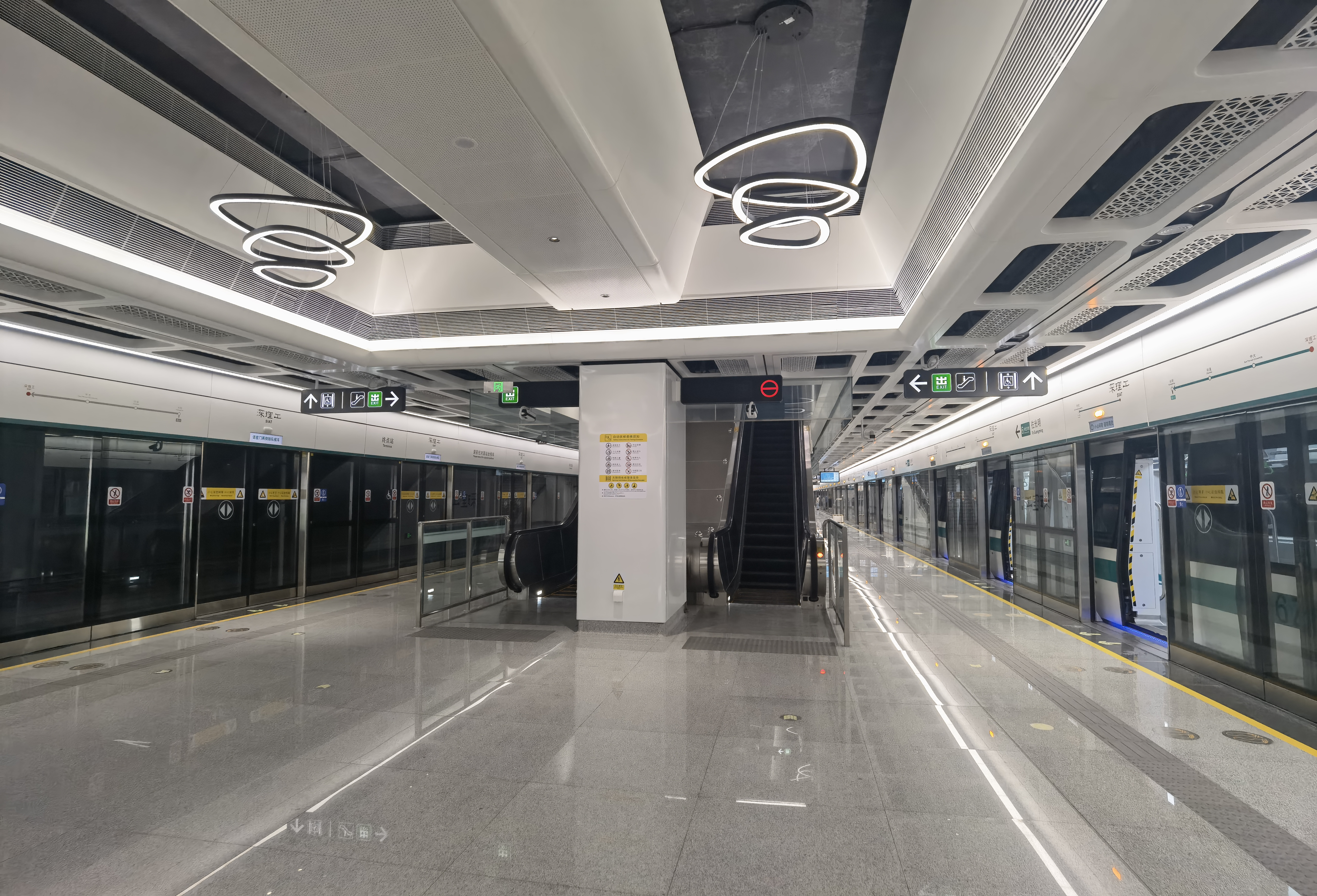
SUAT station of Line 6B

Line 6 Branch, also known as Branch Line 6, runs from Guangmingcheng to SUAT in the north. The line opened on November 28, 2022.

- November 28, 2022: Guangming – SUAT
- September 28, 2025: Guangmingcheng – Guangming

=== Line 7 ===
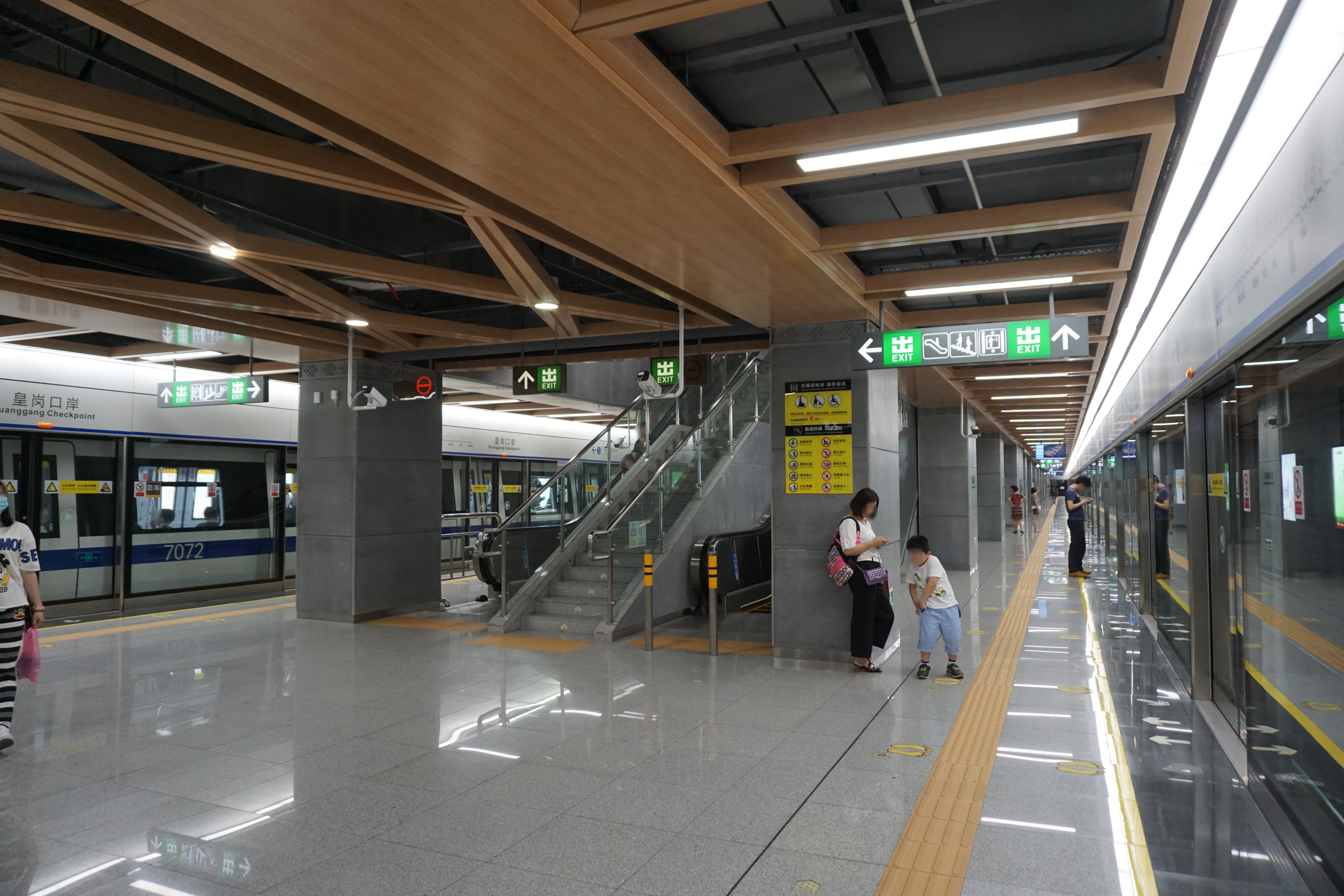
Huanggang Checkpoint station of Line 7

Line 7, formerly known as Xili line of the Shenzhen Metro, opened on October 28, 2016, with a length of 32.84 km (20.41 mi) and a total of 29 stations. It connects SZU Lihu Campus at Shenzhen University to Tai'an. The line travels East–West across Shenzhen in a "V" shape.

- October 28, 2016: Xili Lake – Tai'an
- December 28, 2024: SZU Lihu Campus – Xili Lake

=== Line 8 ===
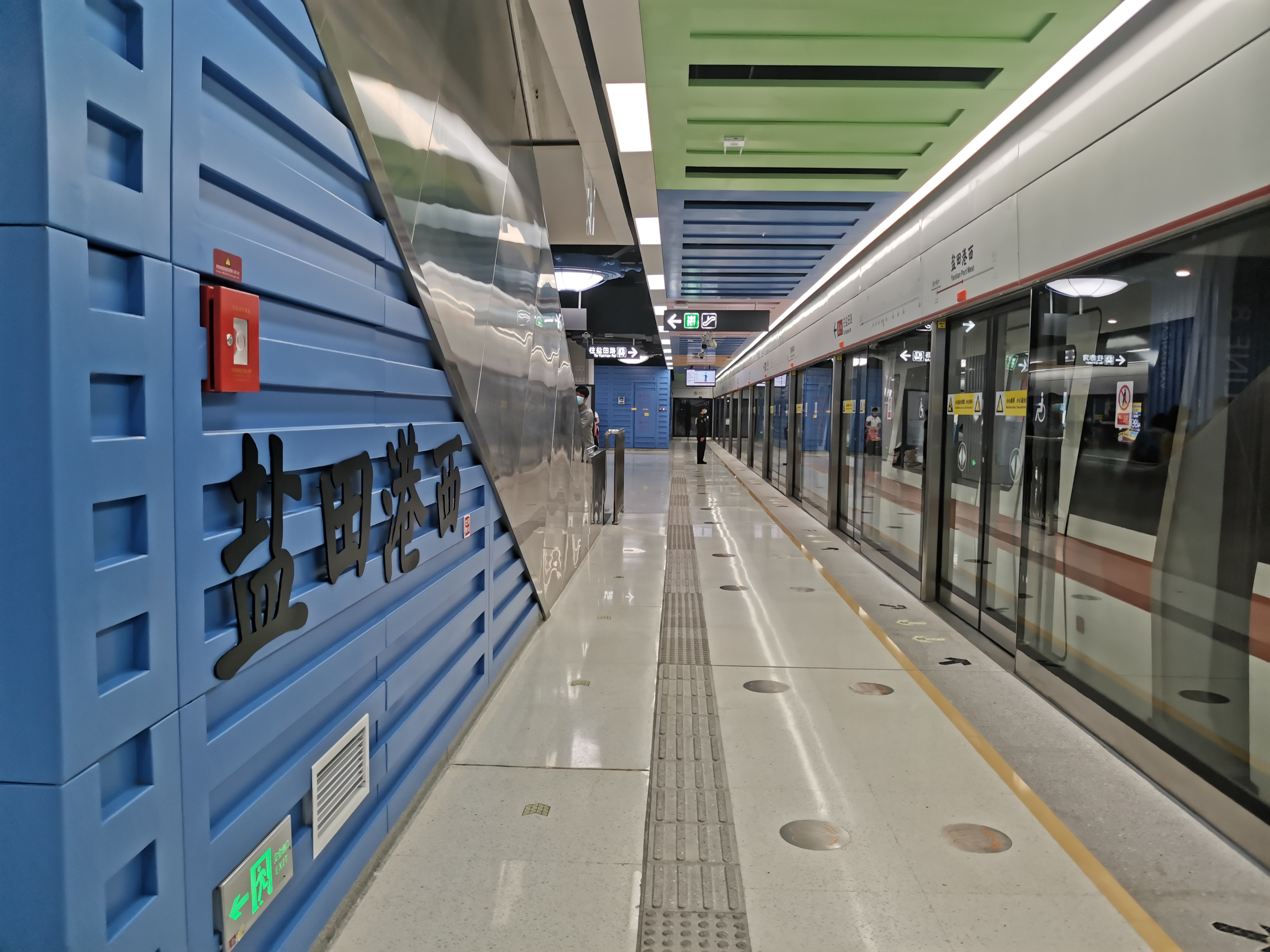
Yantian Port West station of Line 8

Line 8, formerly known as Yantian line of the Shenzhen Metro, opened on October 28, 2020, with a length of 20.377 km (12.662 mi) and a total of 11 stations. It connects the eastern suburbs of Liantang to Yantian Road, then towards the beach resorts at Dameisha, Xiaomeisha before entering Dapeng at the beach resort at Xichong. However, this line serves as the extension of Line 2 in actual operation.

- October 28, 2020: Liantang – Yantian Road
- December 27, 2023: Yantian Road – Xiaomeisha
- December 28, 2025: Xiaomeisha – Xichong

=== Line 9 ===
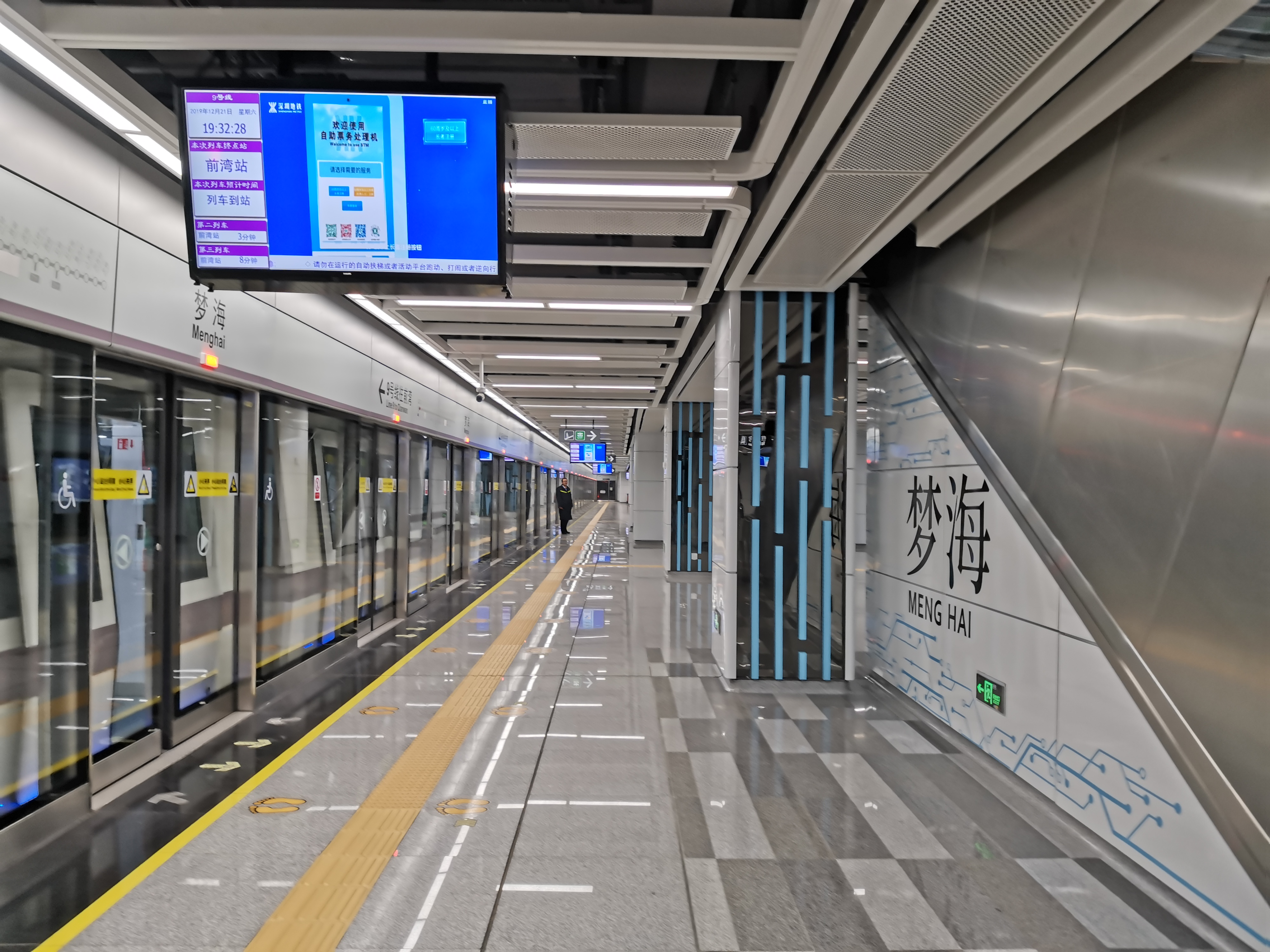
Menghai station of Line 9

Line 9, formerly known as Meilin line or Neihuan line of the Shenzhen Metro, opened on October 28, 2016. The line runs eastward from Qianwan to Wenjin. It has 10 transfer stations. The line is 36.18 km (22.48 mi) long, running through the districts of Nanshan, Futian and Luohu.

- October 28, 2016: Hongshuwan South – Wenjin
- December 8, 2019: Qianwan – Hongshuwan South

=== Line 10 ===
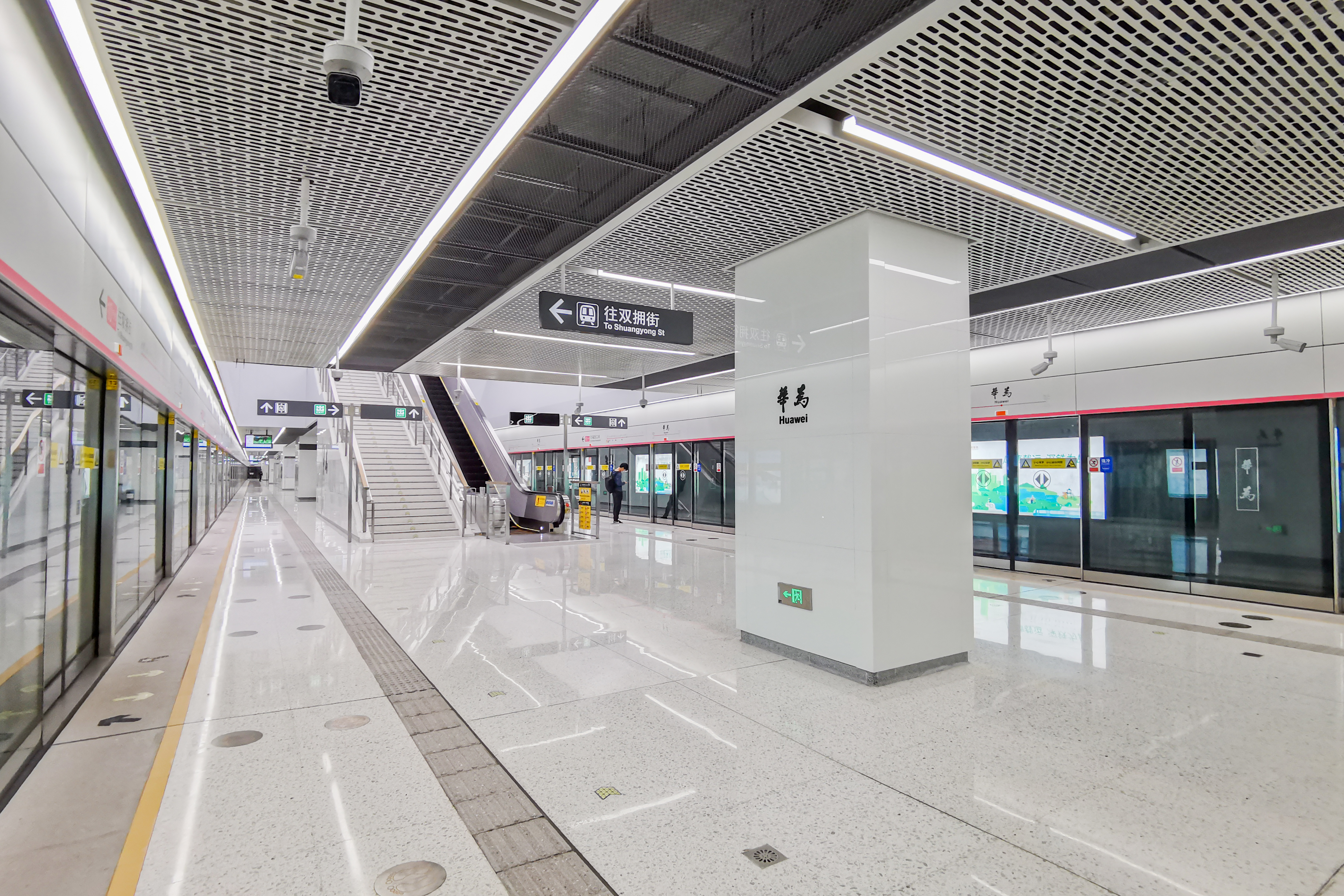
Huawei station of Line 10

Line 10 formerly known as Bantian line, runs from Futian Checkpoint in the south to Shuangyong Street in the north, with a length of 29.3 km (18.2 mi) and a total of 24 stations. Construction began in September 2015 and the line opened on August 18, 2020.

- August 18, 2020: Futian Checkpoint – Shuangyong Street

=== Line 11 ===
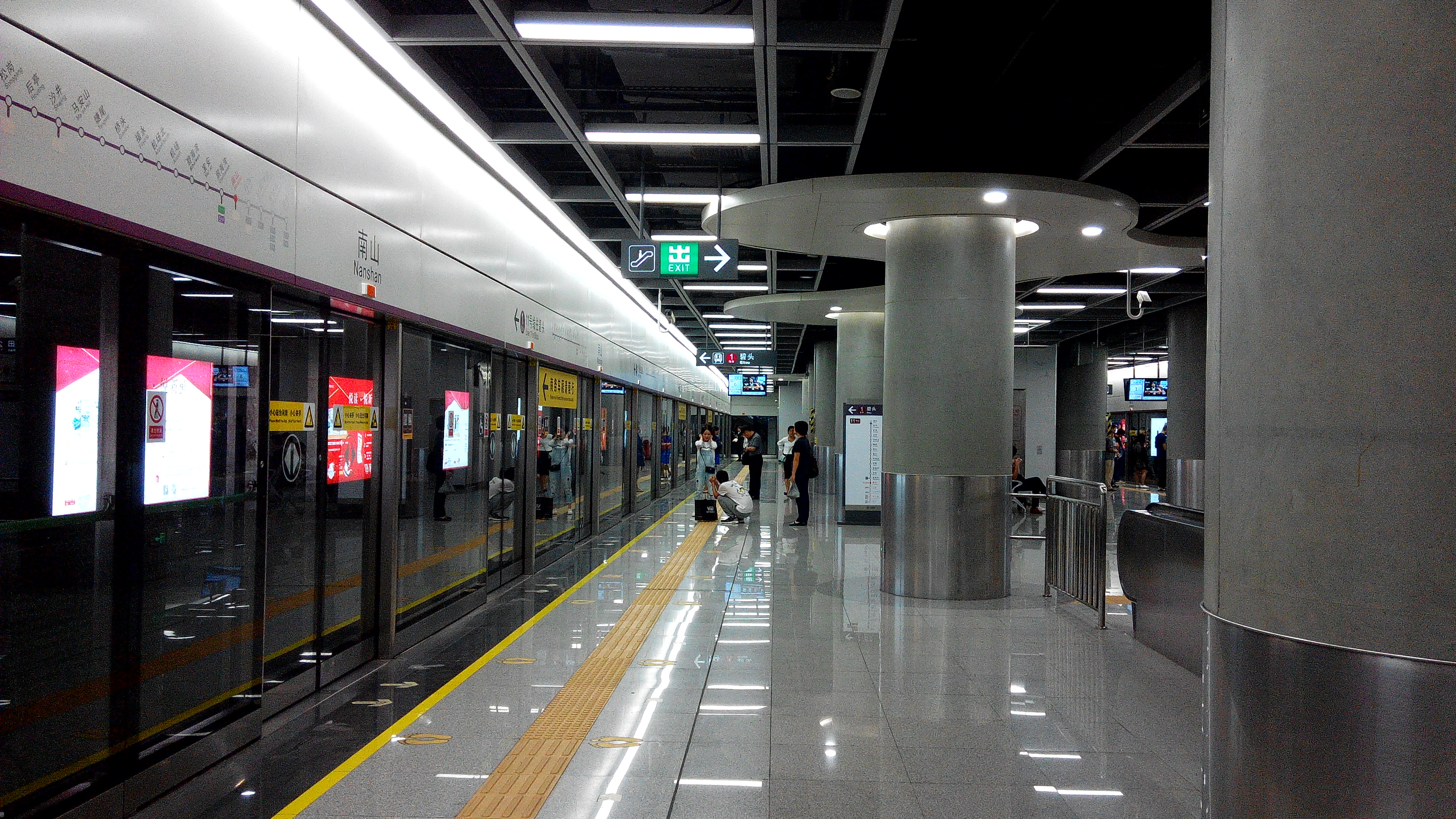
Nanshan station of Line 11

Line 11, also known as the Airport Express, runs from Bitou in the northwest to Hongling South in the city centre via Shenzhen Bao'an International Airport. Construction began in April 2012 and the line opened on June 28, 2016. Line 11 runs at a higher speed of 120 km/h (75 mph).

- June 28, 2016: Bitou – Futian
- October 28, 2022: Futian – Gangxia North
- December 28, 2024: Gangxia North – Huaqiang South
- December 28, 2025: Huaqiang South – Hongling South

=== Line 12 ===
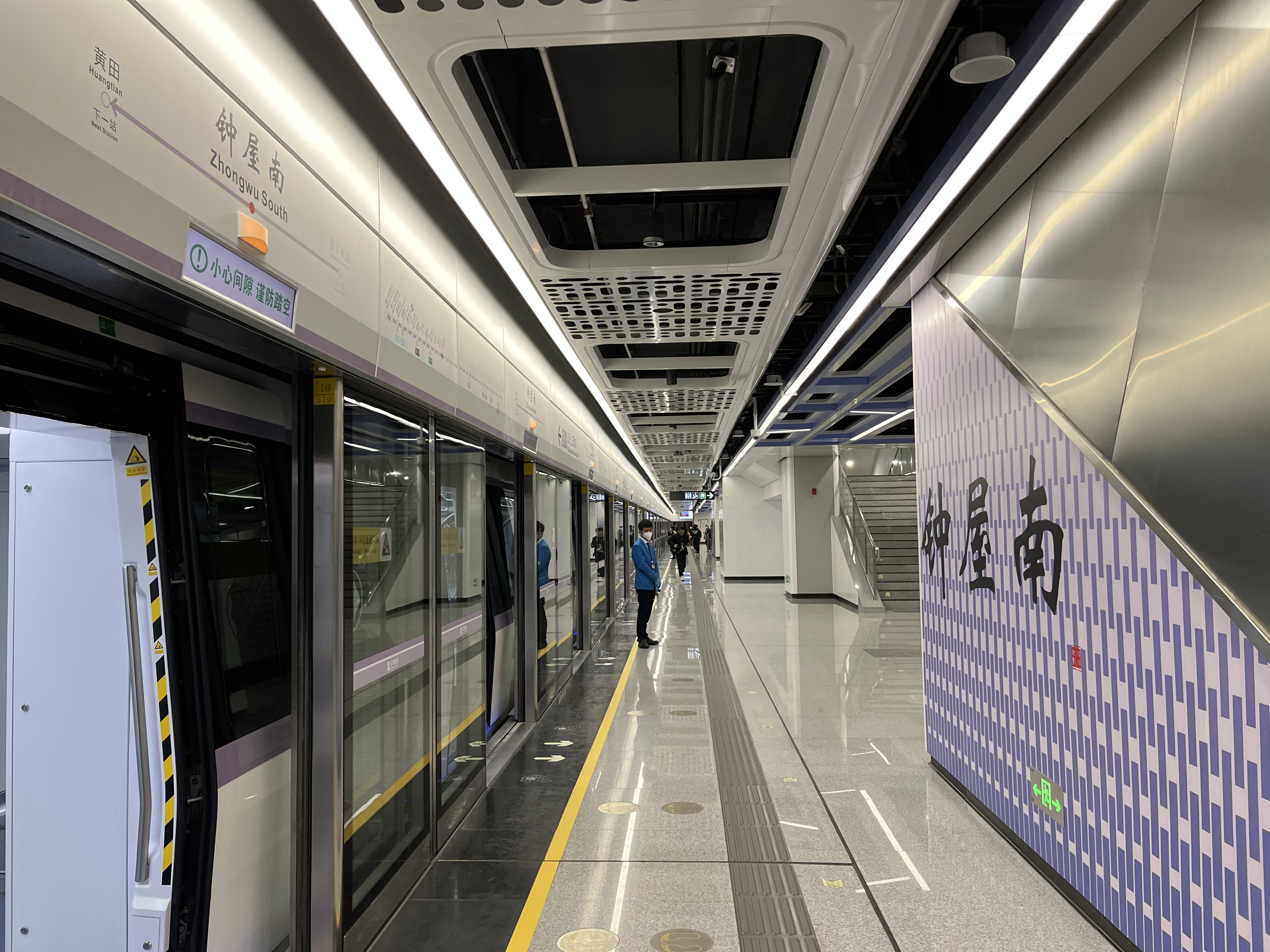
Zhongwu South station of Line 12

Line 12, also known as Nanbao Line, runs from Zuopaotai East in the southwest to Songgang in the northwest. Construction began in 2018 and the line opened on November 28, 2022.

- November 28, 2022: Zuopaotai East – Waterlands Resort East
- December 28, 2024: Waterlands Resort East – Songgang

=== Line 13 ===
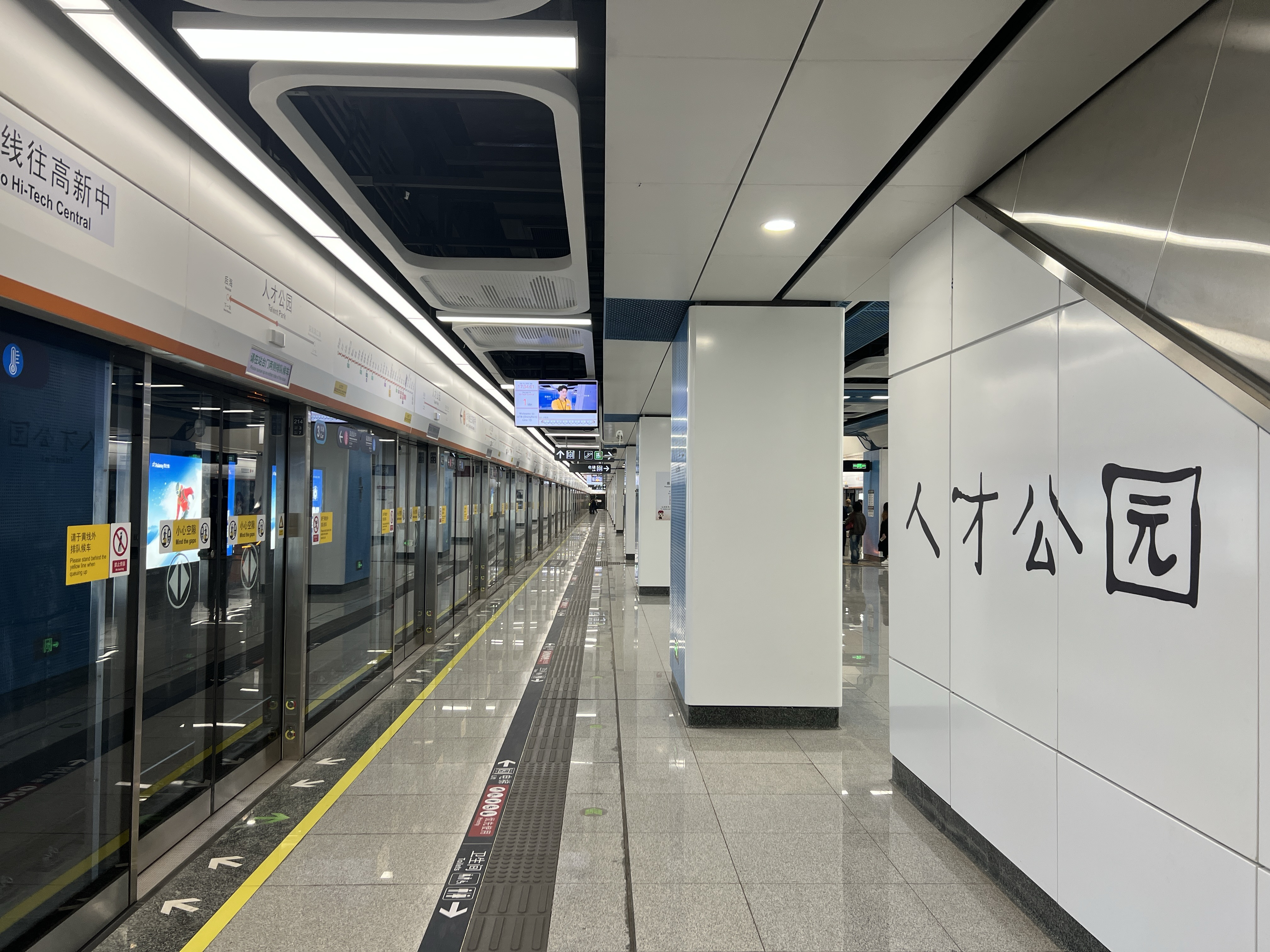
Talent Park station of Line 13

Line 13, also known as Shiyan Line, runs from Shenzhen Bay Checkpoint at the Shenzhen Bay Port in Nanshan to Lisonglang in northeast Guangming. Construction began in 2018 and the first phase of the line between Shenzhen Bay Checkpoint and Hi-Tech Central opened on December 28, 2024. Like Line 4, Line 13 is operated by MTR Corporation (Shenzhen).

- December 28, 2024: Shenzhen Bay Checkpoint – Hi-Tech Central
- December 28, 2025: Hi-Tech Central – Shangwu
- June 28, 2026: Shangwu – Lisonglang

=== Line 14 ===
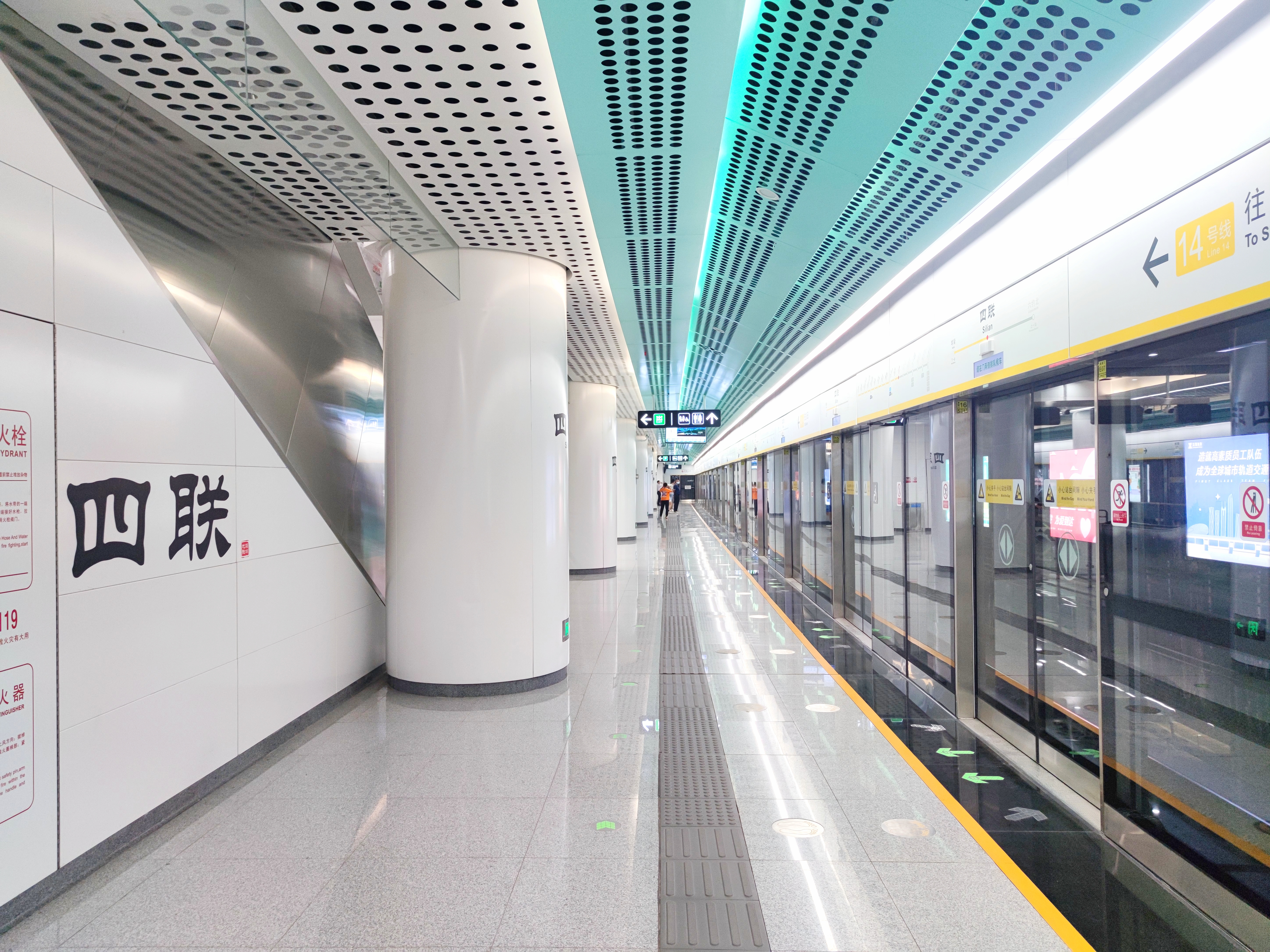
Silian station of Line 14

Line 14, also known as the Eastern Express, runs from Gangxia North in the city centre to Shatian in the northeast. Construction began in 2018 and the line opened on October 28, 2022.

- October 28, 2022: Gangxia North – Shatian

=== Line 16 ===
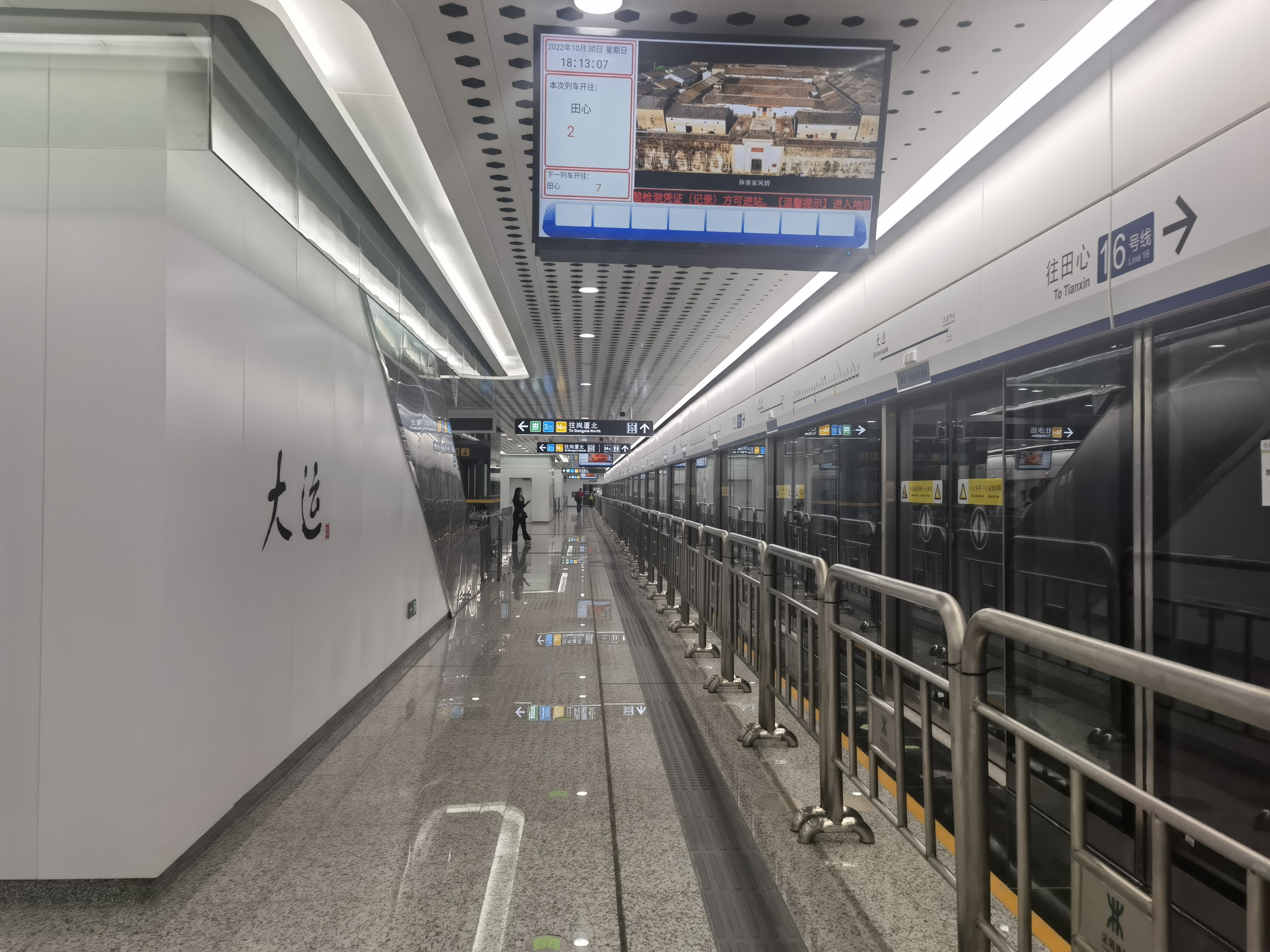
Universiade station of Line 16

Line 16, also known as Longping Line, runs from Yuanshan Xikeng in the south of Longgang to Tianxin in the northeast. Construction began in 2018 and the line opened on December 28, 2022.

- December 28, 2022: Universiade – Tianxin
- September 28, 2025: Yuanshan Xikeng – Universiade

=== Line 20 ===
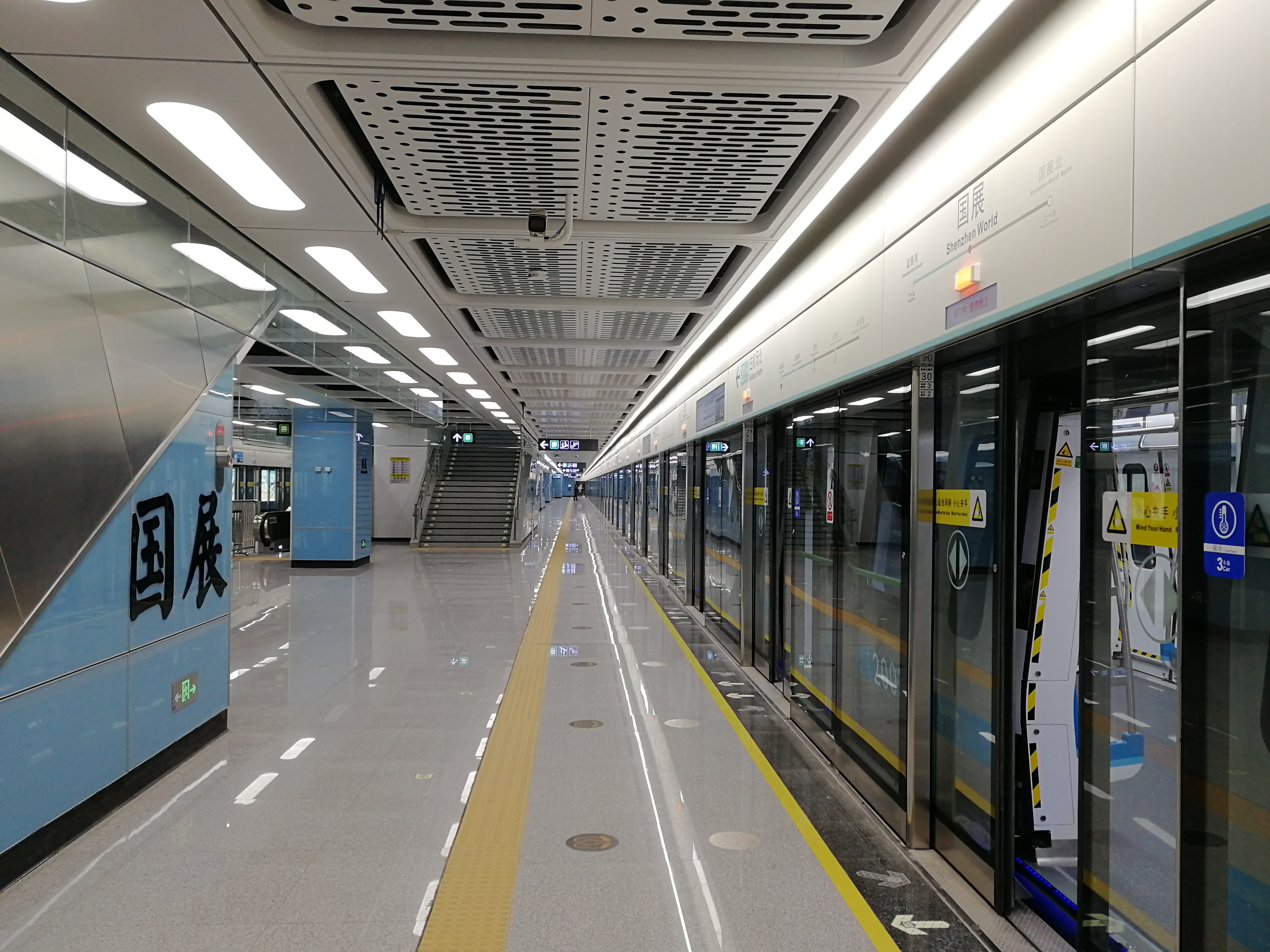
Shenzhen World station of Line 20

Line 20, formerly known as Fuyong line, runs from Airport North in the north-west to Convention & Exhibition City near Shenzhen World. Construction began in September 2016 and the line opened on December 28, 2021. Line 20 runs at the same top speed as line 11, at 120 km/h (75 mph).

- December 28, 2021: Airport North – Convention & Exhibition City

== History ==
Evolution of the Shenzhen metro

=== Early planning ===
In late 1983, Party Secretary of Shenzhen Mayor Liang Xiang led a team to Singapore to study its mass transit system. Upon returning it was decided that 30 metres (98 ft 5 in) on each side of Shennan Avenue should be protected as a green belt, and to set aside a 16-metre (52 ft 6 in) wide median reserved for a light rail or light metro line. In 1984, the "Shenzhen Special Economic Zone Master Plan (1985–2000)" pointed out that, with the growing population and traffic in Shenzhen, a light metro system would not have sufficient capacity to meet future demand. Instead the report proposed a heavy rail subway line to be built along Shennan Avenue. The project was finally approved by the Central Planning Department in 1992.

In August 1992, during and re-feasibility and rail network planning, The Shenzhen Municipal Government decided to move from building a light metro line to a heavy rail subway line. The rapid growth of Shenzhen City made a lower capacity light metro line impractical. In 1994, Shenzhen organized the preparation of the "Shenzhen urban rail network master plan" to be incorporated into the "Shenzhen City Master Plan (1996–2010)". The city's vision for an urban rail network would consists of nine lines. Of the nine transit lines, three of them would be commuter rail lines upgraded from existing national mainline railways. The total length of the proposed network would be about 270 km (170 mi). The three upgraded commuter rail lines would overlap the Guangzhou–Shenzhen railway, Pinghu–Nanshan railway and Pingyan railway. This plan established the basic framework for the Shenzhen Metro network.

=== Construction suspended and restarted ===
In December 1995, the State Council issued the "moratorium on approval of urban rapid transit projects" to suspend approval of rail transit projects in all Chinese cities except Beijing, Shanghai, and Guangzhou. The Shenzhen Metro project was postponed. In 1996, prior to the handover of Hong Kong, authorities attempted to restart construction by renaming the project "The Luohu, Huanggang / Lok Ma Chau border crossing passenger rail connection project", stressing that the project is designed to meet the potential growing demand for cross-border passenger traffic after the handover.

In 1997, Shenzhen reapplied its Subway plans to the State Planning Commission, and received approval in May 1998. The project was renamed the "Shenzhen Metro first phase". In July 1998, SZMC (Shenzhen Metro Group). was formally established. By April 1999, the subway project feasibility study report has been approved by the state.

=== Phase I (1998–2004) ===
Construction of the first sections of Line 1 and Line 4 began in 1999. The grand opening of the Shenzhen Metro system occurred at 5:00 pm on Tuesday, December 28, 2004. This made Shenzhen the seventh city in mainland China to have a subway after Beijing, Tianjin, Shanghai, Guangzhou, Dalian and Wuhan.

Initially the trains operated at 15-minute frequencies and consisted of Line 1 services between Luohu and Shijie Zhi Chuang (now Window of the World) and the Line 4 services between Fumin and Shaonian Gong (now Children's Palace). Initially the English names of the stations were rendered in Hanyu Pinyin, but some of the names were changed to English translation with American spelling like the rest of mainland China, despite being close to the Hong Kong, which uses British spelling and ongoing political tensions with the US, in mid-2011.

The Futian Checkpoint station opened on June 28, 2007, using the name Huanggang.

Date Opened	Line	Termini		Length in km	Stations
December 28, 2004	Line 1 – phase 1	Luohu	Window of the World	17.4	15
December 28, 2004	Line 4 – phase 1 (initial section)	Fumin	Children's Palace	3.0	4
June 28, 2007	Line 4 – phase 1 (extension)	Futian Checkpoint	Fumin	1.0	1

=== Name changes ===
On April 23, 2008, Shenzhen Municipal Planning Bureau announced that it would change the nomenclature of Shenzhen's subway lines according to the "2007 Urban Rail Transit Plan Scheme". Instead of using numbers as the lines official designation, as typically used in other mainland Chinese metro systems, lines would be given Chinese names more akin to the Hong Kong MTR. In 2010, the Scheme was reviewed and adjusted with new routes and names in addition to newly proposed lines. On October 23, 2013, the SZMC (Shenzhen Metro Group) decided that current operational lines will have their number and names combined, while future lines will only be numbered. Due to the change in the construction order of several lines, some numerical names have been reviewed in order to prevent big jump between numbers. By 2016, only numerical names are used.

Lines currently in operation:

Original No.	2007 Scheme	2010 Scheme	Current name
Line 1	Luobao Line	Luobao Line (Line 1)	Line 1
Line 2	Shekou Line	Shekou Line (Line 2)	Line 2
Line 3	Longgang Line	Longgang Line (Line 3)	Line 3
Line 4	Longhua Line	Longhua Line (Line 4)	Line 4
Line 5	Huanzhong Line	Huanzhong Line (Line 5)	Line 5
Line 7	Xili Line	Xili Line (Line 7)	Line 7
Line 8	Yantian Line	Yantian Line (Line 8)	Line 2 Extension (Line 8 Phase 1)
Line 9	Neihuan Line	Meilin Line (Line 9)	Line 9
Line 16	Pinghu Line	Bantian Line (Line 16/Line 10)	Line 10
Line 11	Airport Line	Airport Line (Line 11)	Line 11
Line 10	Bao'an Line	Nanbao Line (Line 10/Line 12)	Line 12
Line 14	Eastern Express	Eastern Express (Line 14)	Line 14
Line 12	Pingshan Line	Longping Line (Line 12/Line 16)	Line 16
–	–	Fuyong Line (Line 20)	Line 20 (International Expo Conveyance Project)

Lines under construction:

Original No.	2007 Scheme	2010 Scheme	Current name
Line 15	Shiyan Line	Shiyan Line (Line 15/Line 13)	Line 13

=== Phase II (2007–2011) + 2025 ===
From 2004 to 2007, there was a lack of official government interest and attention to expanding the subway after completion of Phase 1 with little or no active projects. Subway construction speed was ridiculed as "earthworm speed". On January 17, 2007, Shenzhen won the right to host the 2011 Universiade. In the bid Shenzhen committed to complete 155 km (96 mi) of subway lines before the games. The mayor of Shenzhen at the time, Xu Zongheng, sharply criticized the speed and efficiency of Shenzhen's subway construction procedures and calls for reform. Subsequently, the Shenzhen municipal government and various departments signed a liability form, requiring Phase II subway expansion to be completed in time for the Universiade. Shenzhen Metro increased to over a hundred operating metro stations in June 2011, just before the Shenzhen Universiade games. In the span of two weeks, the network expanded from 64 km (40 mi) to 177 km (110 mi). This expansion increased rail transit's share of total public transit trips from 6% to 29% in 2014.

Date Opened	Line	Termini		Length in km	Stations
September 28, 2009	Line 1 – phase 2 (trial)	Window of the World	Shenzhen University	3.33	3
December 28, 2010	Line 2 – phase 1	Chiwan	Window of the World	15.52	12
December 28, 2010	Line 3 – phase 1 (elevated section)	Shuanglong	Caopu	25.14	16
June 15, 2011	Line 1 – phase 2	Shenzhen University	Airport East	20.3	12
June 16, 2011	Line 4 – phase 2 (first north extension)	Children's Palace	Qinghu	15.8	10
June 22, 2011	Line 5 – phase 1	Qianhaiwan	Huangbeiling	40.0	27
June 28, 2011	Line 2 – phase 2 (first east extension)	Window of the World	Xinxiu	20.26	17
June 28, 2011	Line 3 – phase 1 (underground section) & phase 2 (first south extension)	Caopu	Yitian	16.6	14
December 28, 2025	Line 5 – phase 1 (remaining section)	Huangbeiling	Grand Theater	2.88	3

=== Phase III (2012–2023) ===
In 2010, the Shenzhen Urban Planning and Land Resources Committee proposed a building program (Phase III) between 2011 and 2020. In 2011 this plan was approved by the NDRC. Phase III formally commenced in May 2011 with an expected cost of 125.6 billion yuan. It will cover Lines 6, 7, 8, 9, and 11 and will extend the length of the Shenzhen Metro to 348 kilometres (216 mi) and 10 lines. In June 2011, the Shenzhen Urban Planning and Land Resources Commission started gather public input on Phase III station names. On June 28, 2016, Line 11 opened being the first subway line in Shenzhen with 8 car trains and 120 km/h (75 mph) maximum service speed and the first in China with a First Class service. Lines 7 and 9 followed on October 28, 2016. South extension of Line 5 opened on September 28, 2019, and west extension of Line 9 opened on December 8, 2019. Line 6 and Line 10 opened on August 18, 2020, bringing the length of the Shenzhen Metro to 382.1 km (237.4 mi) and the fourth longest in China. Second east extension of Line 2, second south extension of Line 3, second north extension of Line 4 and phase 1 of Line 8 opened on October 28, 2020, bringing the length of the Shenzhen Metro to 411 km (255 mi). Phase III is also the first phase in which the lines are officially numbered instead of named and colored.

Date Opened	Line	Termini		Length in km	Stations
June 28, 2016	Line 11 – phase 1	Futian	Bitou	51.7	18
October 28, 2016	Line 7 – phase 1	Tai'an	Xili Lake	30.16	28
October 28, 2016	Line 9 – phase 1	Wenjin	Hongshuwan South	25.39	22
September 28, 2019	Line 5 – phase 2	Qianhaiwan	Chiwan	7.65	7
December 8, 2019	Line 9 – phase 2	Hongshuwan South	Qianwan	10.79	10
August 18, 2020	Line 6 – phase 1 & 2	Science Museum	Songgang	49.39	27
August 18, 2020	Line 10	Futian Checkpoint	Shuangyong Street	29.31	24
October 28, 2020	Line 2 – phase 3 (second east extension)	Xinxiu	Liantang	3.78	3
October 28, 2020	Line 3 – phase 3 (second south extension)	Yitian	Futian Bonded Area	1.45	1
October 28, 2020	Line 4 – phase 3 (second north extension)	Qinghu	Niuhu	10.8	8
October 28, 2020	Line 8 (through operation to 2) – phase 1	Liantang	Yantian Road	12.14	7
December 27, 2023	Line 8 (through operation to 2) – phase 2	Yantian Road	Xiaomeisha	8.01	4

=== Phase IV & Phase IV revised expansion (2017–2027) ===
With the shortening of the Phase III implementation period, a number of lines (Lines 16 and 12) planned in 2007's Phase III moved into the next phase. By 2016, it was determined that Phase IV will have an implementation period between 2017 and 2022 and consist of 274 km (170 mi) of new subway. Lines 13 and 14 which originally had a long term 2030 completion deadline were moved into Phase IV expansion. In addition, a branch line of Line 6 will connect with the neighboring Dongguan Rail Transit system. Lines 12, 13, 14, and 16 and branch of Line 6 was approved by the NDRC in July 2017 and started construction in January 2018. The first phase of Line 20 was fast tracked from Phase IV to provide a shuttle between Line 11 and a new International Convention Center, now called Convention & Exhibition City. The construction started in September 2016, but as for early 2019, the construction is paused because the Development and Reform Commission did not approve the project. The Phase IV revised plan approved by the NDRC on March 26, 2020, approved the first Phase of Line 20 allowing for construction to continue. The line eventually opened on December 28, 2021. Futian to Gangxia North in the first section of Phase 2 of Line 11 opened on October 28, 2022 in tandem with Line 14 Phase I. Soon after, Line 6 Branch and Line 12 Phase I opened on November 28, 2022, and Line 16 Phase I opened on December 28, 2022. Two years later, Line 3 Phase IV, Line 7 Phase II, Line 11 Phase II, Line 12 Phase II and Line 13 Phase I south section opened on December 28, 2024. On 28 September 2025, Line 6 Branch Phase II and Line 16 Phase II opened, and three months later, Line 8 Phase III, the remaining station of Line 11 Phase II and Line 13 Phase I north section opened on 28 December 2025, bringing the length of the Shenzhen Metro to 622 km (386 mi).

Date Opened	Line	Termini		Length in km	Stations
December 28, 2021	Line 20 – phase 1	Airport North	Convention & Exhibition City	8.43	5
October 28, 2022	Line 11 – phase 2 (trial)	Futian	Gangxia North	1.68	1
October 28, 2022	Line 14 – phase 1	Gangxia North	Shatian	50.32	17
November 28, 2022	Line 6 Branch – phase 1	Guangming	SIAT	6.13	4
November 28, 2022	Line 12 – phase 1	Zuopaotai East	Waterlands Resort East	40.54	33
December 28, 2022	Line 16 – phase 1	Universiade	Tianxin	29.2	24
December 28, 2024	Line 3 – phase 4	Shuanglong	Pingdi Liulian	9.28	7
December 28, 2024	Line 7 – phase 2	Xili Lake	SZU Lihu Campus	2.22	2
December 28, 2024	Line 11 – phase 2	Gangxia North	Huaqiang South	2.05	2
December 28, 2024	Line 12 – phase 2	Waterlands Resort East	Songgang	8.05	5
December 28, 2024	Line 13 – phase 1 (South section)	Shenzhen Bay Checkpoint	Hi-Tech Central	6.36	7
September 28, 2025	Line 6 Branch – phase 2	Guangmingcheng	Guangming	4.95	3
September 28, 2025	Line 16 – phase 2	Yuanshan Xikeng	Universiade	9.54	8
December 28, 2025	Line 8 – phase 3	Xiaomeisha	Xichong	3.69	1
December 28, 2025	Line 11 – remaining station	Huaqiang South	Hongling South	2.34	1
December 28, 2025	Line 13 – phase 1 (North section)	Hi-Tech Central	Shangwu	16.86	9
June 28, 2026	Line 13 – phase 2 (North section)	Shangwu	Lisonglang	19.25	11

== Future expansion ==
=== Phase IV Revised Expansion ===
The Phase IV revised plan approved by the NDRC on March 26, 2020, added a number of extension projects.

Expected opening	Line	Section	Terminals		Length in km	Stations
2027	13	Phase 2 South	Shenzhen Bay Checkpoint	Dongjiaotou	4.07	3

=== Phase V (2023–2028) ===
In the Shenzhen Metro 2007 masterplan proposed four more lines (Lines 13, 14, 15 and 16) which have a planned completion target of 2030. In 2016, all aforementioned lines but Line 15 were designated as part of the Phase IV expansion, moving the completion date forward from 2030 to 2022. In 2012, four further lines Qiannan (Line 17), Pinghu (Line 18), Pingshan (Line 19) and Fuyong (Line 20) where unveiled, making the total planned length of the Shenzhen Metro to 720 km (447 mi) spread out over 20 lines. The first phase of Line 20 was fast-tracked and included in the Phase III revised expansion with a completion date of 2018. This leaves Line 15, 17–19 and the rest of Line 20 available for the next phase (Phase V) of subway expansion. In September 2022, the Shenzhen municipal government confirmed the projects proposed to be included in its phase V expansion. A total of 227 km (141 mi) of new lines are proposed.

On March 31, 2023, the Bureau of Housing and Urban Rural Development of Shenzhen Metro Municipality will open the bidding for the fifth phase planning of Shenzhen Metro Metro, including Line 15, Line 17 Phase I, Line 19 Phase I, Line 20 Phase II (Airport East—Baishizhou), Line 22 Phase I, Line 25 Phase I, Line 27 Phase I, Line 29 Phase I and Line 32 Phase I, This means that these 9 lines have been approved with an investment amount of 191.1 billion yuan. However, Line 18 Phase I, Line 21 Phase I, Line 10 East Extension (Shenzhen Section) and Metro Line 11 North Extension (Shenzhen Section), which were previously proposed to be included in the fifth phase plan of Shenzhen Metro, were not included in this announcement.

In June 2023, the Fifth Phase Construction Plan of Shenzhen Urban Rail Transit (2023–2028) has been approved for a total of 11 construction projects, including Line 15, Line 17 Phase I, Line 19 Phase I, Line 20 Phase II (Airport East—Baishizhou), Line 22 Phase I, Line 25 Phase I, Line 27 Phase I, Line 29 Phase I, Line 32 Phase I, Line 10 East Extension (Shenzhen Section) and Metro Line 11 North Extension (Shenzhen Section).

Line	Section	Terminals		Length in km	Stations	Status
10	East extension	Shuangyong Street	Huanggekeng	9.8 (2.9 in Shenzhen)	5	Approved
11	North extension	Bitou	Chang'an	3.7 (0.8 in Shenzhen)	1	Approved
14	West extension	Gangxia North	Xiangmihu West		1	Approved
15		Loop Line		32.2	24	Under Construction
17	Phase 1	Luohu West	Shanglilang	18.8	18	Under Construction
19	Phase 1	Nantangwei	Julong	12.5	12	Under Construction
20	Phase 2	Airport North	Baishizhou	24.9	11	Under Construction
22	Phase 1	Shangsha	Liguang	34.2	21	Under Construction
25	Phase 1	Shilong	Jihua Hospital	16.2	14	Under Construction
27	Phase 1	Songpingcun, Jihua Hospital	Gangtou West, Lizhi Orchard	25.6	21	Under Construction
29	Phase 1	Hongshuwan South	Xingdong	11.3	10	Under Construction
32	Phase 1	Xichong	Kuichong East	9.5	4	Under Construction
Total				196.3	140	

=== Long-term plan ===
Aside from the set masterplan, at the 12th Guangdong Provincial People's Congress in January 2014, it was proposed to extend Line 4 beyond the planned Phase III terminus at the Songyuan Bus Terminal in Guanlan. The proposal wanted to further extend this line to reach the future planned Dongguan Metro Line 4 at Tangxia station. This proposal aims to shorten the distance between the two cities in residents' minds, boost tourism industries in both cities and expand housing options. It would also allow for direct connection between Hong Kong and Dongguan. As the area in the proposed area is less developed, the cost in building the line is expected to be lower, with a feasibility study yet to be conducted. In addition to metro lines, 5 Pearl River Delta Rapid Transit lines connecting neighboring urban centers in the Pearl River Delta such as Dongguan, Huizhou, Foshan and Guangzhou, totaling 146 km (91 mi), have also been revealed. In 2016, an even more ambitious masterplan, expanding the previously planned 20 lines to 32, was unveiled. The new plan envisions a 1,142 km (710 mi) subway network to be completed by 2030. This will allow for travel between the central and suburban districts to be shortened to 45 minutes and for public transit to make up more than 70% of all motorized trips in Shenzhen.

== Ridership ==
Annual Ridership
Year	million riders	±% p.a.
2005	58	—
2006	90	+55.17%
2007	118	+31.11%
2008	136	+15.25%
2009	138	+1.47%
2010	163	+18.12%
2011	460	+182.21%
2012	781	+69.78%
2013	914	+17.03%
2014	1,037	+13.46%
2015	1,122	+8.20%
2016	1,297	+15.60%
2017	1,654	+27.53%
2018	1,878	+13.54%
2019	2,018	+7.45%
2020	1,623	−19.57%
2021	2,178	+34.20%
2022	1,751	−19.61%
2023	2,711	+54.83%
2024	3,102	+14.42%
2025	2,988	−3.68%

Since the opening of the first phase in 2004, there has been a steady growth in passenger traffic. In 2009 and 2010, passenger traffic soared with major openings of new phase 2 lines, with a three-fold increase in passenger traffic in 2010. On July 12, 2019, it set a new record for its peak ridership at 6.63 million.

July is the busiest month of the year for the Shenzhen Metro, accounting for 9.3% of annual passenger traffic, while January is the least busy month, accounting for only 6.7%. This is caused by Shenzhen's large migrant worker population.

== Fares and tickets ==
Metro rides are priced according to distance travelled, and fares vary from 2 RMB to 15 RMB. For first 4 km (2.5 mi), the fare is 2 RMB. The fare is increased 1 RMB for journey each 4 km (2.5 mi) from 4 km (2.5 mi) to 12 km (7.5 mi); after that 1 RMB for journey each 6 km (3.7 mi) from 12 km (7.5 mi) to 24 km (15 mi) and increased 1 RMB for each 8 km (5.0 mi) from 24 km (15 mi) onwards. For passengers who wish to ride on business coach in line 11 and 13, they have to pay 2 times the amount of price that calculated by the regulations above.

Distance (km)	Fares (RMB)
0~4	2 RMB for first 4 km (2.5 mi)
4~12	+1 RMB for each 4 km (2.5 mi)
12~24	+1 RMB for each 8 km (5.0 mi)
over 24	+1 RMB for each 8 km (5.0 mi)

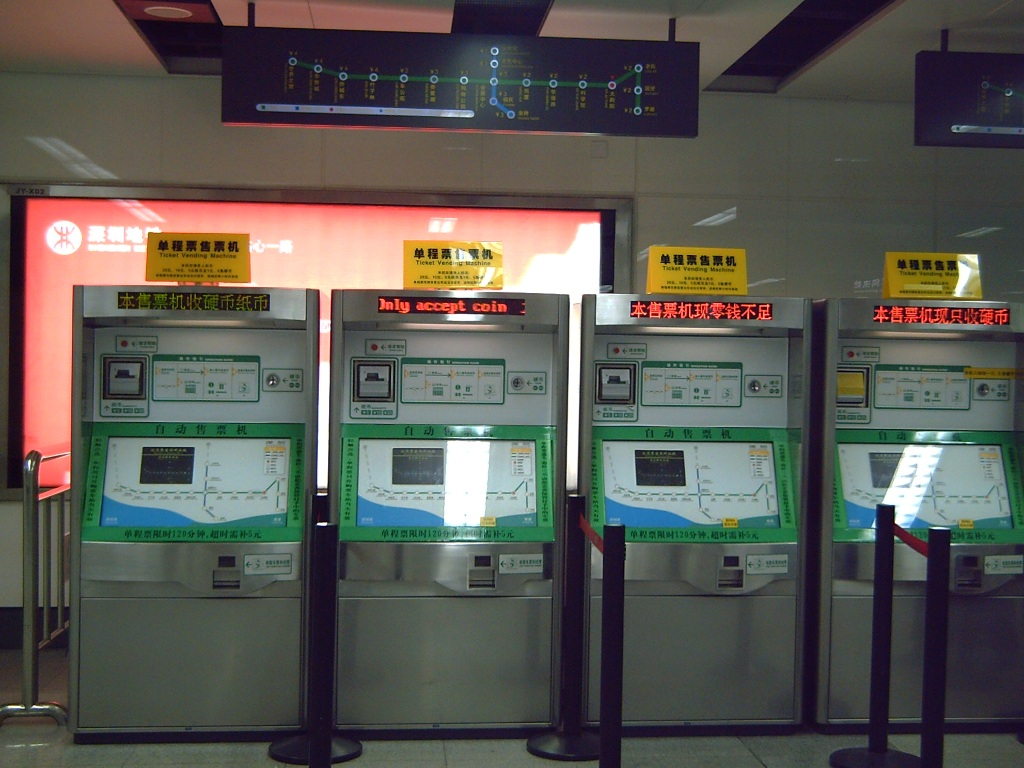
Ticket vending machines at Grand Theater station in 2005

Children under the height of 120 cm (3 ft 11 in) or aged below 6 may ride for free when accompanied by an adult. The metro also offers free rides to senior citizens over the age of 65, the physically disabled and military personnel. Tickets for children between 120 cm (3 ft 11 in) and 150 cm (4 ft 11 in), or aged between 6 and 14 years, or middle school students, are half priced.

Metro fares can be paid for with single-ride tokens, multiple-ride Shenzhen Tong cards or 1-day passes and 3-day passes.

=== Tokens ===
Shenzhen Metro RFID Token

When using cash, a RFID token (NXP Mifare Classic) is purchased and used for a single, non-returnable journey. There are two different types of tokens, with green tokens for Standard Class, and yellow tokens used for Business Class which is only available on Line 11. All ticket vending machines offer both English and Chinese interface. The purchaser touches a station name to calculate the fare. After payment, a green token is dispensed, which must be scanned at the entrance station and deposited at the exit station. A penalty applies should a token be lost. Purchasers of green tokens cannot ride Business Class on Line 11 directly. Instead, they must get off at any transfer stations with Line 11 and purchase a separate yellow token.

Note that as of 2015, many machines accept only 5 or 10 RMB notes. The token(s) are only valid at the station where issued. Passengers are unable to buy an extra token for return journey prior to departure. Baggage X-Ray machines are located at each station, and may be staffed during peak hours.

=== Shenzhen Tong cards ===
Shenzhen Tong is a pre-paid currency card similar to Oyster card system in London and the Octopus card system used in Hong Kong. The multiple fare card stores credit purchased at stations. The card can be used by waving it in front of the card reader located at all entrances and exits to the subway system. Riders who pay for metro fare with a card receive a 5% discount. Since March 1, 2008, riders who pay for a bus fare with a card and then a subway fare within 90 minutes receive an additional 0.4 RMB discount on the subway fare. Card users pay a distance based fare.

Since June 30, 2011, cards containing both a Shenzhen Tong and Hong Kong Octopus chip have been available in both Shenzhen and Hong Kong. There are plans to further integrate the two systems, and for a new card which will be accepted all over Guangdong province and China's two SARs.

Unlike Hong Kong Octopus Cards, Shenzhen Tong cards cannot be sold back to the stations or have faults dealt with by SZMC. Instead, the customer must go to the offices of Shenzhen Tong. Students studying in Shenzhen can use the Shenzhen Tong to receive a 50% discount.

Note that discounts are not applicable for people who ride Business Class carriages on Line 11.

Metro cards can also be used on Shenzhen's public bus system.

=== Metro 1-day and 3-day passes ===
Metro 1-day pass and 3-day pass is a smart card that allowed the card holder have unlimited access of the metro system in 24 or 72 continuous hours. Passengers can purchase a 1-day pass for RMB 25 and 3-day pass for RMB 75 in the service center in any metro station. The pass will be activated and the passenger will have 24 continuous hour for unlimited access after the first entrance. When the pass expired, the pass is no longer available for entering a station but able to exiting a station and finish a journey in 27.5 hours. The 1-day passes and 3-day pass are not applicable for Business Class carriages on Line 11.

=== UnionPay Quickpass ===
All UnionPay (both physical and virtual) cards with contactless payment can be used at all stations of Shenzhen Metro system and ensure that the balance or available limit in the card is not lower than the maximum one-way fare is 15 RMB.

=== EMV Cards ===
Starting from 30 June 2026, Shenzhen Metro began trial operation of this ‘tap and ride’ service by using international bank card on whole network. Cards issued by Visa, Mastercard, American Express, JCB outside Mainland China are supported, along with UnionPay. This service is also available for passengers enter Line 11 Business car by using validator machine.

=== e-CNY ===
Starting from 3 November 2026, Shenzhen Metro launched e-CNY digital payments on whole network. Passenger can use the e-CNY QR code or IC cards support e-CNY payments to pass through the gate.

== Station facilities, amenities and services ==
Some stations have toilets (free of charge), and public telephones. SZMC also operates luggage storage facilities in the concourse above Luohu Station. Mobile phone service is available throughout the system provided by China Mobile, China Telecom, and China Unicom.

Like the Hong Kong MTR, Guangzhou, and Foshan metros, station announcements are in Mandarin, Cantonese and English. Some announcements, such as train arrival, are in Mandarin and English only. Cantonese, an important local language, is chosen for the local Cantonese population as well as Cantonese speakers in Guangdong, Hong Kong and Macau.

The stations of Line 6 and Line 10 are the first metro stations in China to have 5G coverage.

Line 11 is the only line of the Shenzhen Metro to have business class carriages. Two of a total of eight carriages are business class carriages, but the business class carriages have been criticised due to low usage.

== Equipment ==
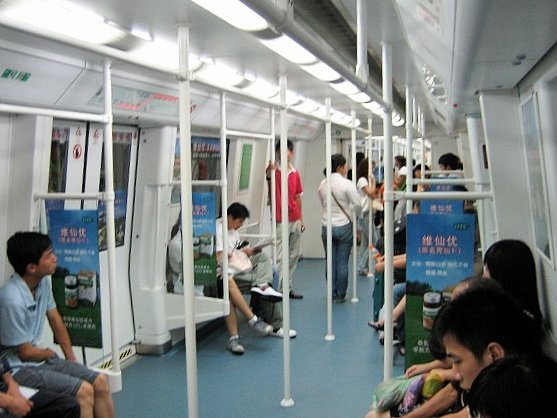
Bombardier rolling stock on Line 1

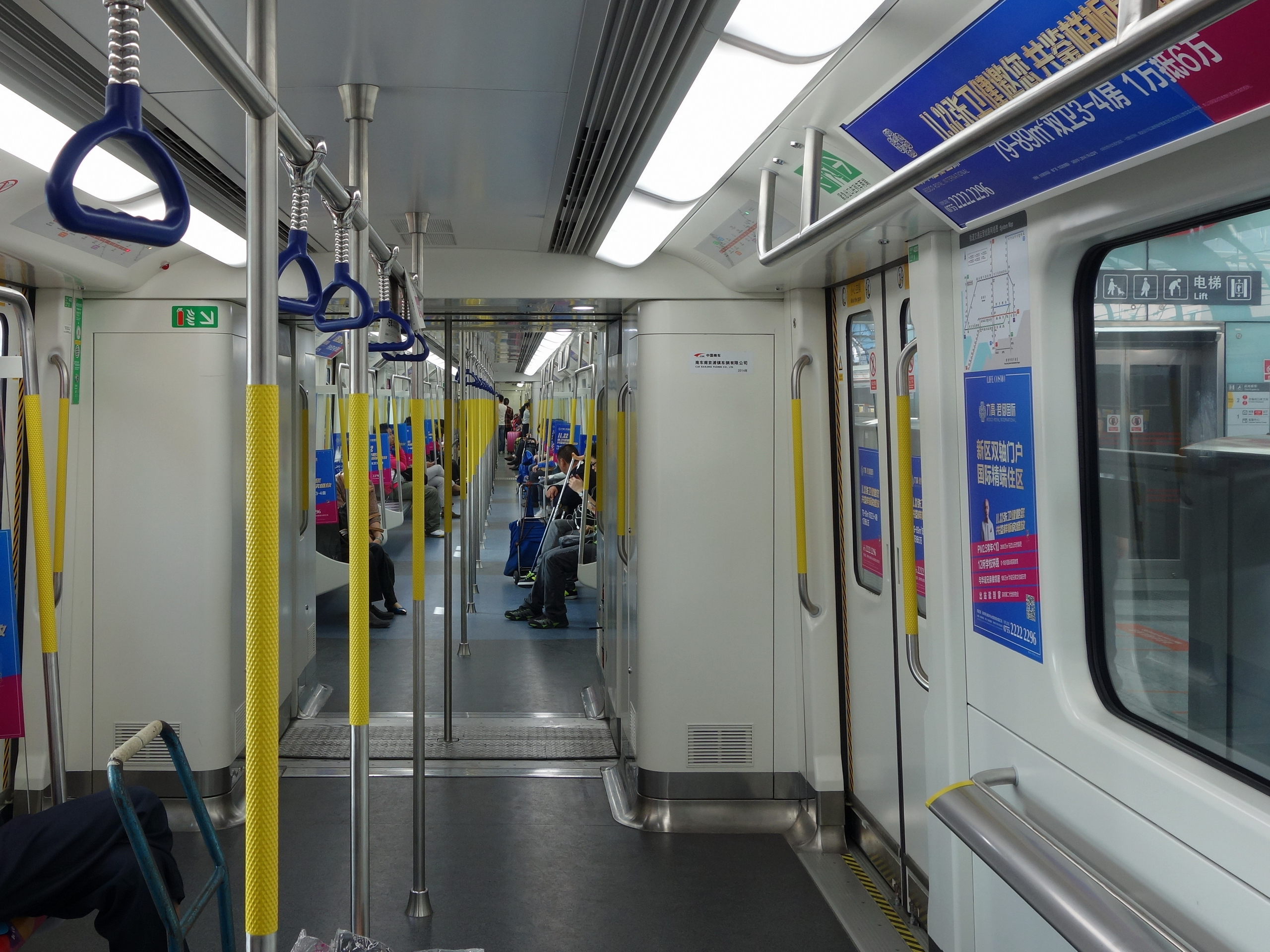
CRRC Nanjing Puzhen rolling stock on Line 4

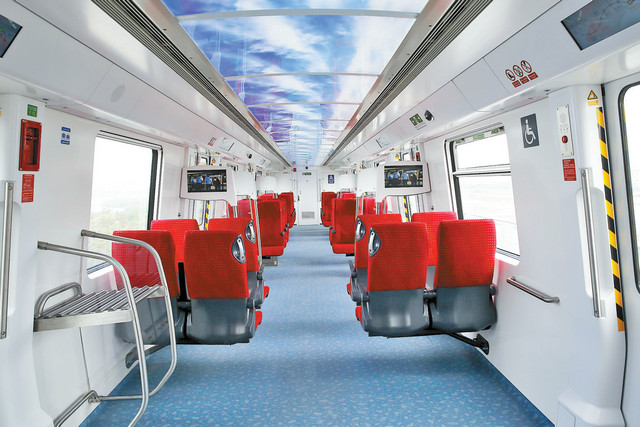
CRRC Zhuzhou rolling stock on Line 11 (Business Class)

=== Rolling stock ===
==== Line 1 ====
- 22 Bombardier Transportation Movia 456 6-car sets (101–122, Some trains now use CRRC Times Electric traction units after have a maintenance in Changchun)
- 4 Changchun Railway Vehicles Type A 6-car sets, traction units by Bombardier Transportation (123–126)
- 26 Zhuzhou Electric Locomotive Works Type A 6-car sets, traction units by Siemens (127–152, Some trains now use CRRC Times Electric traction units after have a maintenance in Zhuzhou)
- 33 Zhuzhou Electric Locomotive Works Type A 6-car sets, traction units by CSR Times Electric (153–185)

==== Line 2 ====
- 35 Changchun Railway Vehicles Type A 6-car sets, traction units by Bombardier Transportation (201–235)
- 16 Changchun Railway Vehicles Type A 6-car sets, traction units by Bombardier Transportation (236–239、241–251), by CRRC Qingdao Sifang (240).
- 6 Zhuzhou Electric Locomotive Works Type A 6-car sets, traction units by CRRC Times Electric (252–257)
- 9 Zhuzhou Electric Locomotive Works Type A 4-car sets, traction units by CRRC Times Electric (282–290)

==== Line 3 ====
- 43 Changchun Railway Vehicles Type B 6-car sets, traction units by Hyundai Rotem (301–343, Some trains now use CRRC Times Electric traction units after have a maintenance in Changchun)
- 33 Nanjing Puzhen Rolling Stock Works Type B 6-car sets, traction units by Hyundai Rotem (344–376)
- 22 Nanjing Puzhen Rolling Stock Works Type B 6-car sets, traction units by Jiangsu Kingway Rail (377-398)

==== Line 4 ====
- 28 Nanjing Puzhen Rolling Stock Works Type A 6-car sets, traction units by ABB (401–428)
- 24 Nanjing Puzhen Rolling Stock Works Type A 6-car sets, traction units by Nanjing Huashi (429–452)

==== Line 5 ====
- 22 Zhuzhou Electric Locomotive Works Type A 6-car sets, traction units by Siemens (501–522)
- 8 Zhuzhou Electric Locomotive Works Type A 6-car sets, traction units by CSR Times Electric (523–530)
- 21 Changchun Railway Vehicles Type A 6-car sets, traction units by Bombardier Transportation (531–551)
- 6 Zhuzhou Electric Locomotive Works Type A 6-car sets, traction units by CRRC Times Electric (552–557)
- 39 Changchun Railway Vehicles Type A 6-car sets, traction units by CRRC Times Electric (559–597)

==== Line 6 ====
- 51 Nanjing Puzhen Rolling Stock Works Type A 6-car sets, traction units by Bombardier Transportation (601–651)

==== Line 6 Branch ====
- 9 Nanjing Puzhen Rolling Stock Works Type B 6-car sets, traction units by INVT (6Z01–6Z09)

==== Line 7 ====
- 41 Changchun Railway Vehicles Type A 6-car sets, traction units by Bombardier Transportation (701–741)

==== Line 8 ====
- 24 Zhuzhou Electric Locomotive Works Type A 6-car sets, traction units by CRRC Times Electric (258–281[801–824], 273-281[816-824] traction units sounds are much higher)

==== Line 9 ====
- 29 Changchun Railway Vehicles Type A 6-car sets, traction units by CRRC Times Electric (901–929).
- 22 Changchun Railway Vehicles Type A 6-car sets, traction units by INVT (930–951).

==== Line 10 ====
- 35 Changchun Railway Vehicles Type A 8-car sets, traction units by CRRC Times Electric (1001–1035)

==== Line 11 ====
- 33 Zhuzhou Electric Locomotive Works Type A 8-car sets, traction units by CRRC Times Electric (1101–1133)
- 40 Changchun Railway Vehicles Type A 8-car sets, traction units by CRRC Times Electric (1134–1173)

==== Line 12 ====
- 56 Nanjing Puzhen Rolling Stock Works Type A 6-car sets, traction units by Bombardier Transportation (1201–1256)

==== Line 13 ====
- 19 CRRC Qingdao Sifang Type A 8-car sets, traction units by Siemens (1301-1319)

==== Line 14 ====
- 44 Changchun Railway Vehicles Type A 8-car sets, traction units by CRRC Times Electric (1401–1444)

==== Line 16 ====
- 32 Zhuzhou Electric Locomotive Works Type A 6-car sets, traction units by Jiangsu Kingway Rail (1601–1632)
- 12 Zhuzhou Electric Locomotive Works Type A 6-car sets, traction units by Jiangsu Kingway Rail (1633–1644)

==== Line 20 ====
- 9 Changchun Railway Vehicles Type A 8-car sets, traction units by CRRC Times Electric (2001–2009)

=== Signalling system ===
On Line 1 and Line 4, Siemens supplied 7 (Phase 1) and 6 (Phase 2) LZB 700 M continuous automatic control systems; 7 (Phase 1) and 6 (Phase 2) electronic Sicas ESTT interlockings; the Vicos OC 501 operations control system with 2 operations control centers, fall-back level with Vicos OC 101 and RTU (FEP), 230 (Phase 1) and 240 (Phase 2) FTG S track vacancy detection units.

Line 2 and Line 5 use Casco CBTC system with 2.4 GHz frequencies, and so the system has suffered frequent problems with interference from consumer Wi-Fi equipment. By the end of November 2012, CASCO solved the problem on Lines 2 and 5 by switching to their standard solution with frequency diversity on 2 different channels.

== Overseas business ==
Shenzhen Metro Group participated in the expansion of outside Mainland China rail transit markets of 6 countries, covers 208.4 kilometers of rail distance: Addis Ababa in Ethiopia; Abuja in Nigeria; Tel Aviv in Israel; Hanoi in Vietnam; Egypt and Algiers in Algeria.

== Accidents and incidents ==
- April 4, 2011 – One worker was killed and four others injured on April 4 when a manually controlled chain hoist broke loose in a Line 5 tunnel in Longgang district. A preliminary investigation by district safety authorities found mechanical failure was to blame.
- September 9, 2013 – Three passengers abandoned in Line 1 tunnel after train door opens.
- June 25, 2015 – Worker killed during tunnel collapse in Line 7 construction.
- April 19, 2017 – Scaffolding for a metro station collapsed during the construction of the Line 8 on Yantian Rd, killing a worker and injuring three.
- May 11, 2017 – During the construction of the extension of Line 3 heavy rains caused a partial cave in at an excavation pit for a station on the southern extension of Line 3, killing 2 workers and injuring another.
- July 5–7, 2018 – Over a span of three days, at least seven incidents occurred, where power cables were accidentally cut at various construction sites of Shenzhen Metro, causing blackouts in large areas.
- July 10, 2018 – During the construction of Line 10, workers accidentally dug up the pipes of Shenzhen Buji Water Supply Co., Ltd., disrupting water distribution system. The Shenzhen Economic and Information Commission warned and penalized the contractor responsible.

== Connections ==
Pingshan Center station on Line 14 connects to Line 1 of the Pingshan Skyshuttle. This 8.5 km monorail line opened on December 28, 2022, with 11 stations, all in Pingshan district. Two of the stations will eventually connect to Line 16 stations.

== Branding ==
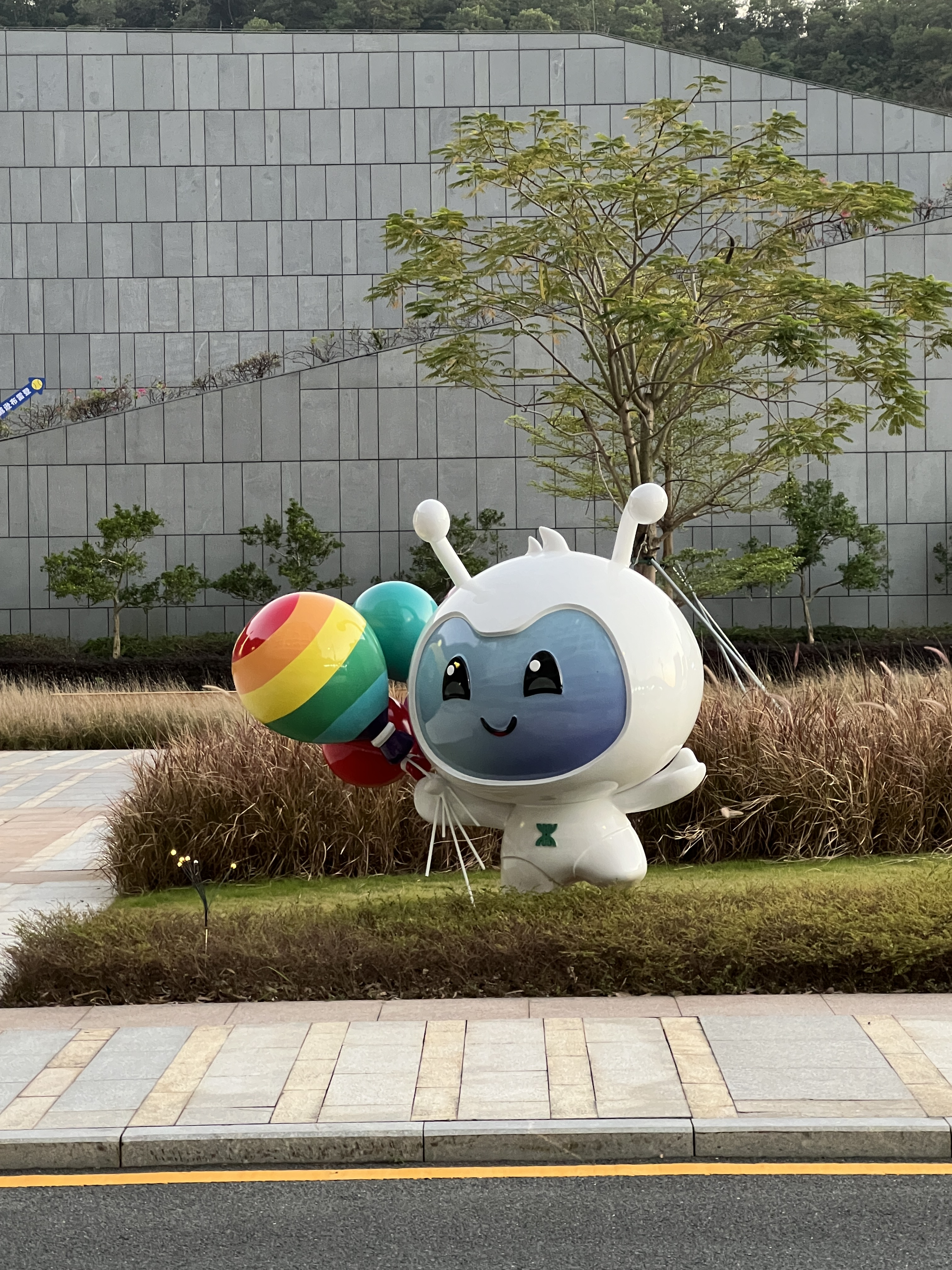
Tiebao

The mascot of Shenzhen Metro named "Tiebao" (Simplified Chinese: 铁宝; Traditional Chinese: 鐵寳) was unveiled on December 27, 2023. It is a cute anthropomorphic of a Shenzhen Metro train's front.

== See also ==
- List of Shenzhen Metro stations
- List of rapid transit systems
- Dongguan Rail Transit
- Foshan Metro (FMetro)
- Guangzhou Metro
- Hong Kong MTR
- List of metro systems
- Urban rail transit in China
