= Honganwei station =

Metro station in Shenzhen, Guangdong, China

Honganwei 鸿安围
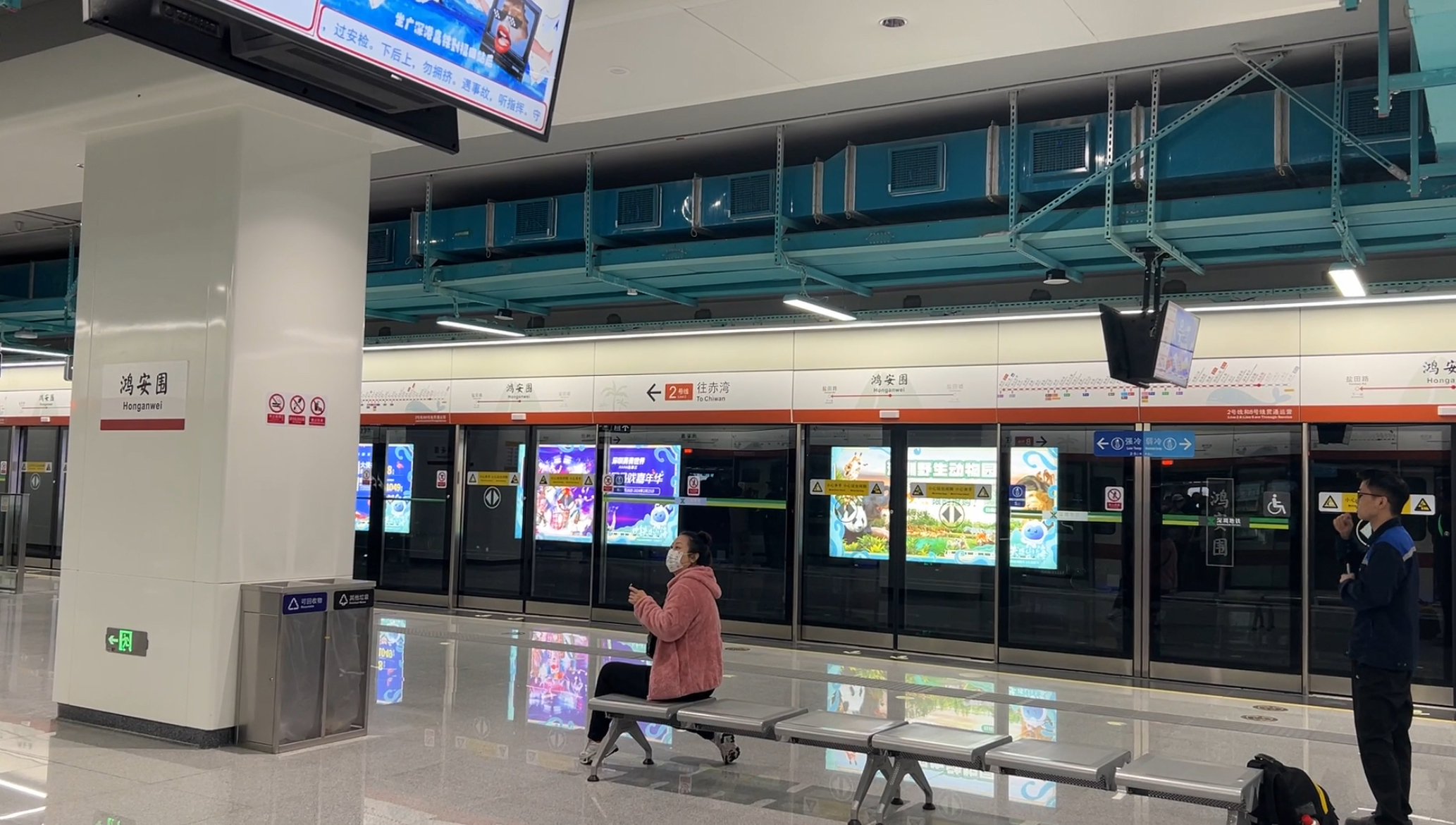
- Platform

Chinese name
- Traditional Chinese: 鴻安圍
- Simplified Chinese: 鸿安围
Transcriptions
Standard Mandarin
- Hanyu Pinyin: Hóngānwéi
Yue: Cantonese
- Yale Romanization: Hùngōnwài
- Jyutping: Hung4on1wai4

General information
- Location: Intersection of Beishan Road (北山道) and Hong'an Road (洪安路); Yantian Subdistrict, Yantian District, Shenzhen, Guangdong; China
- Coordinates: 22°35′36.0″N 114°15′34.8″E
- Operator: SZMC (Shenzhen Metro Group)
- Line: Line 8
- Platforms: 2 (1 island platform)
- Tracks: 2

Construction
- Structure type: Underground
- Accessible: Yes

History
- Opened: 27 December 2023
- Former names: Beishan Street (北山道)

Services
Preceding station	Shenzhen Metro	Following station
Yantian Road towards Liantang (Line 2: Chiwan)	Line 8	Yantianxu towards Xichong
Location

Honganwei (simplified Chinese: 鸿安围; traditional Chinese: 鴻安圍; pinyin: Hóngānwéi; Jyutping: Hung4on1wai4; Cantonese Yale: Hùngōnwài) is a metro station on Line 8 of Shenzhen Metro. It opened on 27 December 2023, with the Phase 2 extension of the line to Xiaomeisha.

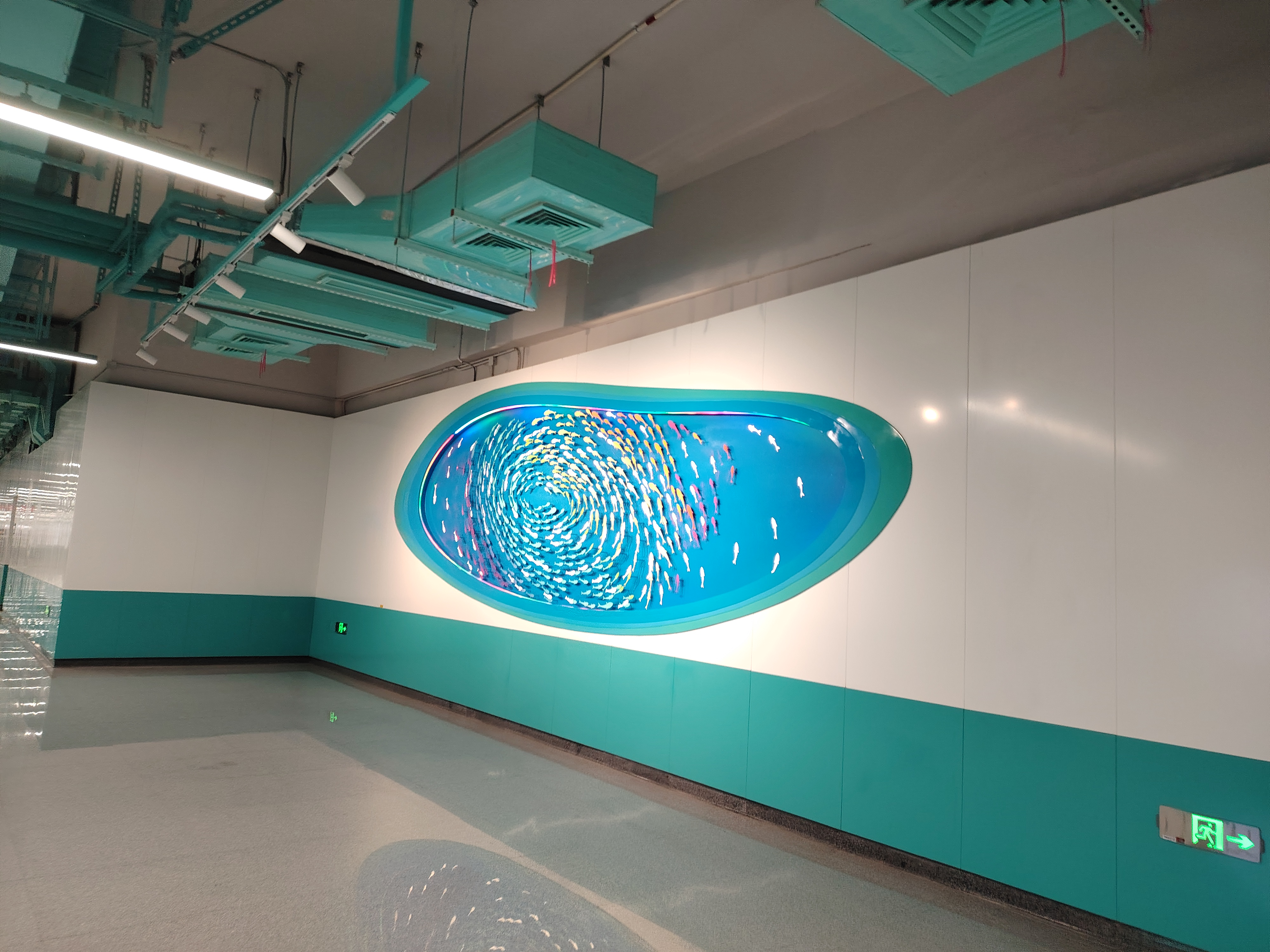
Art installation

== Station layout ==
The station has an island platform under Beishan Road.

G	–	Exits A-C
B1F; Concourse	Lobby	Ticket Machines, Customer Service
B2F; Platforms		2 towards Chiwan (Yantian Road)
B2F; Platforms	Island platform, doors will open on the left
B2F; Platforms		8 towards Xichong (Yantianxu)

=== Entrances/exits ===
The station has 5 points of entry/exit, with exits A1 and A2 being accessible via elevators.

- A1: north side of Beishan St (W), Mingzhuyuan, Yantian Beishan Industrial Area
- A2: south side of Beishan St (W), Yantian Fire Station, Yantian Shuangyong Park, Gengzi Uprising Zhongshan Memorial School, Nanfang Mingzhu Market
- B1: east side Hongan Rd, Yishanshidai
- B2: south side of Beishan St (E), Honganwei, Huaqiaoxincun, Shenzhen Yangang Middle School
- C: north side of Beishan St (E), Beishan Industrial Area II, Nanyuan Xiaoqu, Hanbang Building
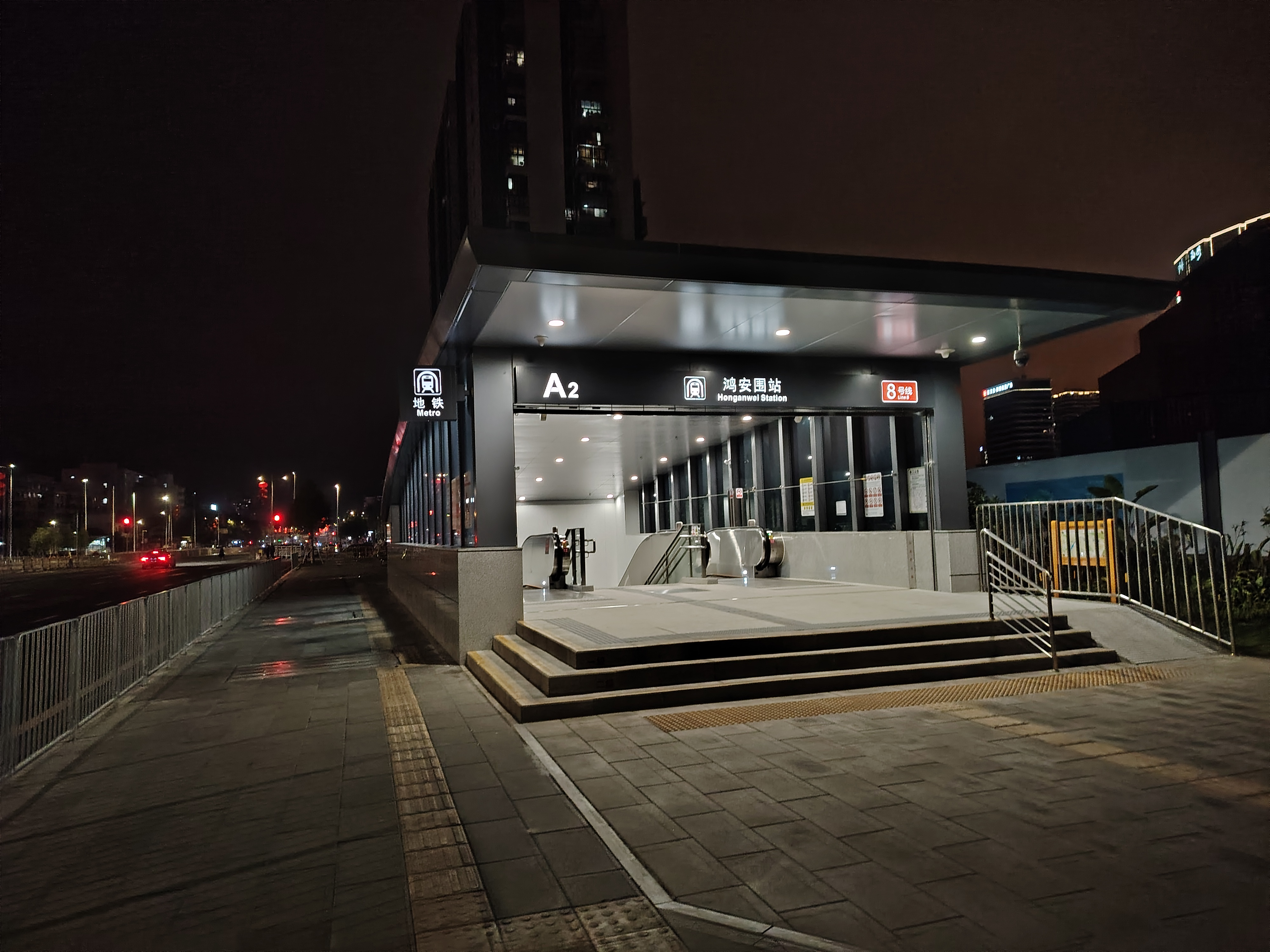
Entrance A2

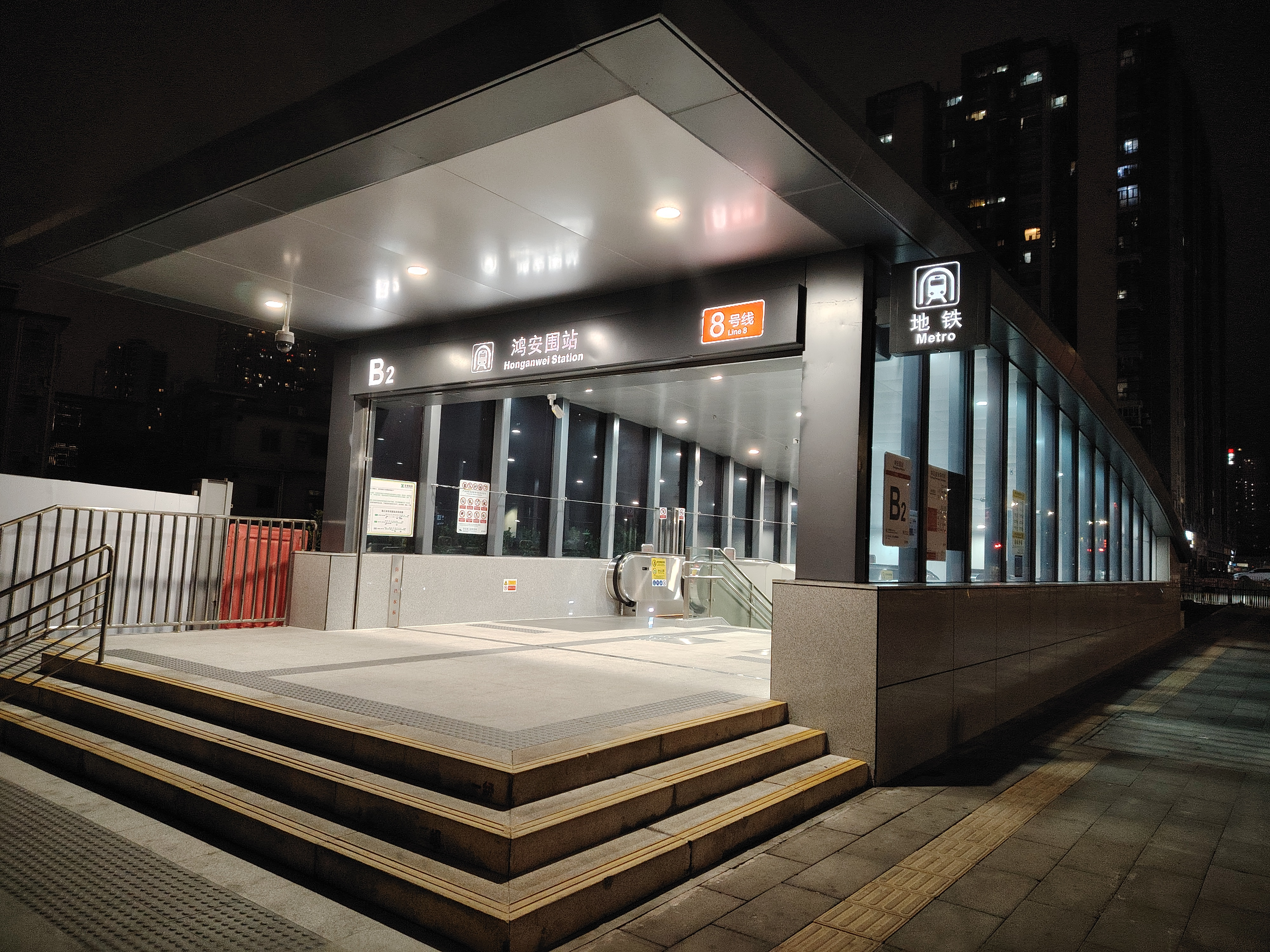
Entrance B2

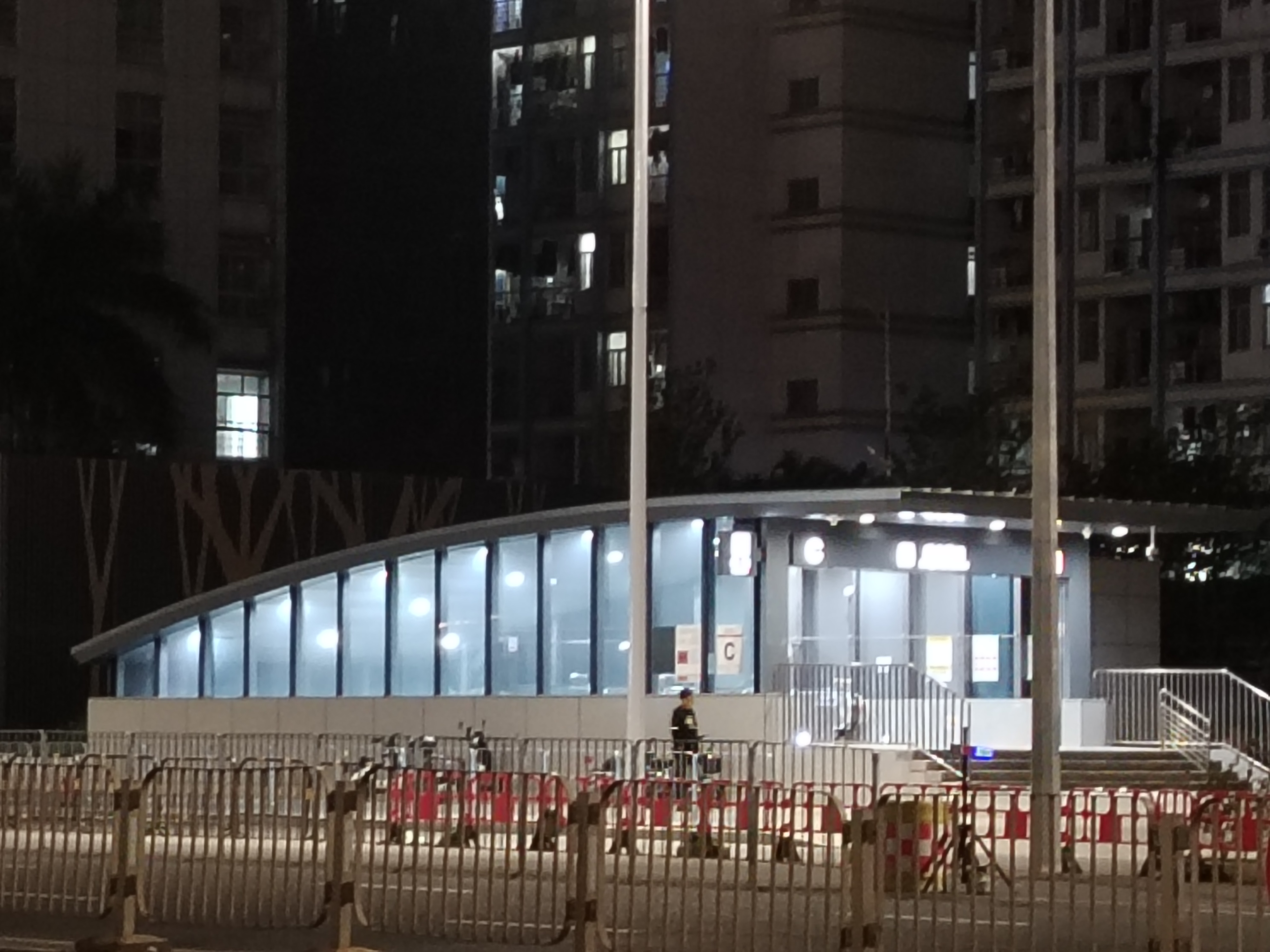
Entrance C
