= Yantianxu station =

Shenzhen Metro Line 8 station

Yantianxu 盐田墟
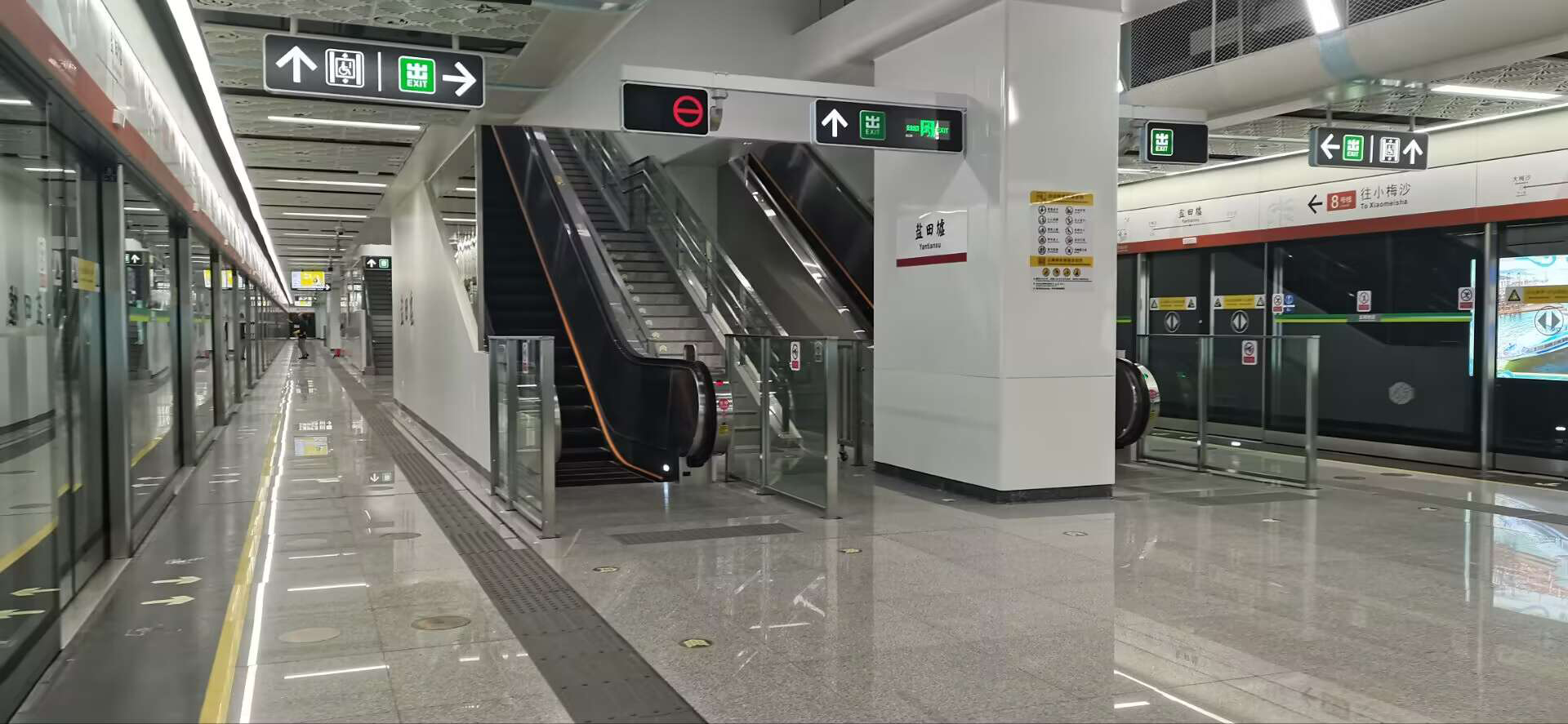
- Platform

Chinese name
- Traditional Chinese: 鹽田墟
- Simplified Chinese: 盐田墟
Transcriptions
Standard Mandarin
- Hanyu Pinyin: Yántián Xū
Yue: Cantonese
- Yale Romanization: Yìhmtìnhēui
- Jyutping: Yim4tin4heoi1

General information
- Location: Outside the intersection of Beishan Road (北山道), Yanmei Road (盐梅路) and Sancha Road (三岔路); Yantian District, Shenzhen, Guangdong; China
- Coordinates: 22°35′24.90″N 114°16′15.38″E
- Operated by: SZMC (Shenzhen Metro Group)
- Line: Line 8
- Platforms: 2 (1 island platform)
- Tracks: 2

Construction
- Structure type: Underground
- Accessible: Yes

History
- Opened: 27 December 2023 (2 years ago)
- Previous names: Yantian Food Street (盐田食街)

Services
Preceding station	Shenzhen Metro	Following station
Hong'anwei towards Liantang (Line 2: Chiwan)	Line 8	Dameisha towards Xichong
Location

Yantianxu station (simplified Chinese: 盐田墟; traditional Chinese: 鹽田墟; pinyin: Yántián Xū; Jyutping: Yim4tin4heoi1; Cantonese Yale: Yìhmtìnhēui) is a metro station on Line 8 of Shenzhen Metro. It opened on 27 December 2023, with the Phase 2 extension of the line to Xiaomeisha.

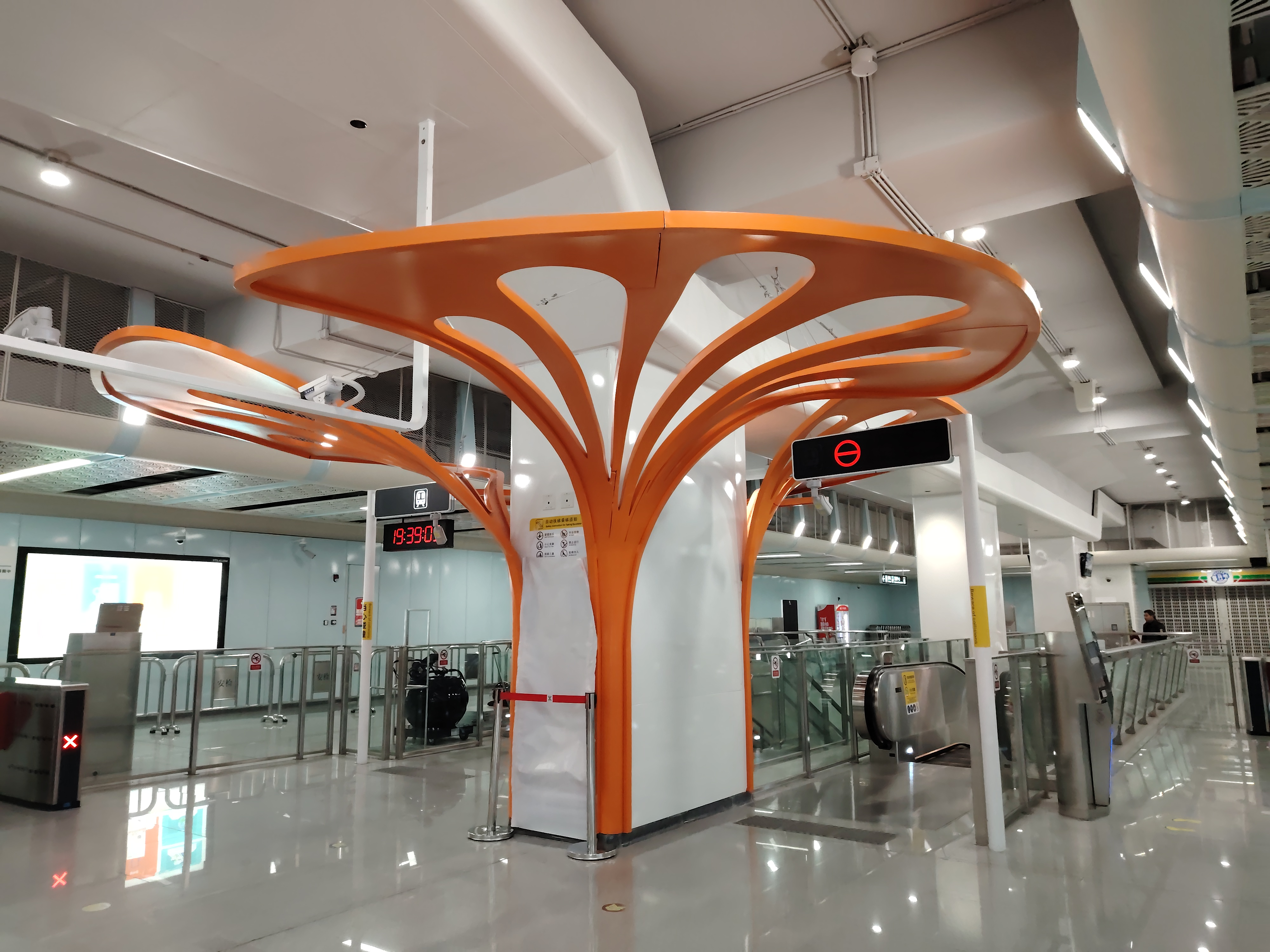
Art installation

== Station layout ==
The station has an island platform.

G	–	Exits A-C
B1F; Concourse	Lobby	Ticket Machines, Customer Service
B2F; Platforms		2 towards Chiwan (Hong'anwei)
B2F; Platforms	Island platform, doors will open on the left
B2F; Platforms		8 towards Xichong (Dameisha)

=== Entrances/exits ===
The station has 3 points of entry/exit, with Exits B and C being accessible via elevators.

- A: Yanmei Road, Beishan Road, Yangang Community, Yandunshan International Friendship Park
- B: Beishan Road, Yantian Fishermen's New Village, Yantian Seafood Street, Yantian Gold Pier (towards Nan'ao)
- C: Yanmei Road, Beishan Road, Yantian Overseas Chinese New Village
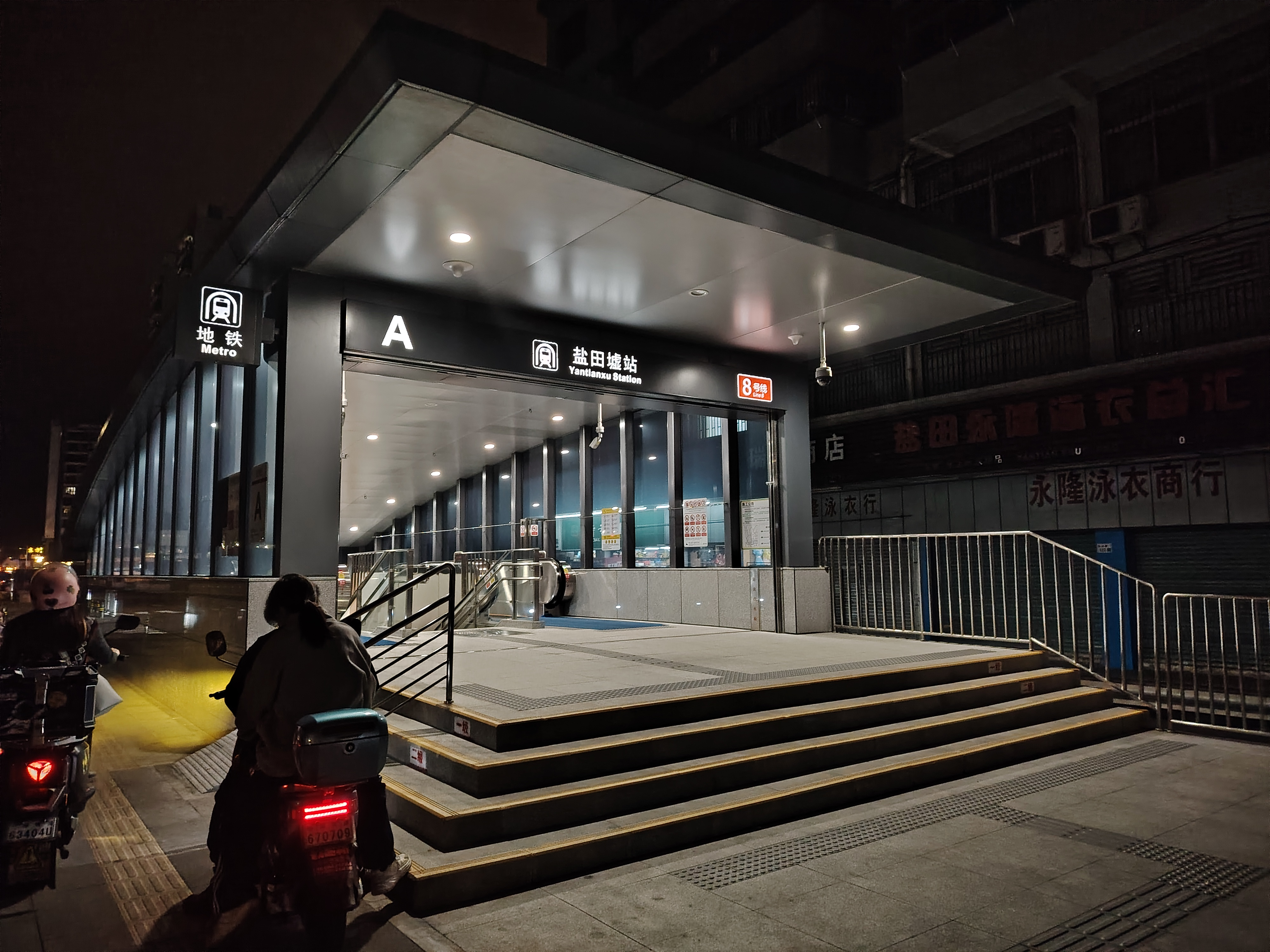
Entrance A

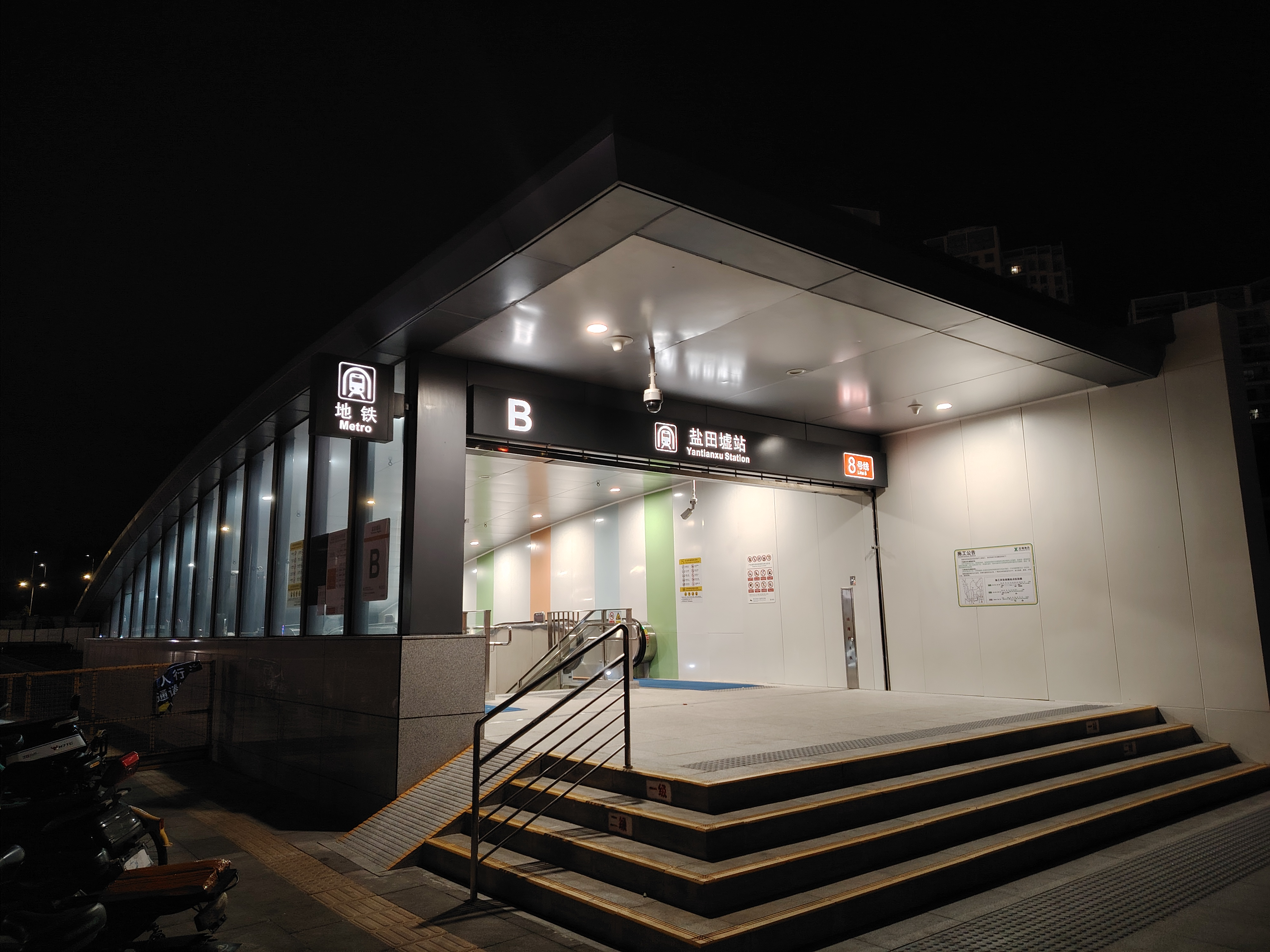
Entrance B

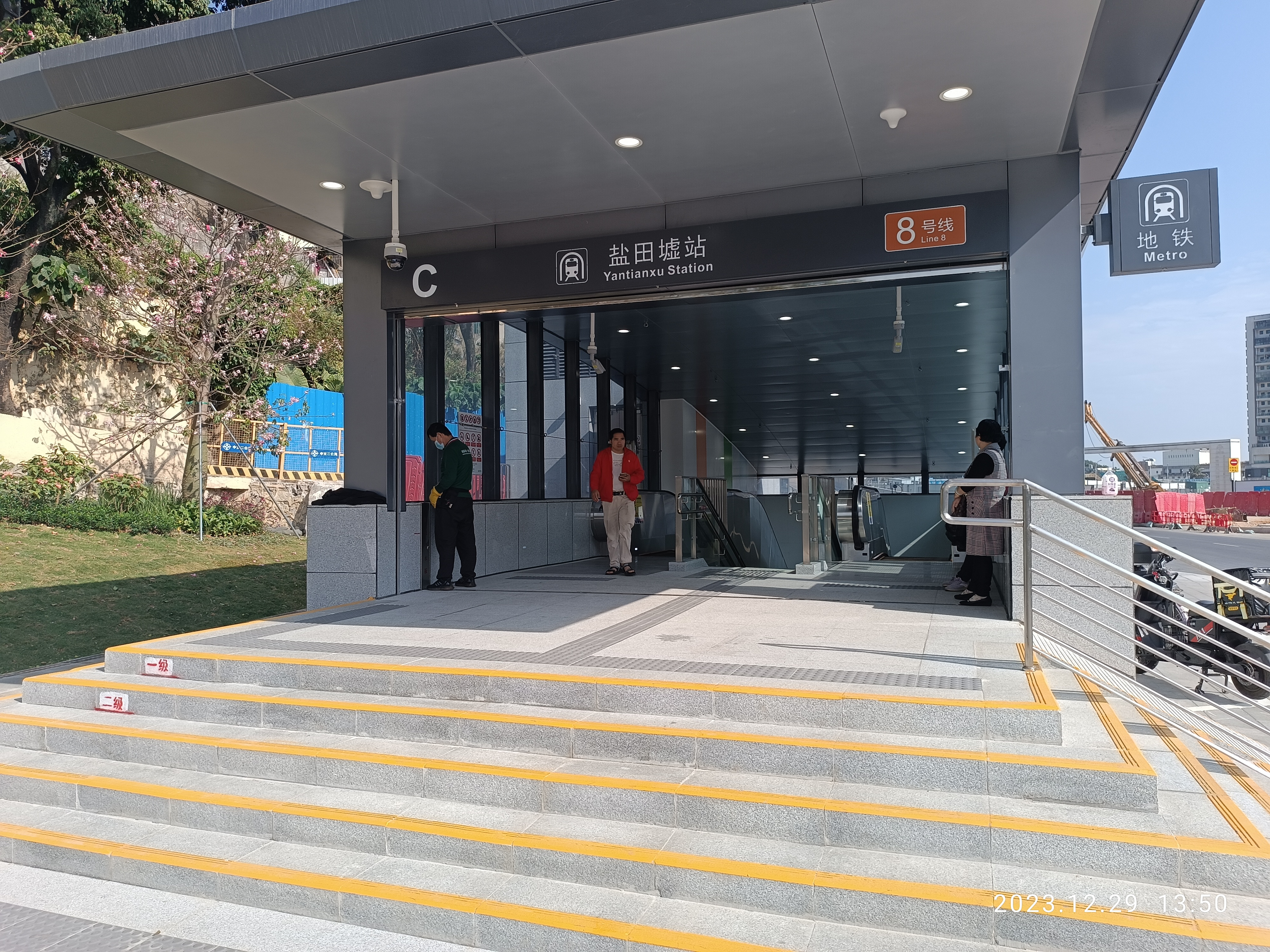
Entrance C
