= Dameisha station =

Shenzhen Metro Line 8 station

Dameisha 大梅沙
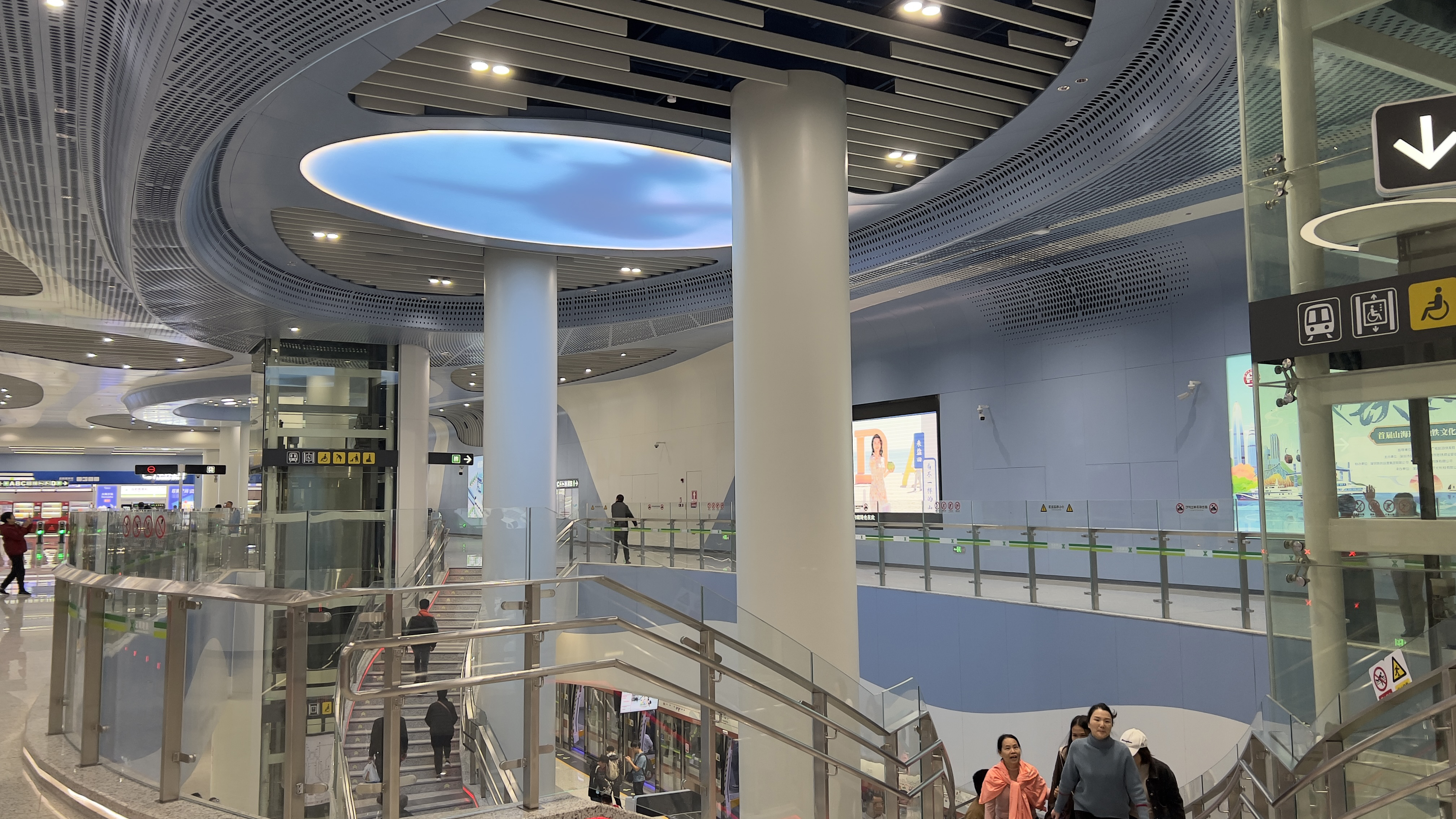
- Concourse

Chinese name
- Chinese: 大梅沙
Transcriptions
Standard Mandarin
- Hanyu Pinyin: Dàméishā
Yue: Cantonese
- Yale Romanization: Daaihmùihsā
- Jyutping: Daai6mui4saa1

General information
- Location: Under the tunnel of Yanmei Road (盐梅路) at Dameisha Beach; Yantian District, Shenzhen, Guangdong; China
- Coordinates: 22°35′49.16″N 114°18′10.91″E
- Operated by: SZMC (Shenzhen Metro Group)
- Line: Line 8
- Platforms: 2 (1 island platform)
- Tracks: 2

Construction
- Structure type: Underground
- Accessible: Yes

History
- Opened: 27 December 2023 (2 years ago)

Services
Preceding station	Shenzhen Metro	Following station
Yantianxu towards Liantang (Line 2: Chiwan)	Line 8	Xiaomeisha towards Xichong
Location

Dameisha station (Chinese: 大梅沙; pinyin: Dàméishā; Jyutping: Daai6mui4saa1; Cantonese Yale: Daaihmùihsā) is a metro station on Line 8 of Shenzhen Metro. It opened on December 27, 2023, with the Phase 2 extension of the line to Xiaomeisha. It serves Dameisha Beach, one of the largest beaches in Shenzhen and a major tourist attraction.

== Station layout ==
The station has an island platform under Yanmei Road at Dameisha Beach.

G	–	Exits A-D
B1F	-	Yanmei Road Dameisha Tunnel
B2F; Concourse	Lobby	Ticket Machines, Customer Service
B3F; Platforms		2 towards Chiwan (Yantianxu)
B3F; Platforms	Island platform, doors will open on the left
B3F; Platforms		8 towards Xichong (Xiaomeisha)

=== Entrances/exits ===
The station has 4 points of entry/exit, with Exits B, C and D being accessible via elevators.

- A: Yanmei Road, Dameisha Beach
- B: Yanmei Road, Dameisha Beach, Yalan Hotel, Dameisha International Water Sports Center
- C: Yanmei Road, Dameisha Beach, Yalan Hotel, Dameisha Outlets, Meisha Police Station, OCT East
- D: Yanmei Road, Dameisha Seaview Hotel, Vanke International Conference Center (Vanke Headquarters),
  Vanke Meisha Academy, InterContinental Shenzhen Dameisha Resort
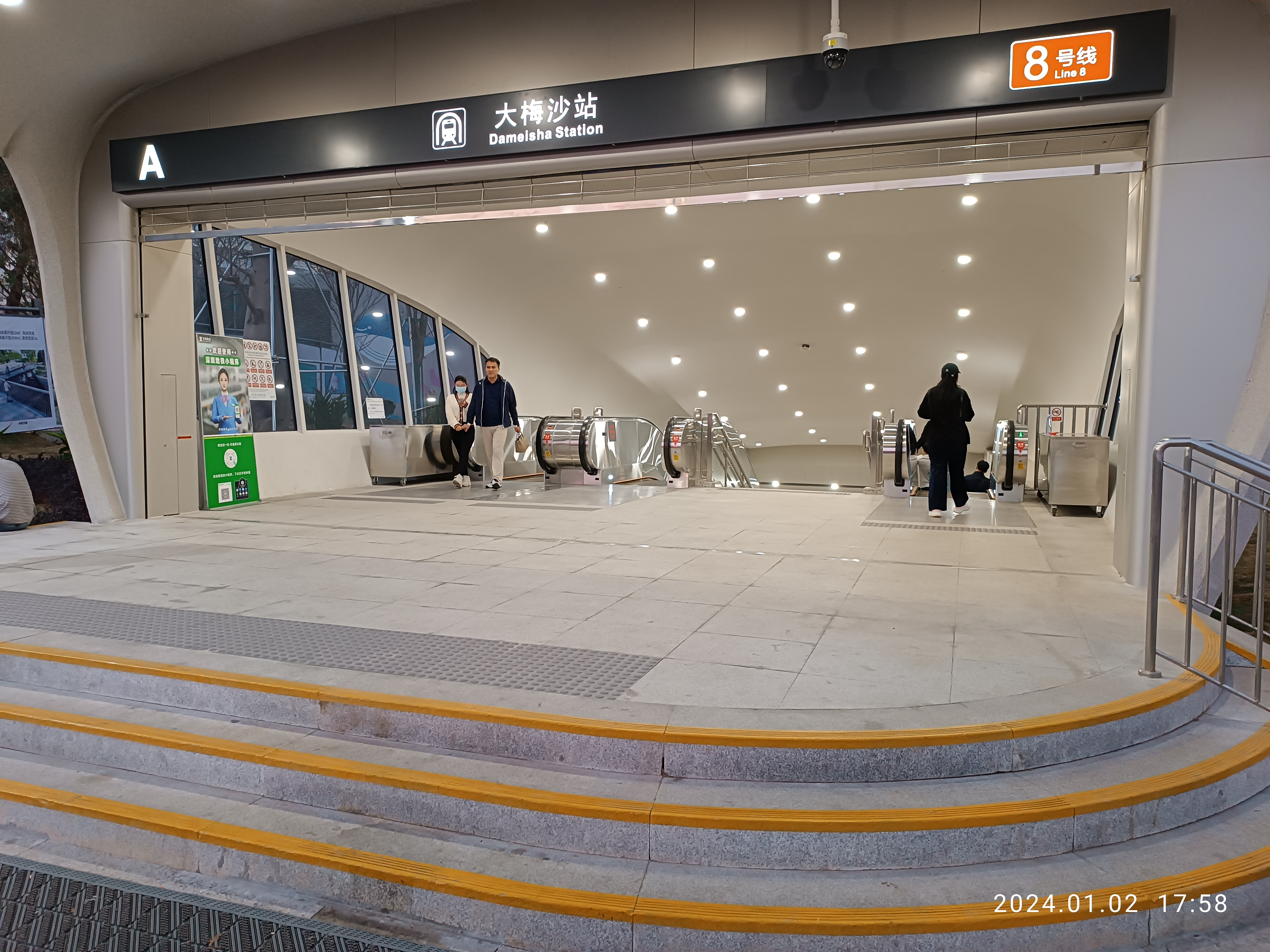
Entrance A

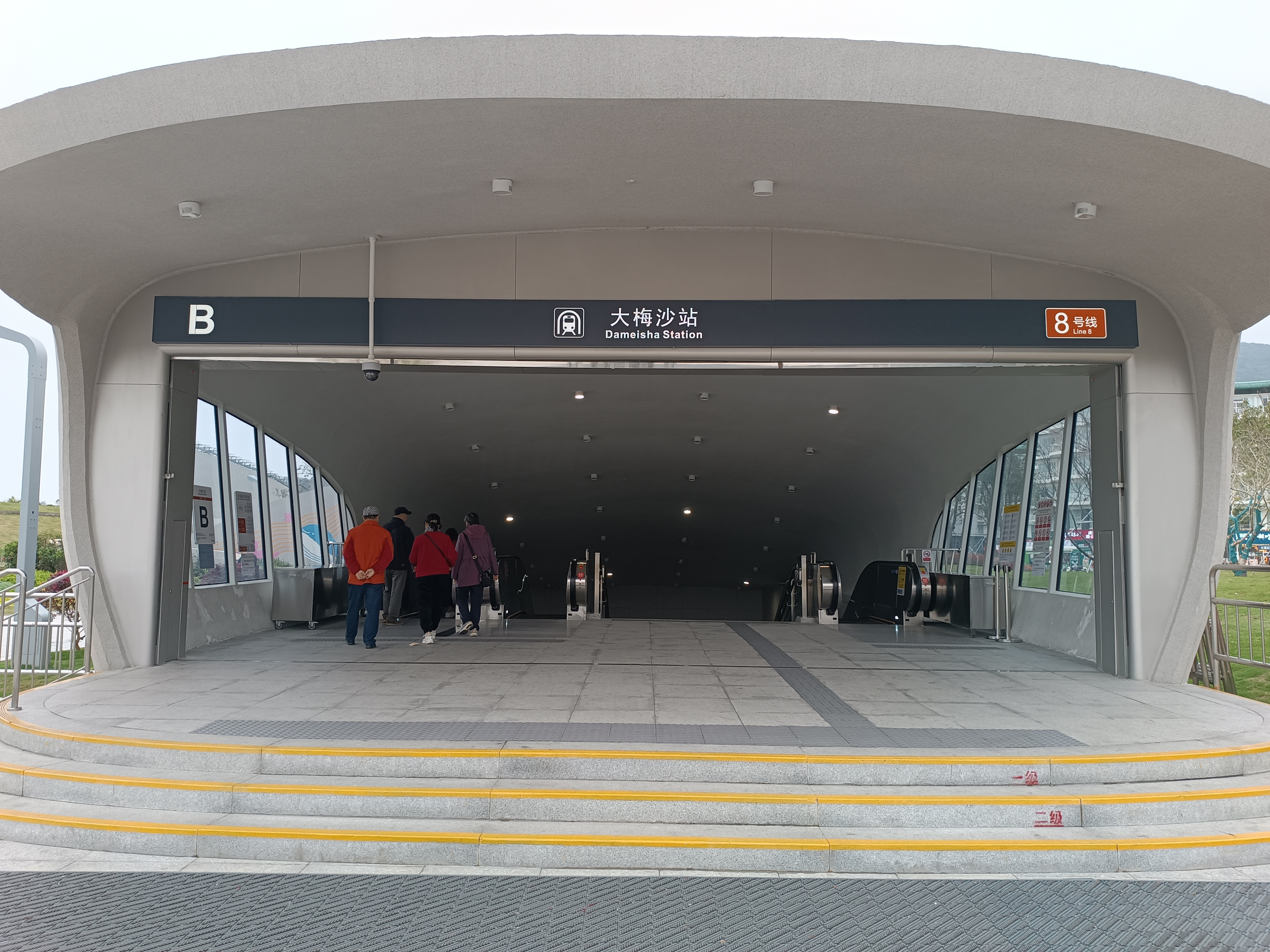
Entrance B

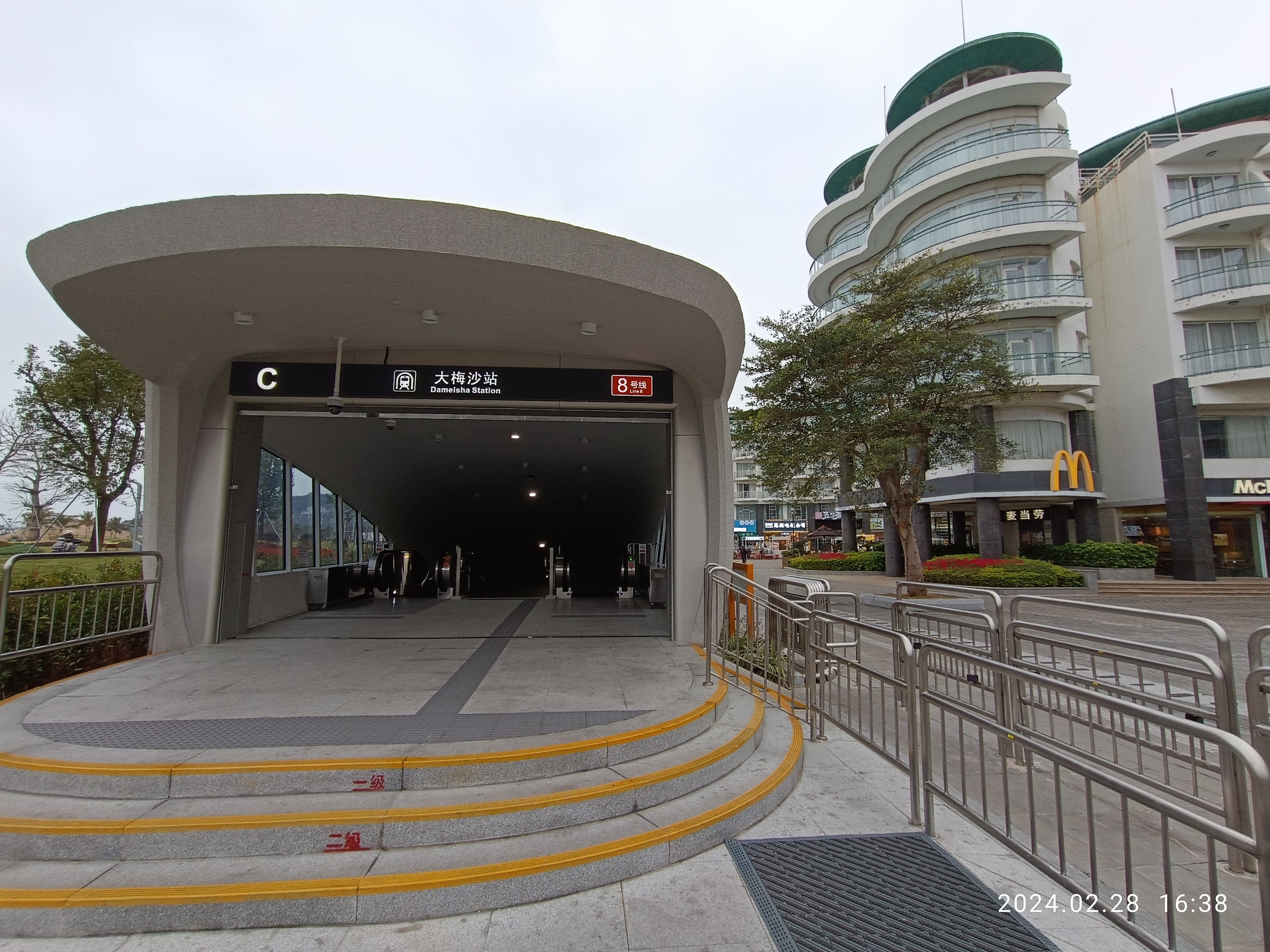
Entrance C

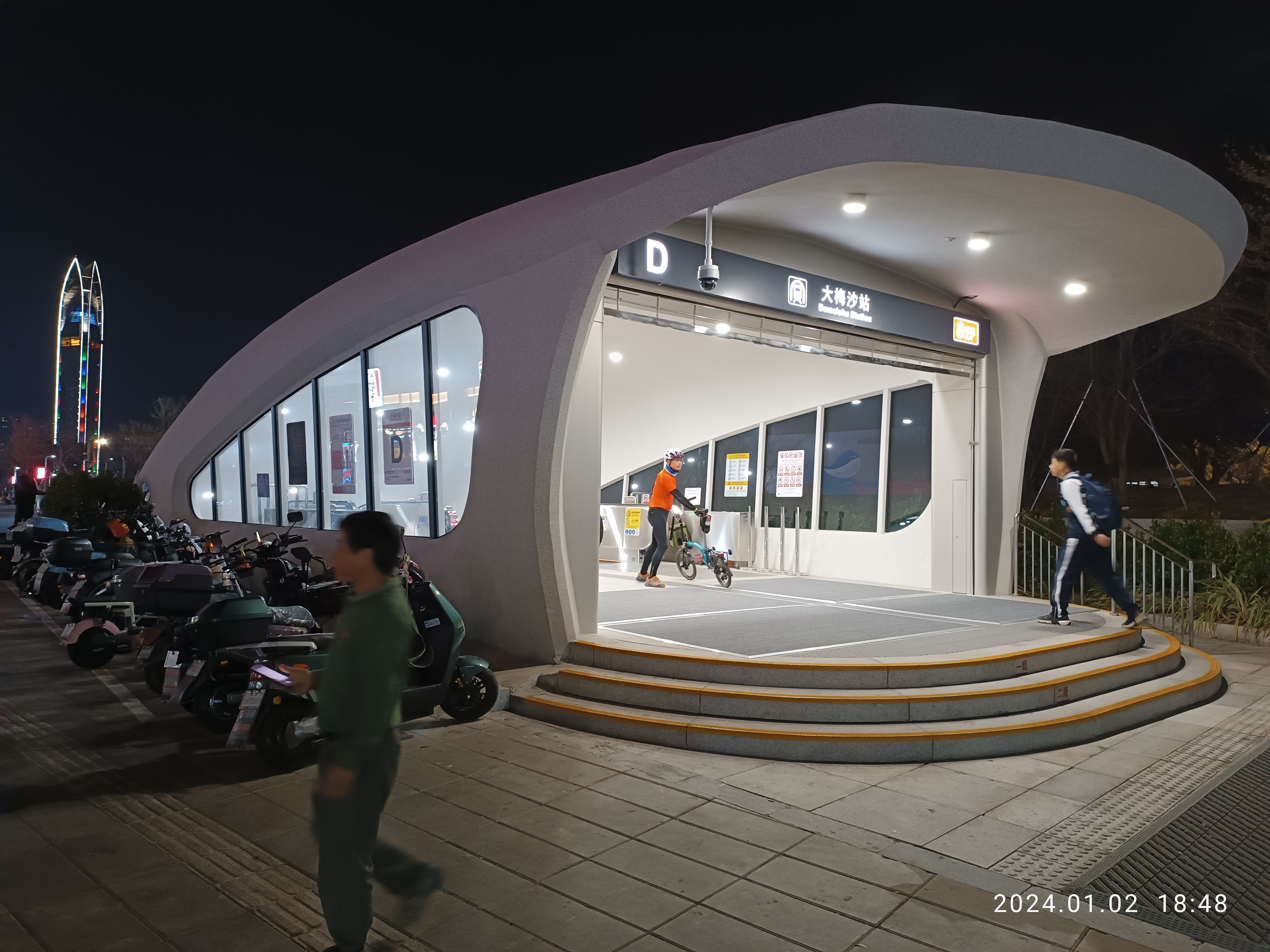
Entrance D
