= Line 32 (Shenzhen Metro) =

Future Shenzhen Metro line

- 32

Overview
- Status: Under construction
- Locale: Shenzhen, Guangdong
- Termini: Xichong; Kuichong East
- Stations: 5

Service
- Type: Rapid transit
- System: Shenzhen Metro
- Services: 1
- Operator: SZMC (Shenzhen Metro Group)

History
- Planned opening: 2028; 2 years' time

Technical
- Line length: 9.5km
- Character: Underground
- Operating speed: 80km/h

Line 32 of the Shenzhen Metro is a line under construction, which will run entirely in Dapeng New District from Xichong at the terminus of Line 8 to Kuichong East for approximately 9.5 kilometers. Construction began on 8 May 2024, and the line is expected to open in 2028.

== Stations (Phase 1) ==
Station name		Connections	Location
English	Chinese	Connections	Location
through train to Shenwai Senior Campus via Line 8
Xichong	溪涌	8 (through service)	Dapeng New District
Shandong	上洞		Dapeng New District
Tuyang	土洋		Dapeng New District
Kuichong	葵涌		Dapeng New District
Kuichong East	葵涌东		Dapeng New District

== History & Route Alignment Schemes ==
Line 32 first appeared in the "Shenzhen Metro Masterplan (2016-2030)" announced on 29 December 2016. In the plan, the line starts from Xiaomeisha station, turns south at Kuichong, passes through Dapeng, Nan'ao and other places before ending at Xinda station, with a total length of 29.4 kilometers. The initial plan is expected to use BYD cloud rail technology to build a straddle monorail line.

On 6 April 2021, construction of the third phase of Line 8 was implemented, extending from Xiaomeisha eastward to Xichong. The starting point of Line 32 was also changed to Xichong station. At the same time, the Shenzhen-Huizhou Intercity Railway has also added a Dapeng branch line with its terminal at Xinda station, which to a certain extent replaced the Kuichong-Xinda section of the line; this line has also been changed to a horizontal connection line and the distance has been greatly reduced.

On 26 August 2022, the "Shenzhen Metro Phase V Expansion Plan (2023-2028)" was officially announced, and Line 32 has been included in it. There are 2 schemes. Both schemes will start at Xichong and end at Kuichong East. The full underground scheme has a total length of about 9.4 kilometers and 3 stations. The total length of the elevated scheme is about 9.5 kilometers, and there are 5 stations. Except for Xichong station, the others are elevated stations.

On 31 October 2023, the Shenzhen Municipal Bureau of Planning and Natural Resources announced the final announcement of the "Shenzhen Rail Transit Line 32 Transportation Detailed Plan (Xichong to Kwai Chung East Section)" (draft). From west to east, it is laid along the main roads such as Yanba Expressway, Kuichong Road and Yan'an Road, with a length of about 9.5 kilometers and 3 stations: Shandong Station, Kuichong Station and Kuichong East Station. The whole line is underground. It shares the Xichong depot, which is under construction with Line 8. The address of the depot is located in the Xichong area, on the north side of the Yanba Expressway, with a land area of about 16 hectares. On 13 March 2024, Tuyang Station was added between Shandong and Kuichong stations.
