= Shenwai Senior Campus station =

Metro station in Shenzhen, Guangdong, China

Shenwai Senior Campus 深外高中
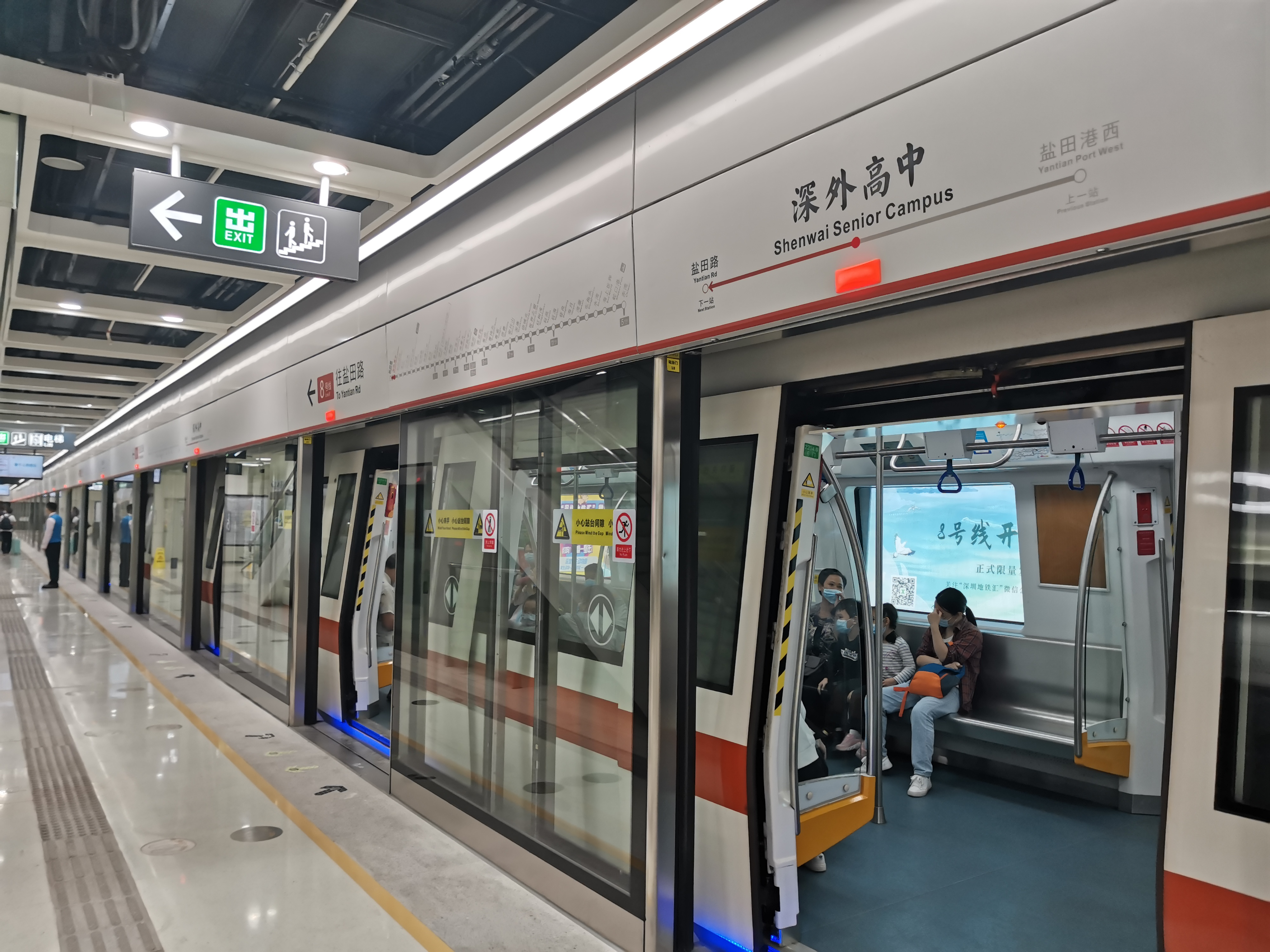
- Platform

Chinese name
- Chinese: 深外高中站
Transcriptions
Standard Mandarin
- Hanyu Pinyin: Shēnwàigāozhōng Zhàn

General information
- Location: Zhongqing Road (中青路); Yantian Subdistrict, Yantian District, Shenzhen, Guangdong; China
- Coordinates: 22°35′11″N 114°14′22″E
- Operator: Shenzhen Metro Group
- Line: Line 8
- Platforms: 2 (1 island platform)
- Tracks: 2

Construction
- Structure type: Underground
- Accessible: Yes

History
- Opened: 28 October 2020

Services
Preceding station	Shenzhen Metro	Following station
Yantian Port West towards Liantang (Line 2: Chiwan)	Line 8	Yantian Road towards Xichong
Location

Shenwai Senior Campus (Chinese: 深外高中) is a station on Line 8 of the Shenzhen Metro. It opened on 28 October 2020.

== Station layout ==
G	Street level	Exit
B1F; Concourse	Lobby	Customer Service, Shops, Vending machines, ATMs
B2F; Platforms	Platform	← Line 8 towards Chiwan (Yantian Port West)
B2F; Platforms	Island platform, doors will open on the left
B2F; Platforms	Platform	Line 8 towards Xichong (Yantian Road) →

== Entrances/exits ==
- A: East side of Zhongqing 1st Road, SHENZHEN FOREIGN LANGUAGES SCHOOL (GROUP), Haitong Ju
- B1: South side of Wutongshan Blvd (W)
- B2: South side of Wutongshan Blvd (E)
- C: West side of Zhongqing 1st Road, Haitong Community Party Masses Service Center, Yunhai School, Shenzhen Yantian Zhonghai Kindergarten, Wangjihu Stabling Yard of Shenzhen Metro
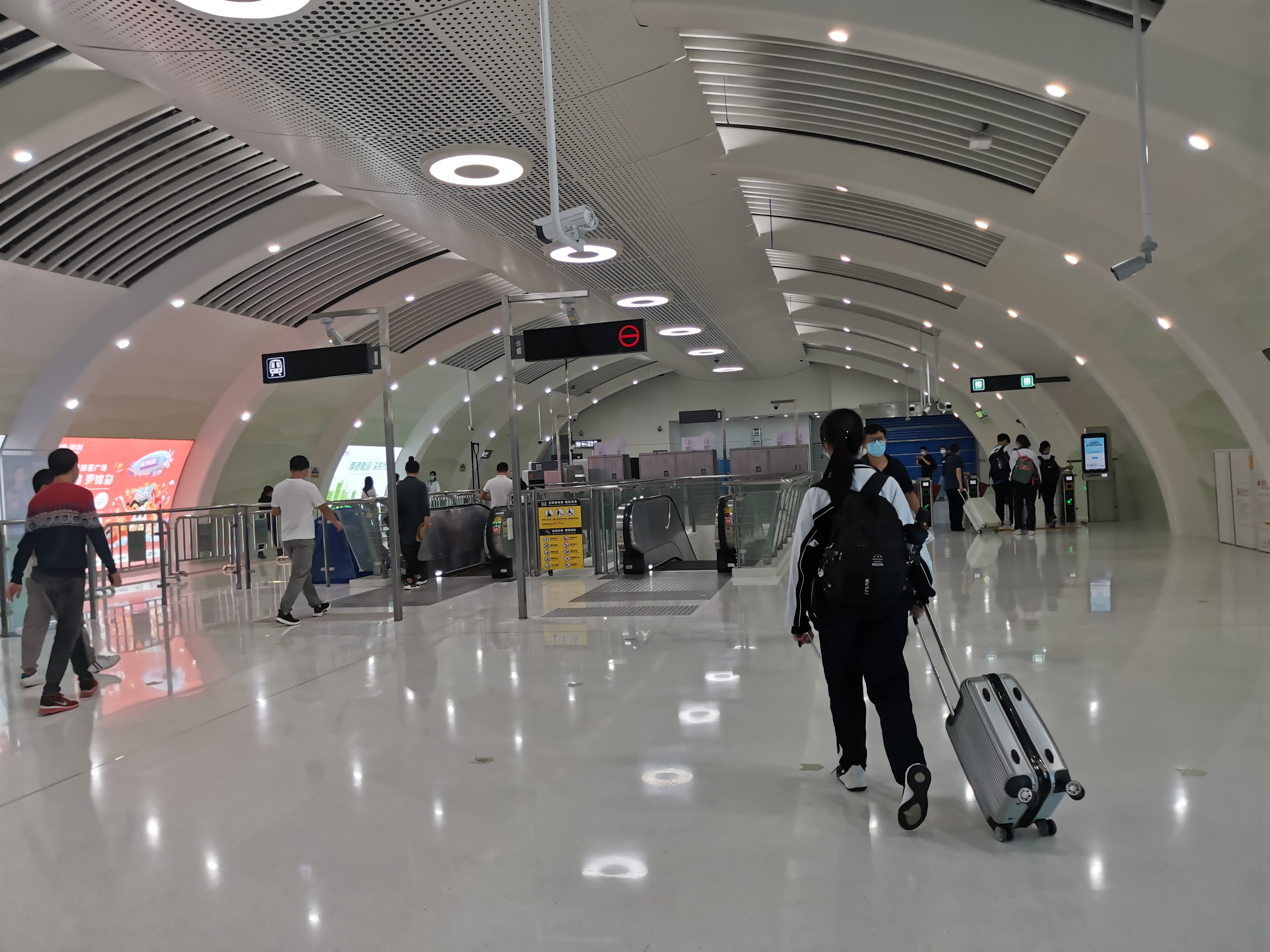
Concourse

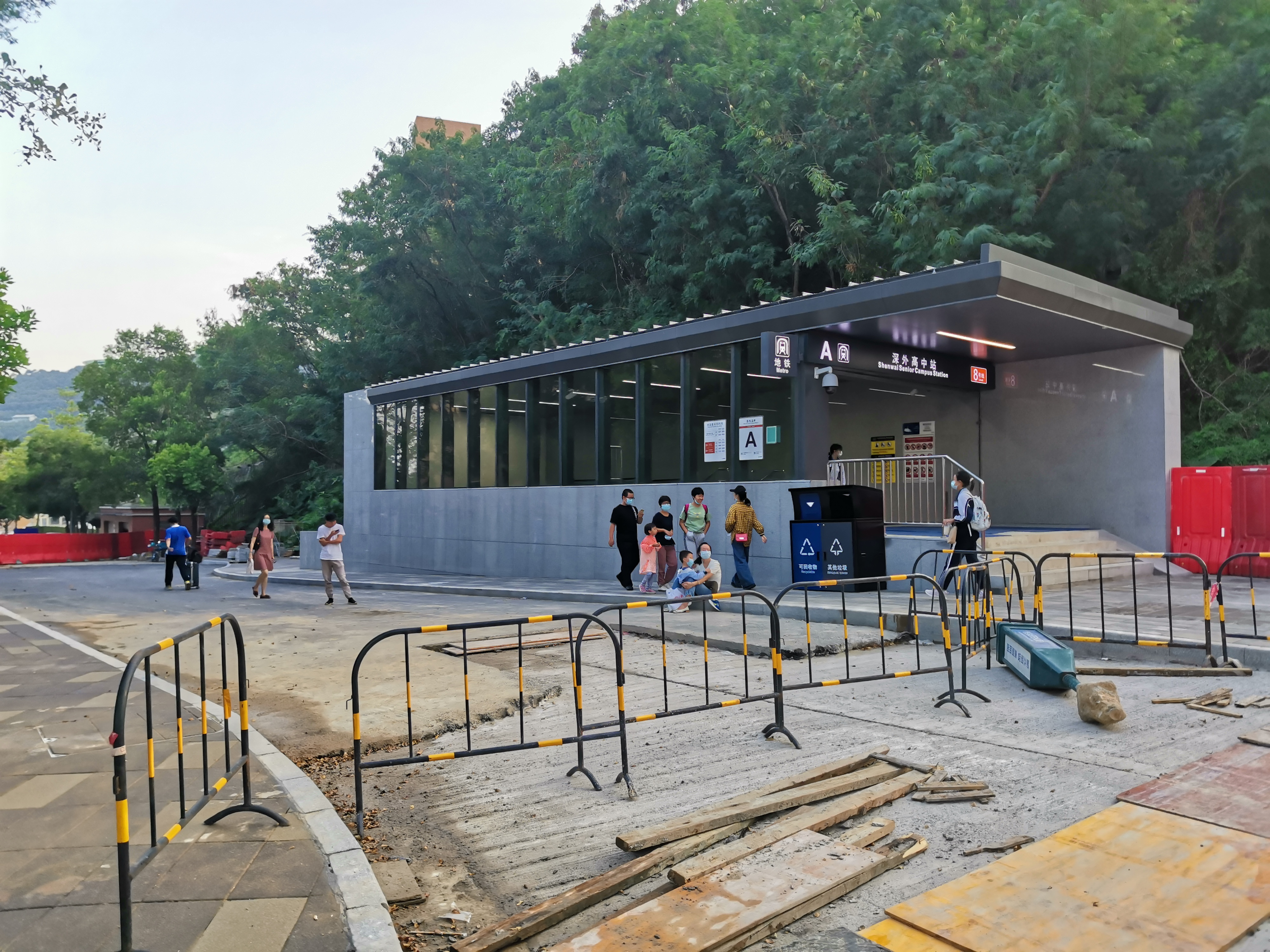
Exit A

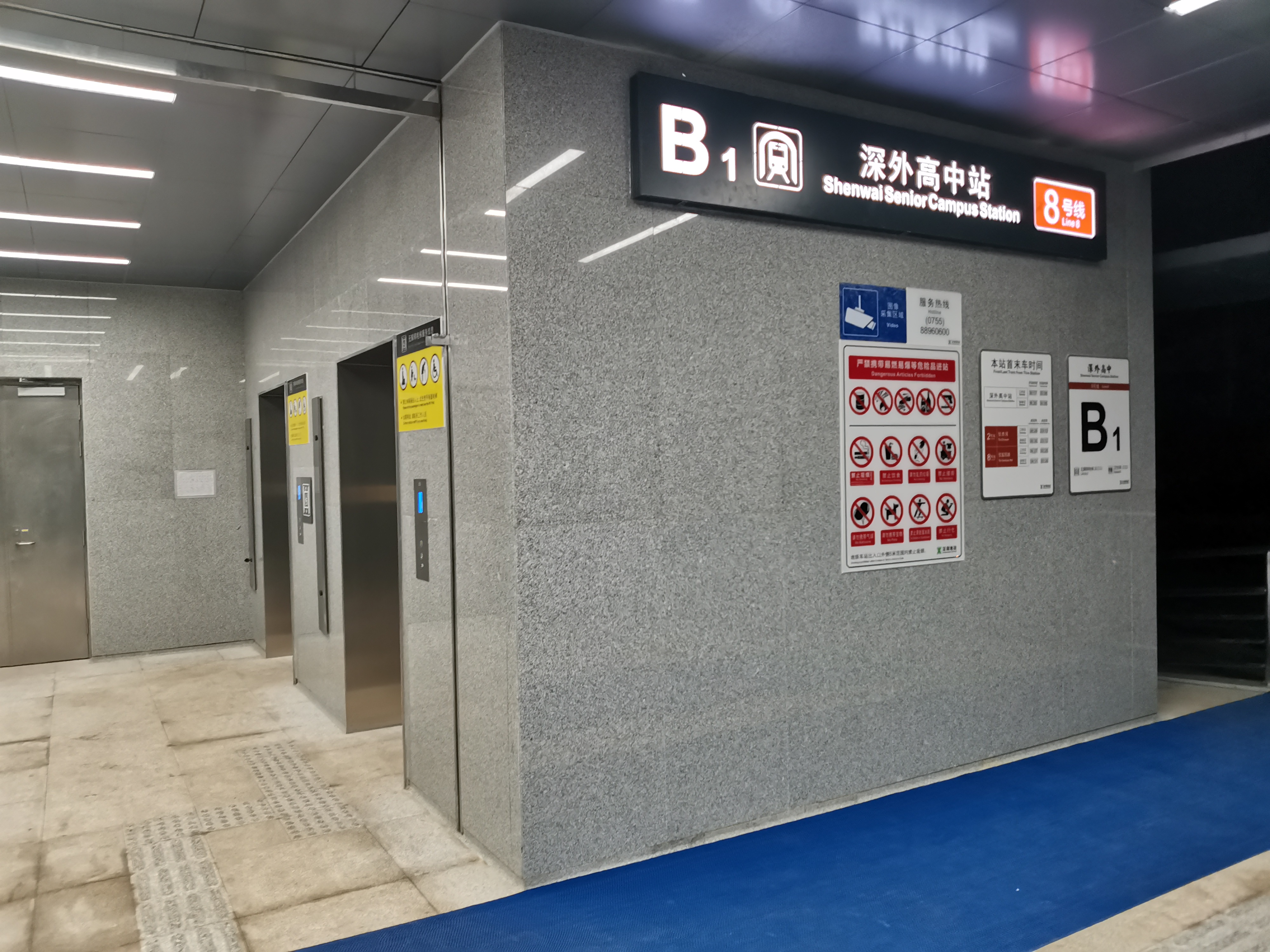
Exit B1

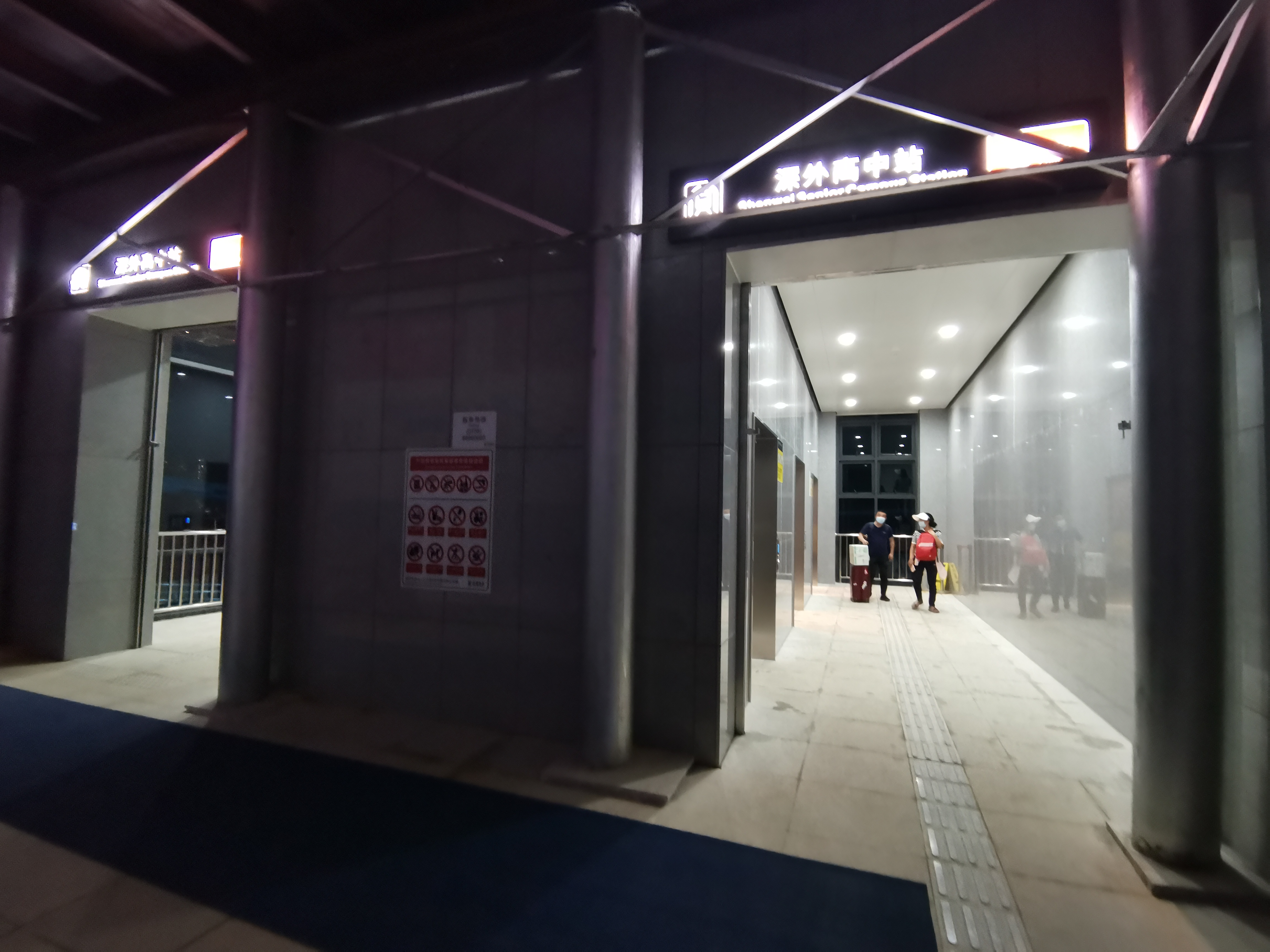
Exit C
