= Line 8 (Shenzhen Metro) =

Metro line in Shenzhen, China

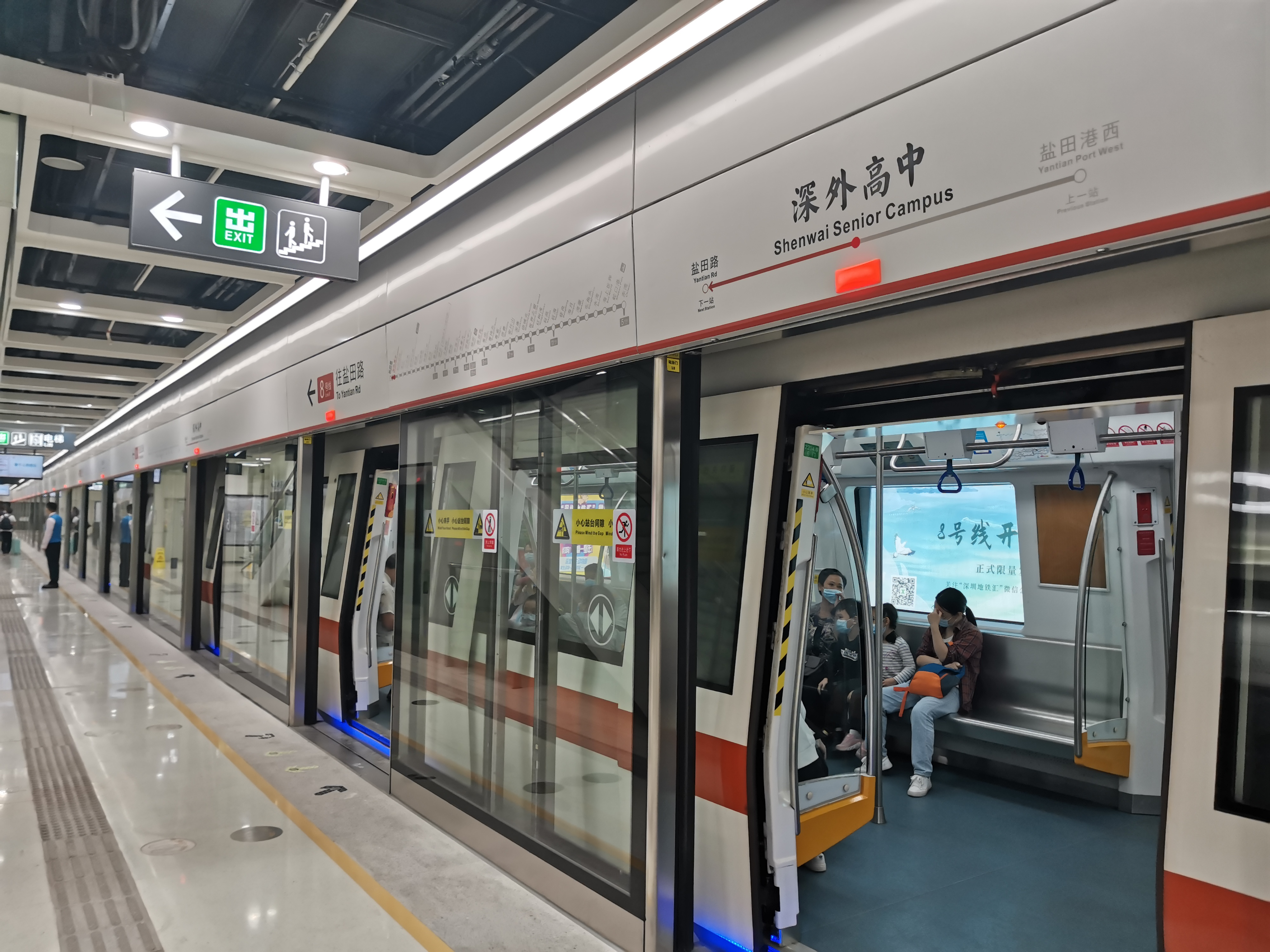
- Shenwai Senior Campus station

Overview
- Status: Operational
- Locale: Shenzhen, China
- Termini: Liantang; Xichong
- Stations: 12
- Color on map: Dark Orange (#db6d1c)

Service
- Type: Rapid transit
- System: Shenzhen Metro
- Operator: SZMC (Shenzhen Metro Group)
- Depot: Wangji Lake stabling yard
- Rolling stock: Trains service in Line 2 CRRC Zhuzhou (258–281[801–824]) (6A)

History
- Opened: 28 October 2020; 5 years ago

Technical
- Line length: 24.33 km (15.1 mi)
- Number of tracks: Double-track
- Character: Underground
- Track gauge: 1,435 mm (4 ft 8 1/2 in) standard gauge
- Electrification: 1,500 V DC (Overhead lines)
- Operating speed: 80 km/h (50 mph)
- Signalling: Urbalis 888 CBTC Moving block

Line 8 of the Shenzhen Metro (also known as the Yantian line) is an East-West line with 12 stations from Liantang to Xichong. It opened on 28 October 2020 between Liantang and Yantian Road, with a length of 12.367 km (7.7 mi) and a total of 7 stations. Line 8 is the first line to serve Yantian District. Line 8 merges into Line 2 at Liantang station, with trains on Line 8 continuing service to Chiwan station.

Phase 2 opened on 27 December 2023, which extended the line from Yantian Road to Xiaomeisha.

Phase 3 opened on 28 December 2025, which extended the line from Xiaomeisha to Xichong.

== Timeline ==
Segment	Commencement	Length	Station(s)	Name
Liantang — Yantian Road	28 October 2020	12.367 km (7.68 mi)	7	Phase 1
Yantian Road — Xiaomeisha	27 December 2023	7.96 km (4.95 mi)	4	Phase 2
Xiaomeisha — Xichong	28 December 2025	3.69 km (2.29 mi)	1	Phase 3

== Service routes ==
- Chiwan — Xichong (trains are through service with Line 2 after Liantang)

== Stations ==
Service routes	Station name		Connections	Nearby bus stops	Distance		Location
Service routes	English	Chinese	Connections	Nearby bus stops	Distance		Location
through train to Chiwan via Line 2
●	Liantang	莲塘	2 (through service)	27 57 113 381 B621 B625 M207 M468	0	0	Luohu
●	Wutong Mountain South	梧桐山南		27 57 69 85 111 113 308 M103 M133 M191 M199 M205 M207 M364 M437 M468 M520 M555	1.46	1.46	Luohu
●	Shatoujiao	沙头角		68 85 308 B619 M199 M205 M437 M520	4.32	5.78	Yantian
●	Haishan	海山		68 85 308 358 308-Fast（358快线）E26 M191 M196 M199 M205 M288 M362 M437 M444 M520	1.57	7.35	Yantian
●	Yantian Port West	盐田港西		68 308 358 308-Fast（358快线）E26 M191 M196 M199 M205 M288 M362 M437 M444 M520	1.24	8.59	Yantian
●	Shenwai Senior Campus	深外高中		B925 C4 M348 M444 M465	2.68	11.27	Yantian
●	Yantian Road	盐田路		68 85 358 B676 B925 B927 M205 M205X（M205大站快车）M348 M380 M444 Dameisha-holiday-express-1（大梅沙假日专线1）	1.41	12.68	Yantian
●	Hong'anwei	洪安围			1.10	13.78	Yantian
●	Yantianxu	盐田墟			1.14	14.92	Yantian
●	Dameisha	大梅沙			3.58	18.50	Yantian
●	Xiaomeisha	小梅沙			2.14	20.64	Yantian
●	Xichong	溪涌	32 (through service)		3.69	24.33	Dapeng
planned through train to Kuichong East via Line 32 (from Shenwai Senior Campus only)

== Rolling stock ==
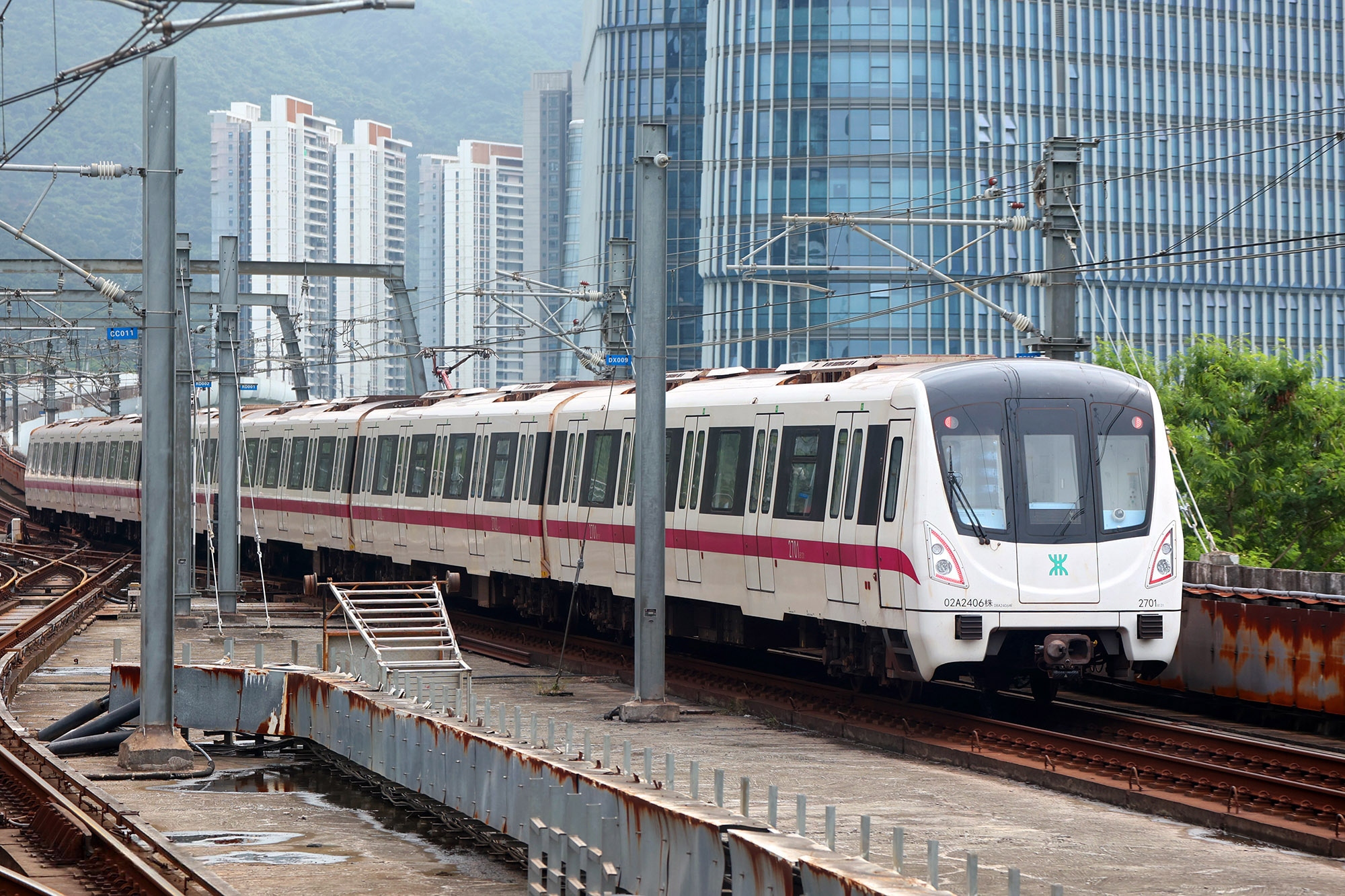
Line 8 train

Type	Date of manufacture	Series	Sets	Serial number	Assembly	Notes
Type A	2019–2020	Type A stock	24	258–281 (801-824)	Tc+Mp+M+M+Mp+Tc	Manufactured by CRRC Zhuzhou Electric Locomotive Works
