= Xiaomeisha station =

Shenzhen Metro Line 8 station

Xiaomeisha 小梅沙
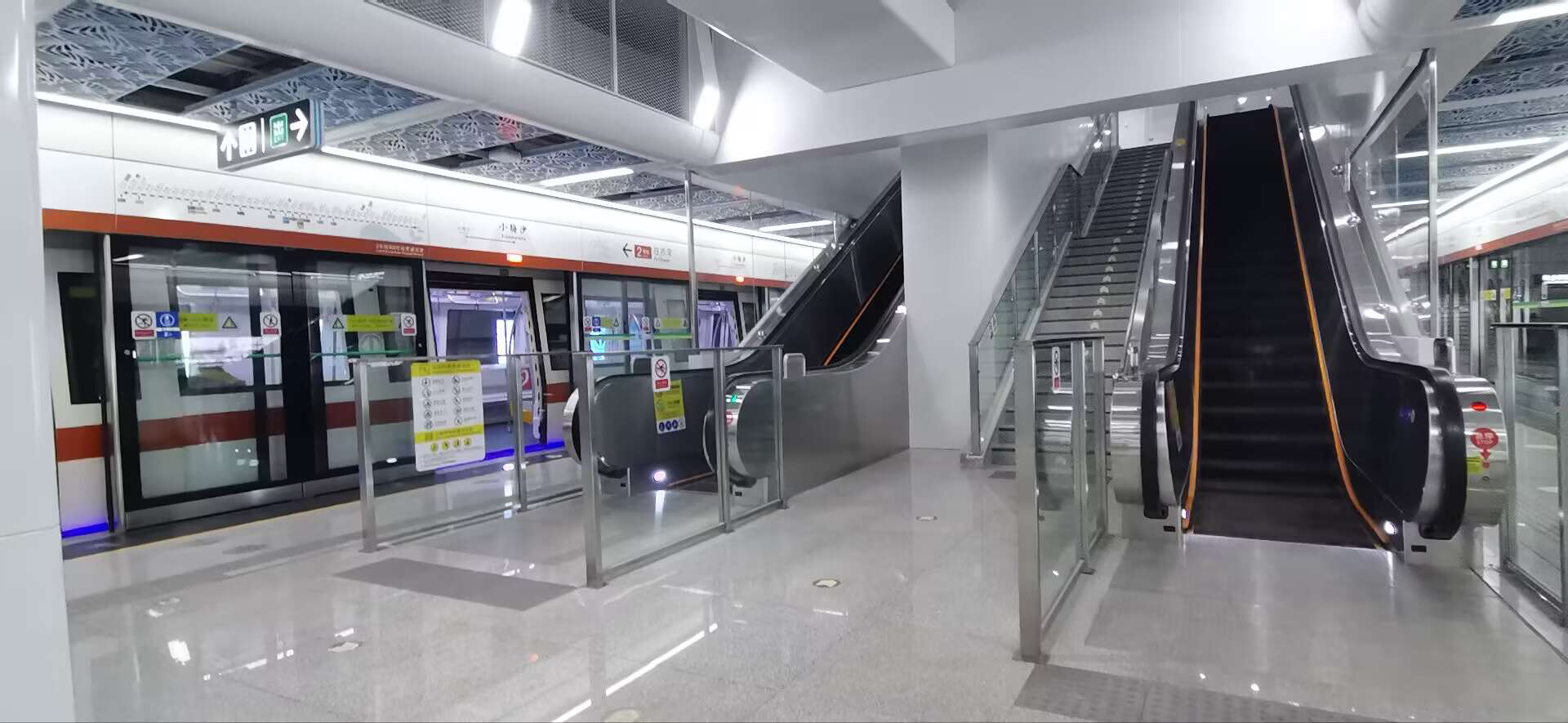
- Platform

Chinese name
- Chinese: 小梅沙
Transcriptions
Standard Mandarin
- Hanyu Pinyin: Xiǎoméishā
Yue: Cantonese
- Yale Romanization: Síumùihsā
- Jyutping: Siu2mui4saa1

General information
- Location: Yanmei Road (盐梅路); Yantian District, Shenzhen, Guangdong; China
- Coordinates: 22°36′16.13″N 114°19′15.89″E
- Operated by: SZMC (Shenzhen Metro Group)
- Line: Line 8
- Platforms: 2 (1 island platform)
- Tracks: 2

Construction
- Structure type: Underground
- Accessible: Yes

History
- Opened: 27 December 2023 (2 years ago)

Services
Preceding station	Shenzhen Metro	Following station
Dameisha towards Liantang (Line 2: Chiwan)	Line 8	Xichong Terminus
Location

Xiaomeisha station (Chinese: 小梅沙; pinyin: Xiǎoméishā; Jyutping: Siu2mui4saa1; Cantonese Yale: Síumùihsā) is a metro station on Line 8 of Shenzhen Metro. It opened on December 27, 2023, with the Phase 2 extension of the line to Xiaomeisha. It serves Xiaomeisha Beach, the lesser but more premium version of Dameisha Beach. It was the eastern terminus of the line until Xichong opened on 28 December 2025.

== Station layout ==
The station has an island platform under Yanmei Road.

G	–	Exits A-D
B1F; Concourse	Lobby	Ticket Machines, Customer Service
B2F; Platforms		2 towards Chiwan (Dameisha)
B2F; Platforms	Island platform, doors will open on the left
B2F; Platforms		8 towards Xichong (terminus)

=== Entrances/exits ===
The station has 4 points of entry/exit, with only Exits A and C currently open. All exits are accessible via elevators.

- A: Yanmei Road, Xiaomeisha, Xiaomeisha New Residence
- ~~B~~: (not open)
- C: Yanmei Road, Xiaomeisha
- ~~D~~: (not open)
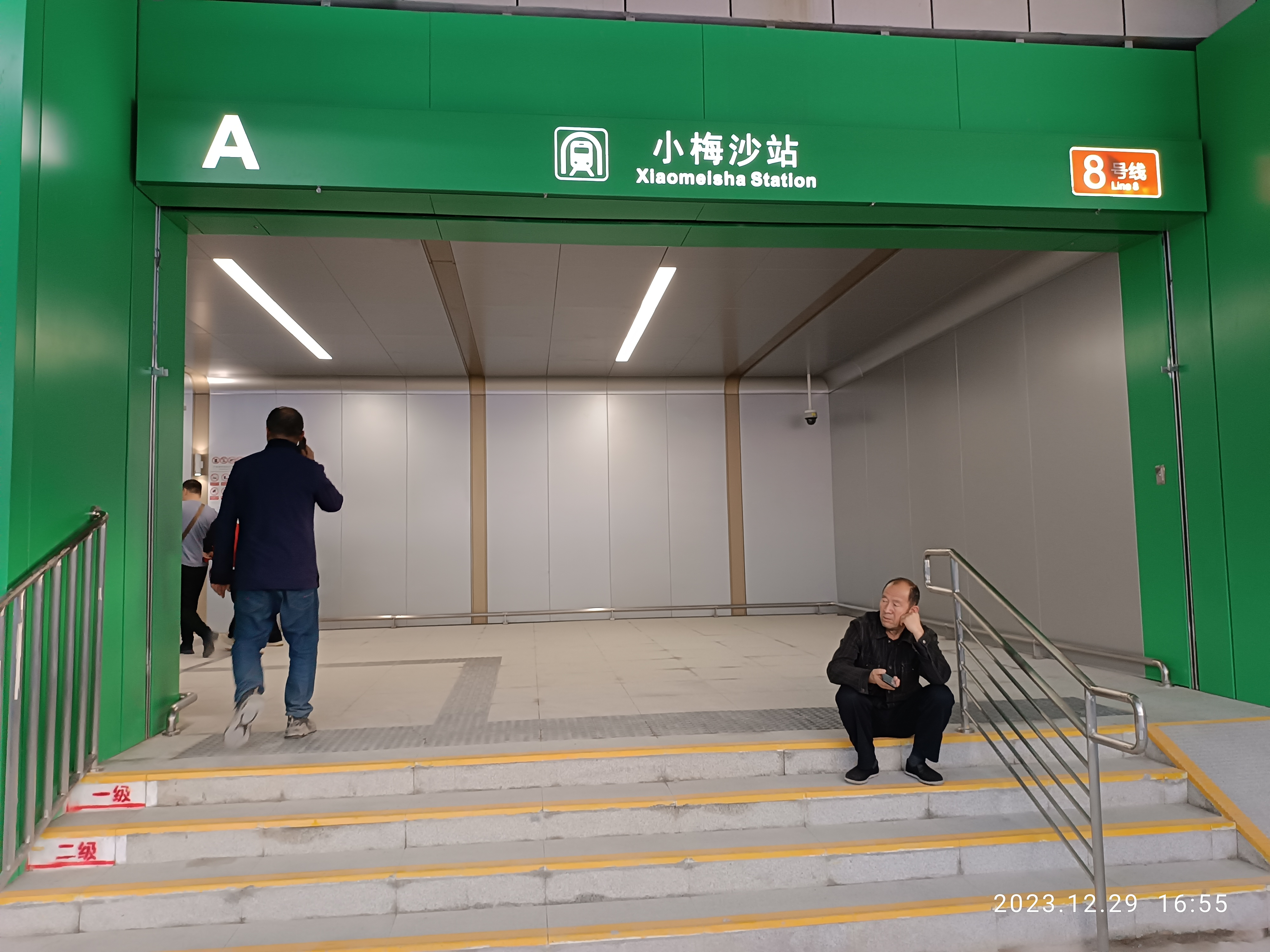
Entrance A

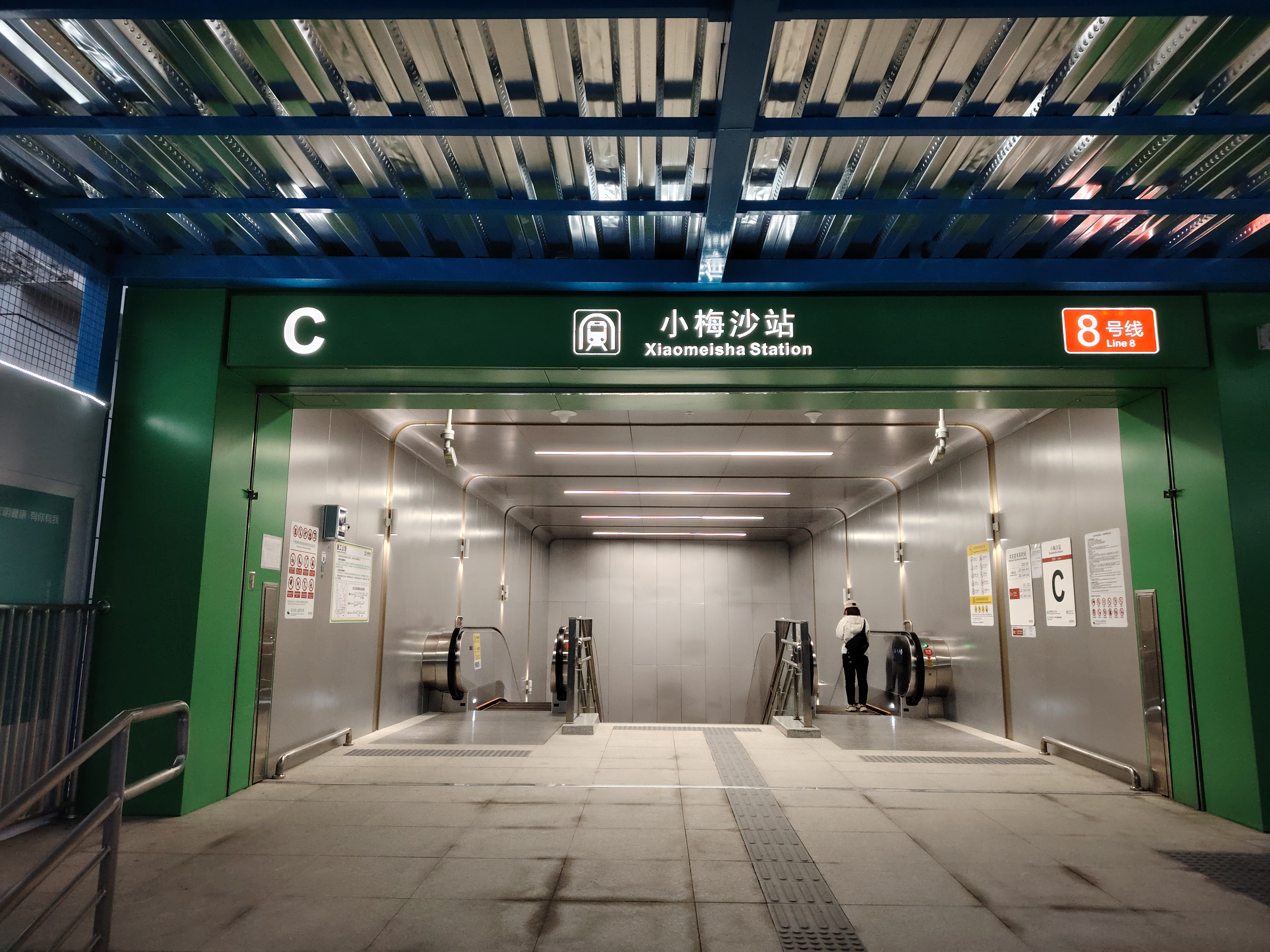
Entrance C access point

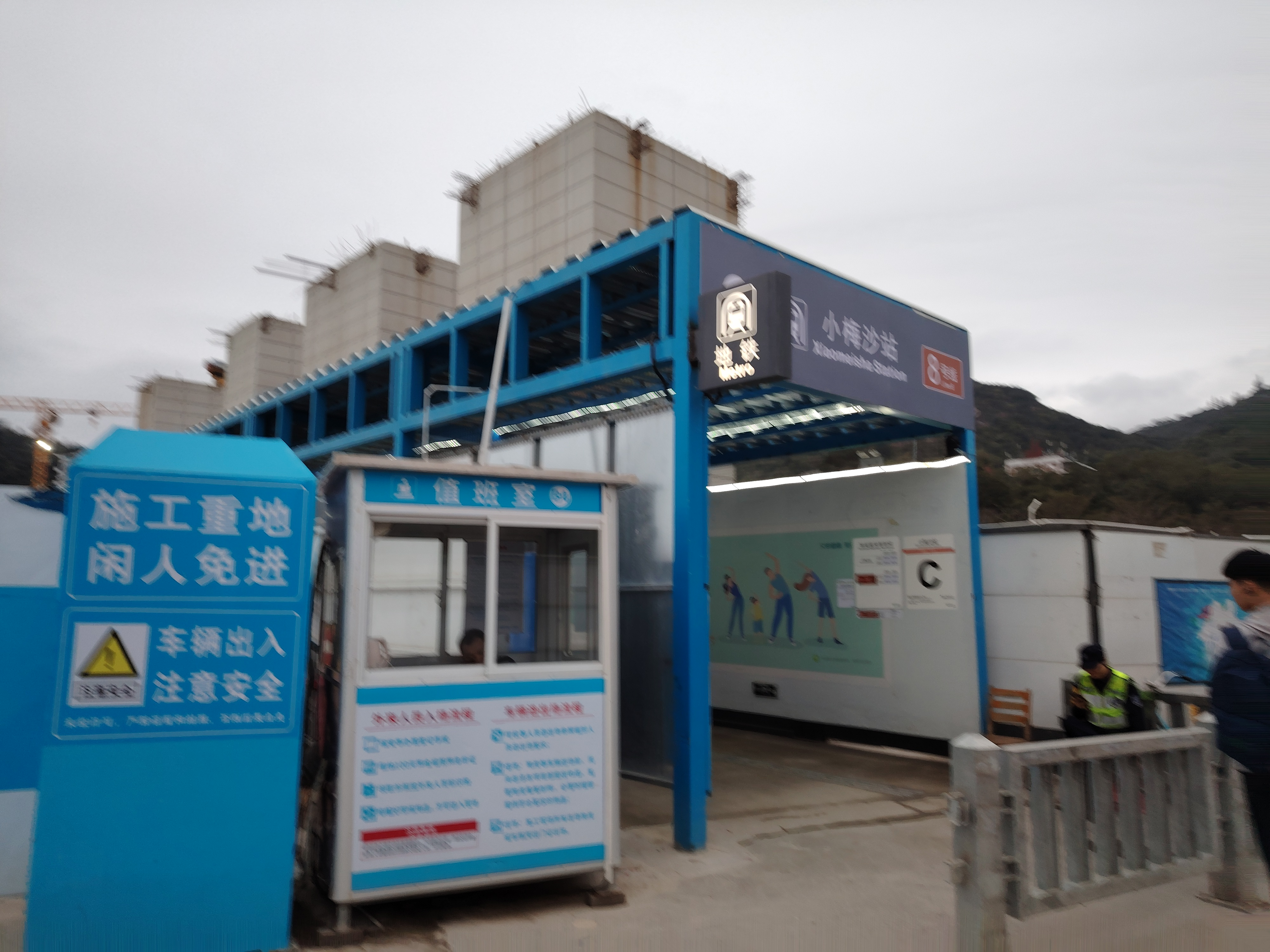
Entrance C

== Gallery ==
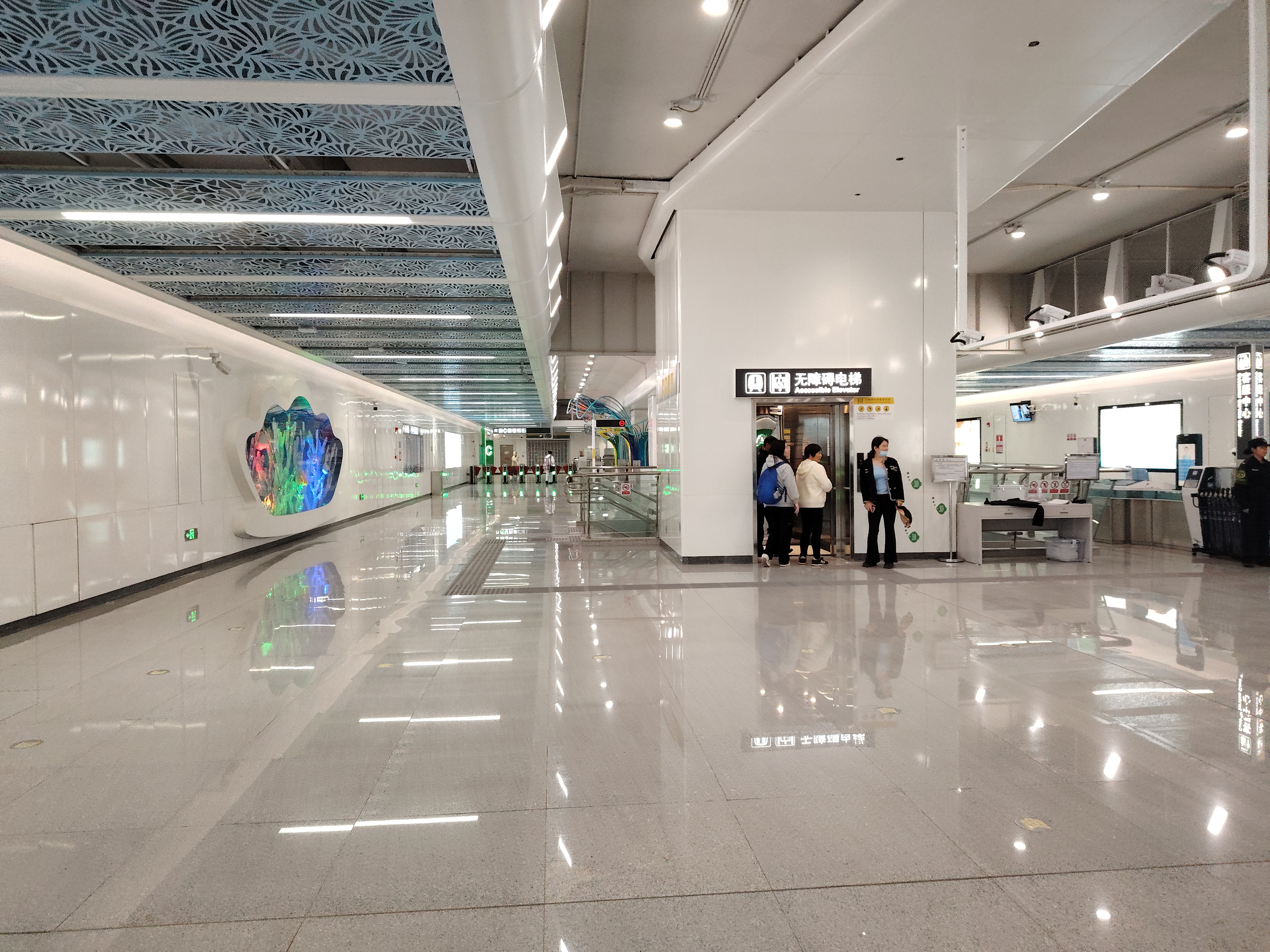
Concourse

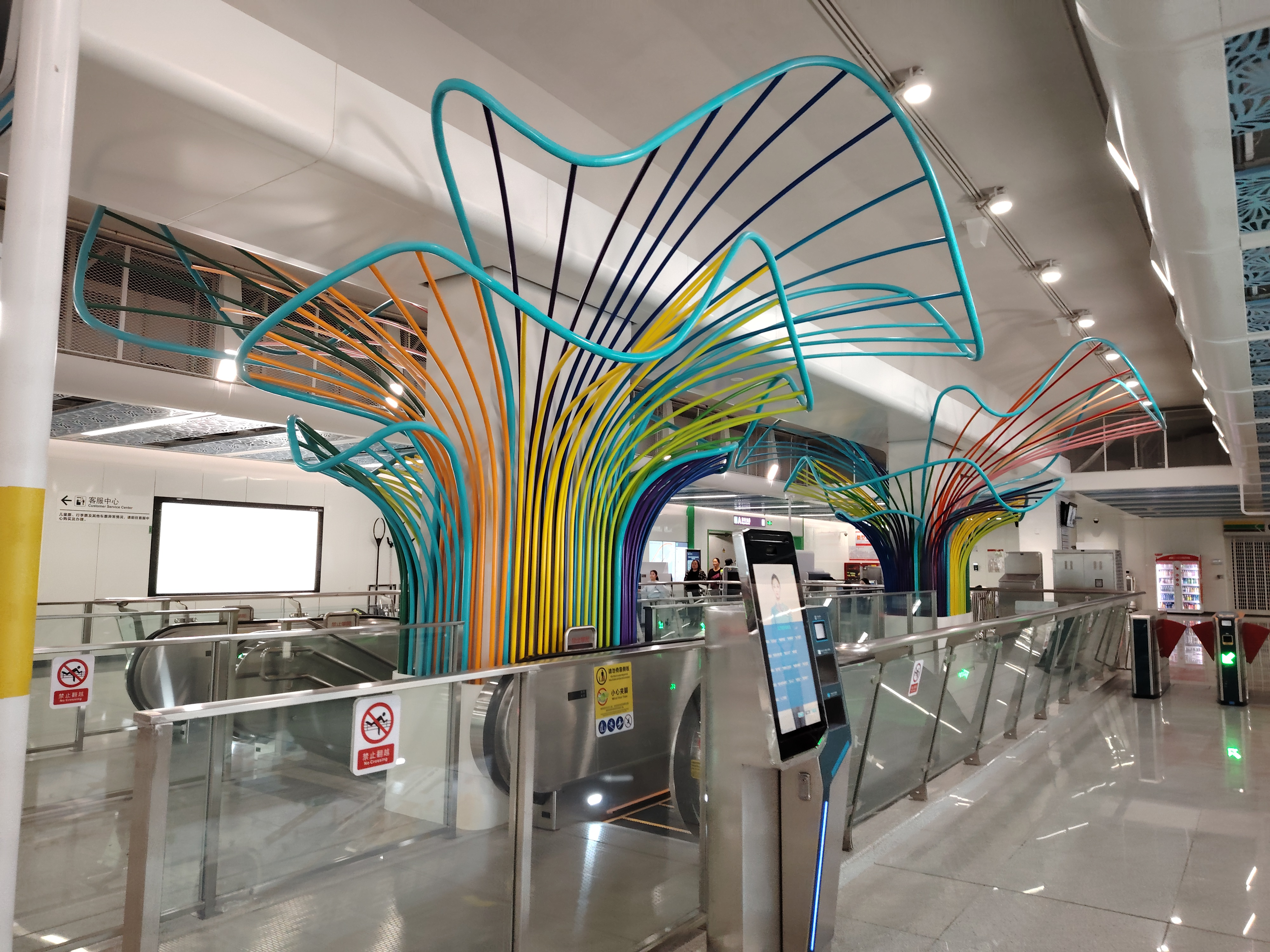
Station art

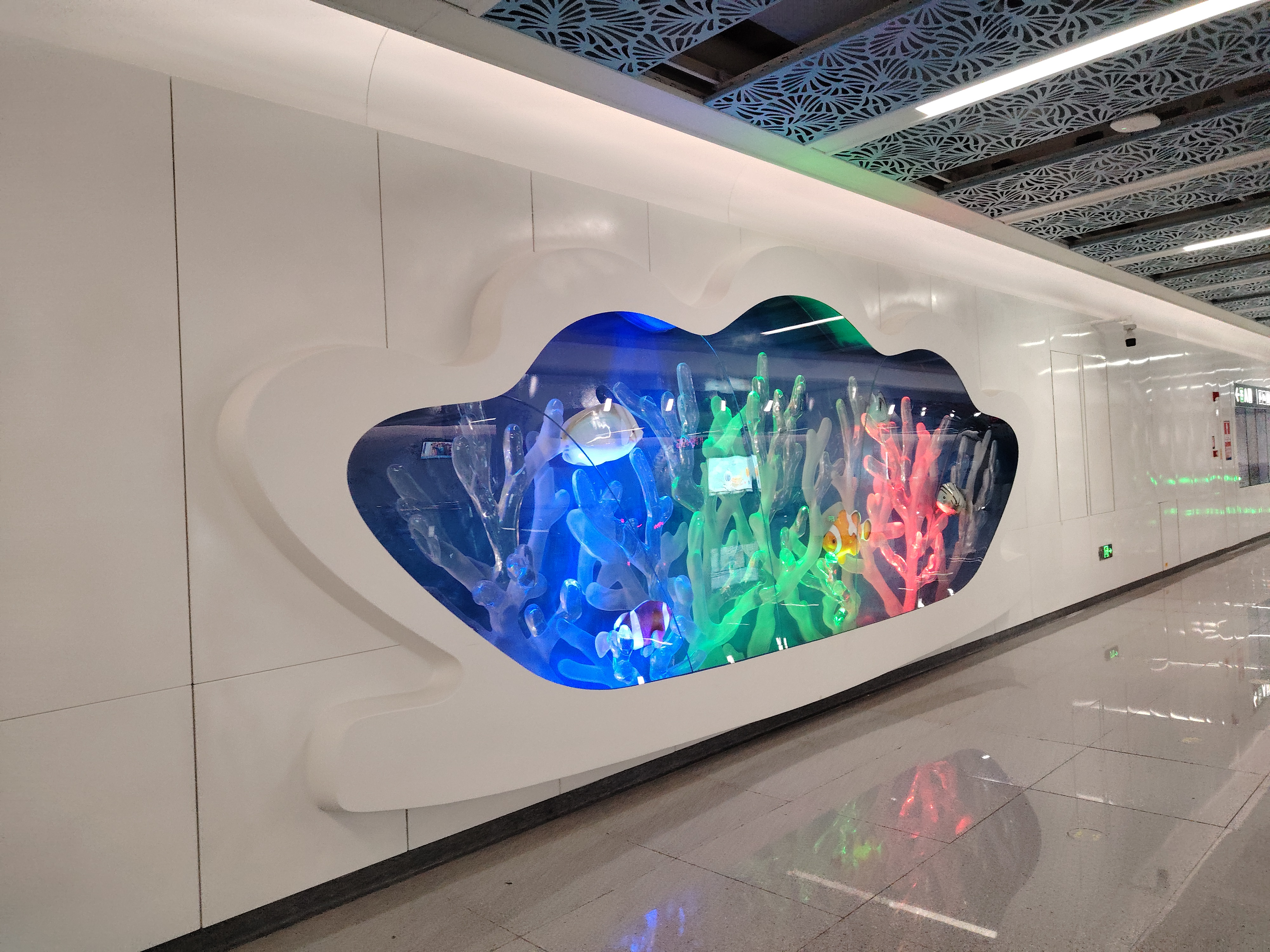
Wall art installation

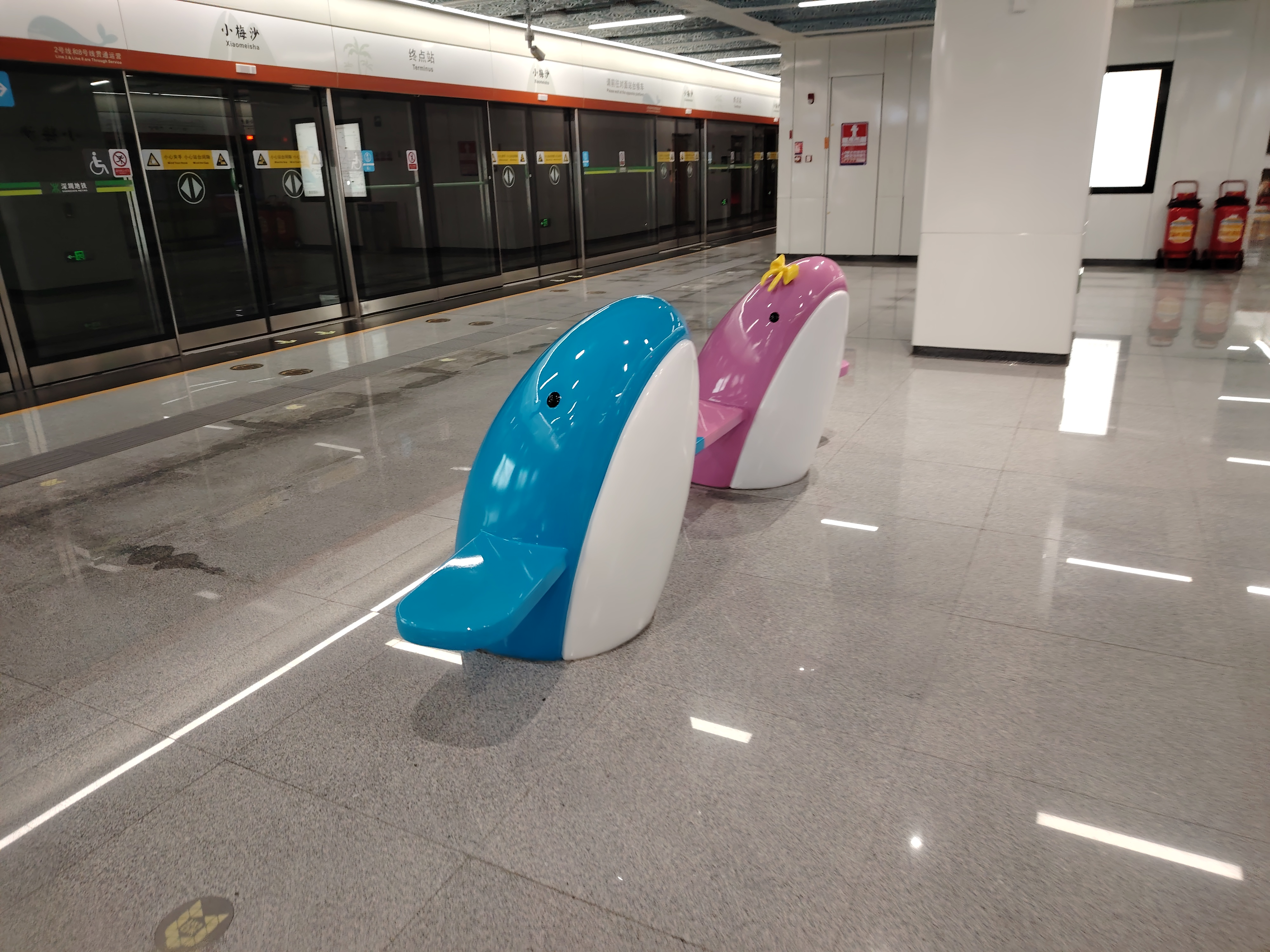
Dolphin couple stools, located on the platform
