= Chiwan station =

Metro station in Shenzhen, Guangdong, China

Coordinates: 22°28′46″N 113°53′56″E

Chiwan 赤湾
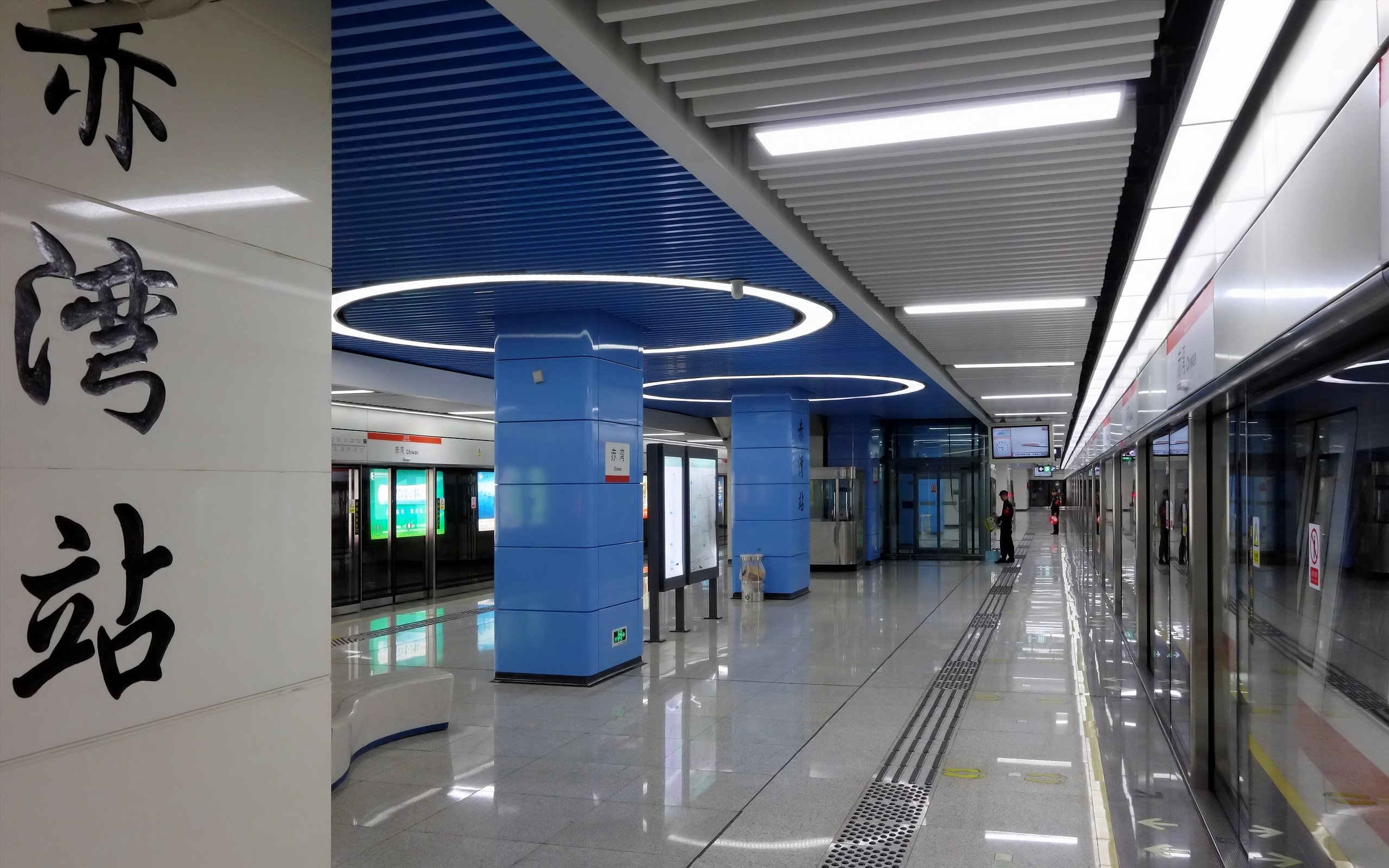
- Line 2 platform

Chinese name
- Traditional Chinese: 赤灣
- Simplified Chinese: 赤湾
- Literal meaning: Red/Crimson bay
Transcriptions
Standard Mandarin
- Hanyu Pinyin: Chì Wān
Yue: Cantonese
- Jyutping: Cek3 Waan1

General information
- Location: Nanshan District, Shenzhen, Guangdong; China
- Operator: SZMC (Shenzhen Metro Group)
- Lines: Line 2 Line 5
- Platforms: 4 (2 island platforms)
- Tracks: 4
- Connections: Shekou West

Construction
- Structure type: Underground
- Accessible: Yes

Other information
- Station code: 201 (Line 2); 501 (Line 5)

History
- Opened: Line 2: 28 December 2010; 15 years ago Line 5: 28 September 2019; 7 years ago

Services
Preceding station	Shenzhen Metro	Following station
Terminus	Line 2	Shekou Port towards Liantang (Line 8: Xichong)
Liwan towards Grand Theater	Line 5	Terminus
Route map
Location

Chiwan station (simplified Chinese: 赤湾站; traditional Chinese: 赤灣站; pinyin: Chìwān Zhàn; Jyutping: Cek3 Waan1 Zaam6) is the southwest terminal metro station on Line 2 and Line 5 of the Shenzhen Metro. It opened on 28 December 2010. The Line 5 platforms opened on 28 September 2019.

== Station layout ==
G	–	Exit
B1F; Concourse	Lobby	Customer Service, Shops, Vending machines, ATMs
B2F; Platforms	Platform	← Line 2 termination platform
B2F; Platforms	Island platform, doors will open on the left, right
B2F; Platforms	Platform	Line 8 towards Xichong (Shekou Port) →
B2F; Platforms	Platform	← Line 5 towards Grand Theater (Liwan)
B2F; Platforms	Island platform, doors will open on the left, right
B2F; Platforms	Platform	← Line 5 towards Grand Theater (Liwan)

== Exits ==
Exit	Destination
Exit B	North Side of Zuopaotai Road, North Side of Chiwan 6th Road (E), North Side of Hanggang Road (E), Gangji Building, Shanhaijin
Exit C	Hanggang Road, Chiwan Village, West Side of Xinghai Boulevard (S), Metro Security Inspection Battalion of Luohu Security Company, Shunsheng Logistics Shekou Warehouse
Exit D	West Side of Xinghai Boulevard (N), Shekou Station
Exit E	North Side of Chiwan 6th Road (W), Chiwan School, Shanyu Haiyuan
