= Xichong station =

Shenzhen Metro Line 8 station

Xichong 溪涌
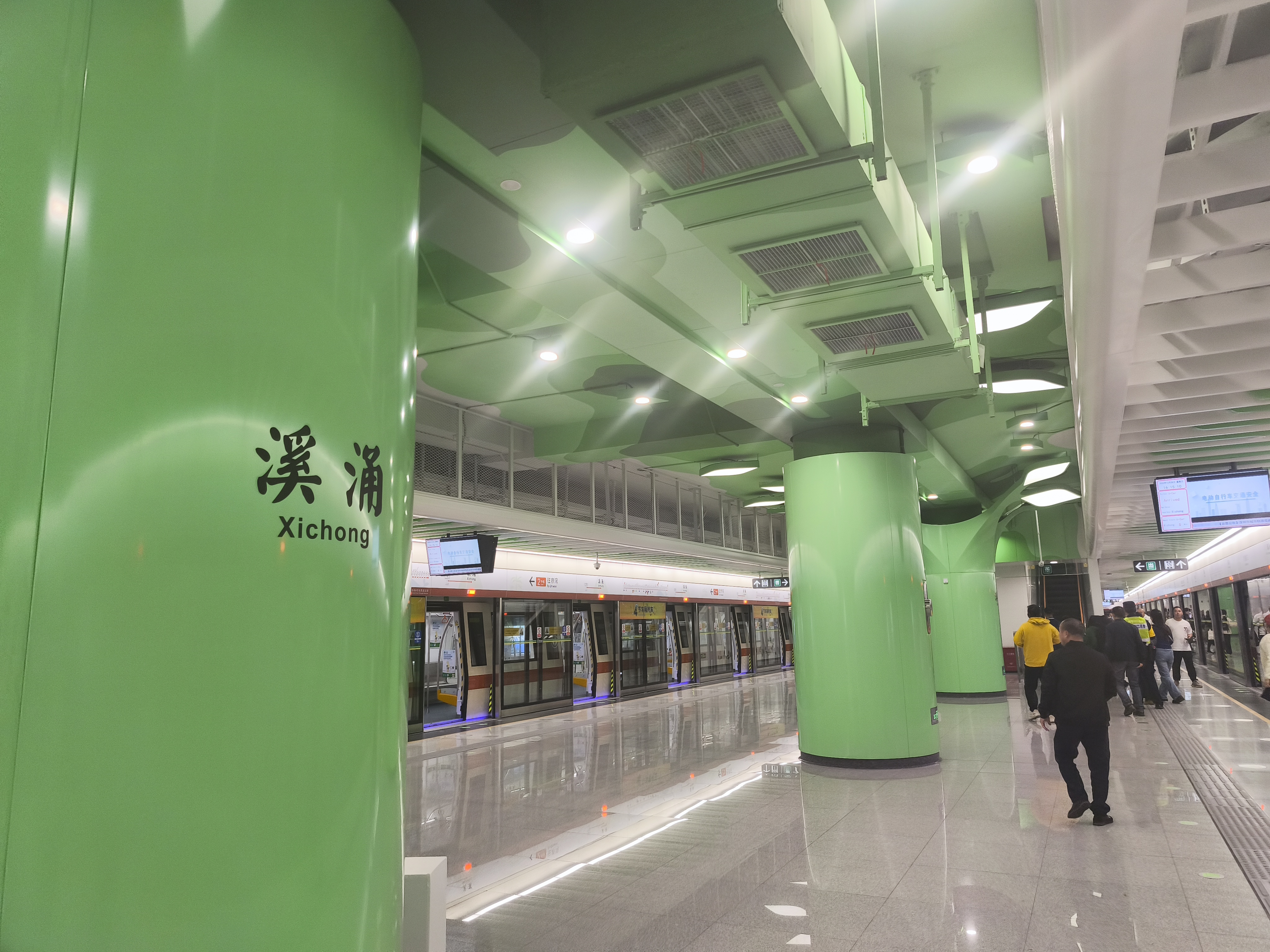
- Platform

Chinese name
- Chinese: 溪涌
Transcriptions
Standard Mandarin
- Hanyu Pinyin: Xīchōng
Yue: Cantonese
- Yale Romanization: Kāichūng
- Jyutping: kai^{1} cung^{1}

General information
- Location: Xichong Xihai Road (溪涌溪海路); Kuichong Subdistrict, Dapeng New Area, Shenzhen, Guangdong; China
- Coordinates: 22°36′53.827″N 114°21′20.491″E
- Operated by: SZMC (Shenzhen Metro Group)
- Line: Line 8
- Platforms: 2 (1 island platform)
- Tracks: 2

Construction
- Structure type: Underground
- Accessible: Yes

History
- Opened: 28 December 2025 (6 months ago)

Services
Preceding station	Shenzhen Metro	Following station
Xiaomeisha towards Liantang (Line 2: Chiwan)	Line 8	Terminus
Location

Xichong station (Chinese: 溪涌; pinyin: Xīchōng; Jyutping: kai^{1} cung^{1}; Cantonese Yale: Kāichūng) is a station on Line 8 of the Shenzhen Metro. It opened on 28 December 2025, with the Phase 3 extension of the line serving as its terminus station. It is located under Xihai Road.

Xichong station was the one and only station on the Line 8 Phase III extension. Trial runs for Phase III and the station began on 1 November 2025.

== Station layout ==
G	–	Exits A-D
B1F; Concourse	Lobby	Ticket Machines, Customer Service
B2F; Platforms		2 towards Chiwan (Xiaomeisha)
B2F; Platforms	Island platform, doors will open on the left
B2F; Platforms		8 termination platform

=== Gallery ===
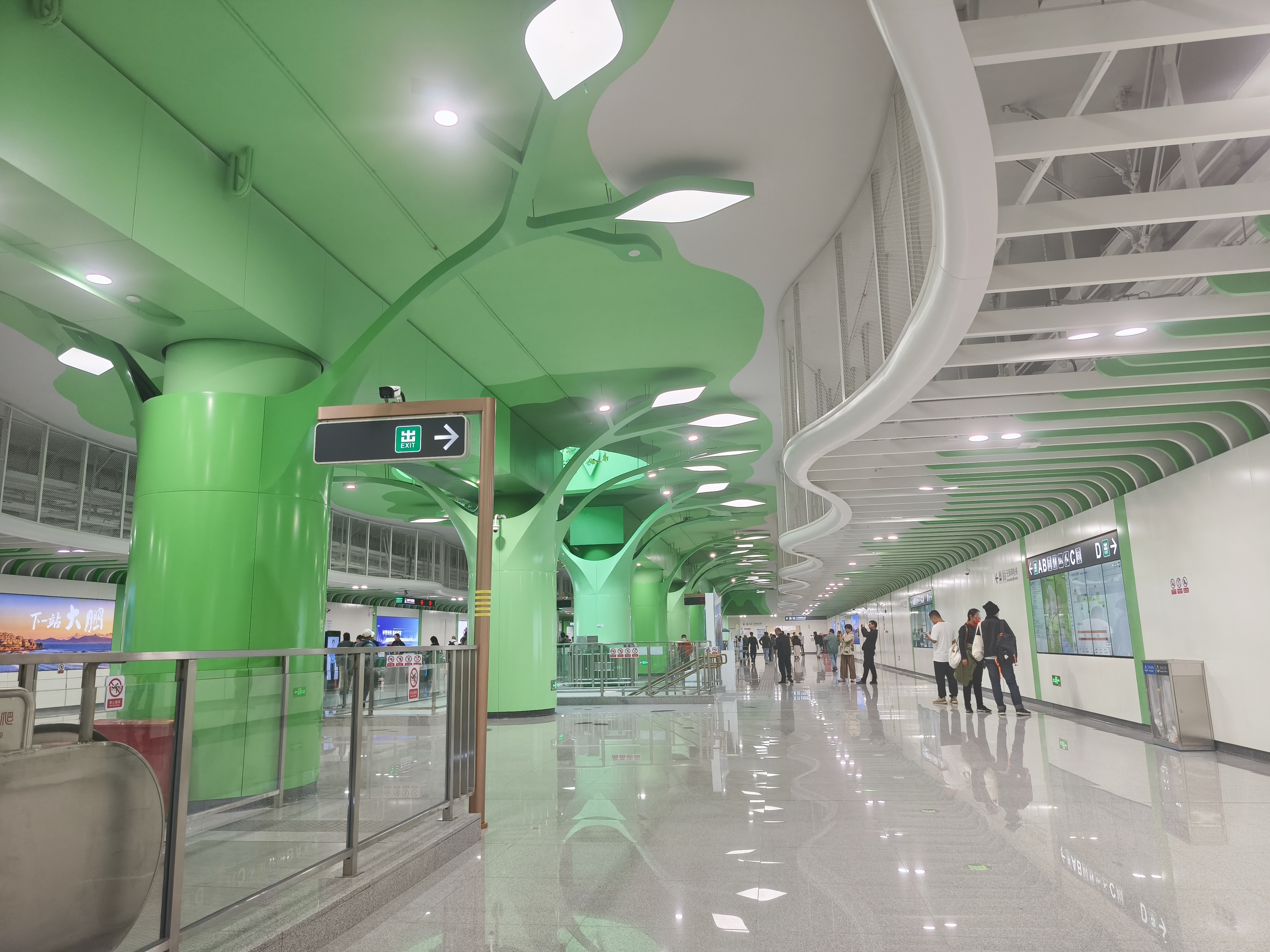
Concourse

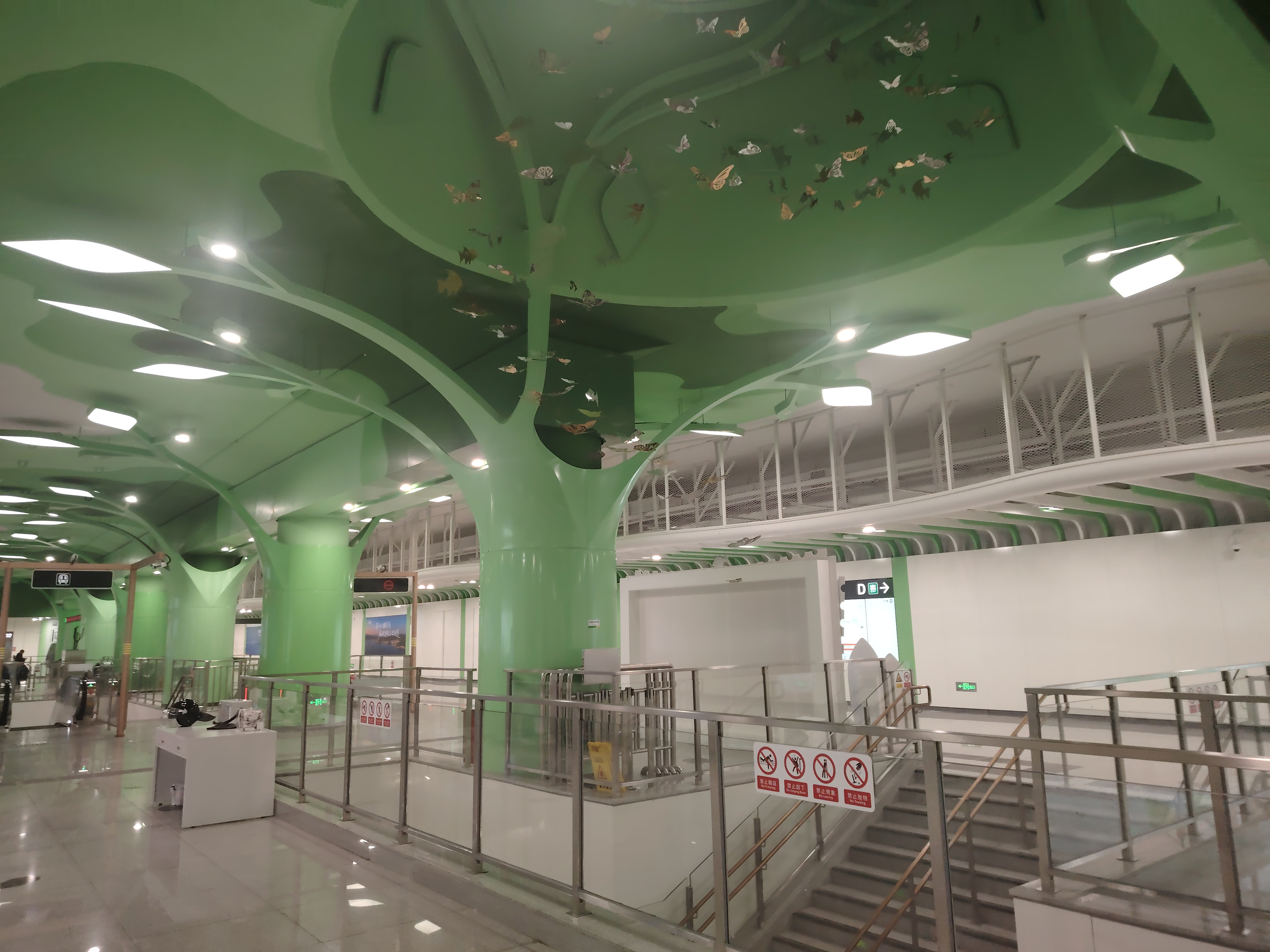
Station art located in the middle and ceiling

=== Entrances/exits ===
The station has 4 points of entry/exit. Exits B and C are equipped with elevators.

Exit	Pictures	Destination
A		North of Xihai Road, North of Shenkui Road, Xichong Primary School Affiliated to SMBU, Xichong Resort, Xichong Depot
B		East of Yanchong Road
C		West of Yanchong Road, Xichong Metro Station Bus Stand 1, Sanke Luwan, Yancun Industrial Zone
D		East of Yanxin 1st Road
