= 海月 =

海月, meaning "sea, moon" or "jellyfish" (in Japanese), may refer to:

- Haewŏl (해월), Yonan County, South Hwanghae Province, North Korea
- Haiyue, station of Shenzhen Metro
- Kaigetsu, Japanese given name
  - Kaigetsu Tsukinomori (月ノ森 海月), fictional character in Japanese light novel My Friend's Little Sister Has It In for Me!
- Kurage, Japanese given name
  - Kurage Aoba (蒼葉 海月), fictional character in Japanese manga TenPuru
- Mitsuki, Japanese given name and surname
  - Mizuki Akabayashi (赤林 海月), fictional character in Japanese light novel Durarara!!
  - Tarō Mitsuki (海月 太郎), fictional character in Japanese anime and manga Mermaid Melody Pichi Pichi Pitch
- Windowpane oyster for Mandarin in China Mainland

== See also ==
- The dictionary definition of 海 at Wiktionary
- The dictionary definition of 月 at Wiktionary
- Jellyfish (disambiguation)
- Moon (disambiguation)
- Sea (disambiguation)
- Kuragehime, Japanese manga
