= Lianhua West station =

Metro station in Shenzhen, Guangdong, China

Coordinates: 22°32′52″N 114°2′59″E

Lianhua West 莲花西
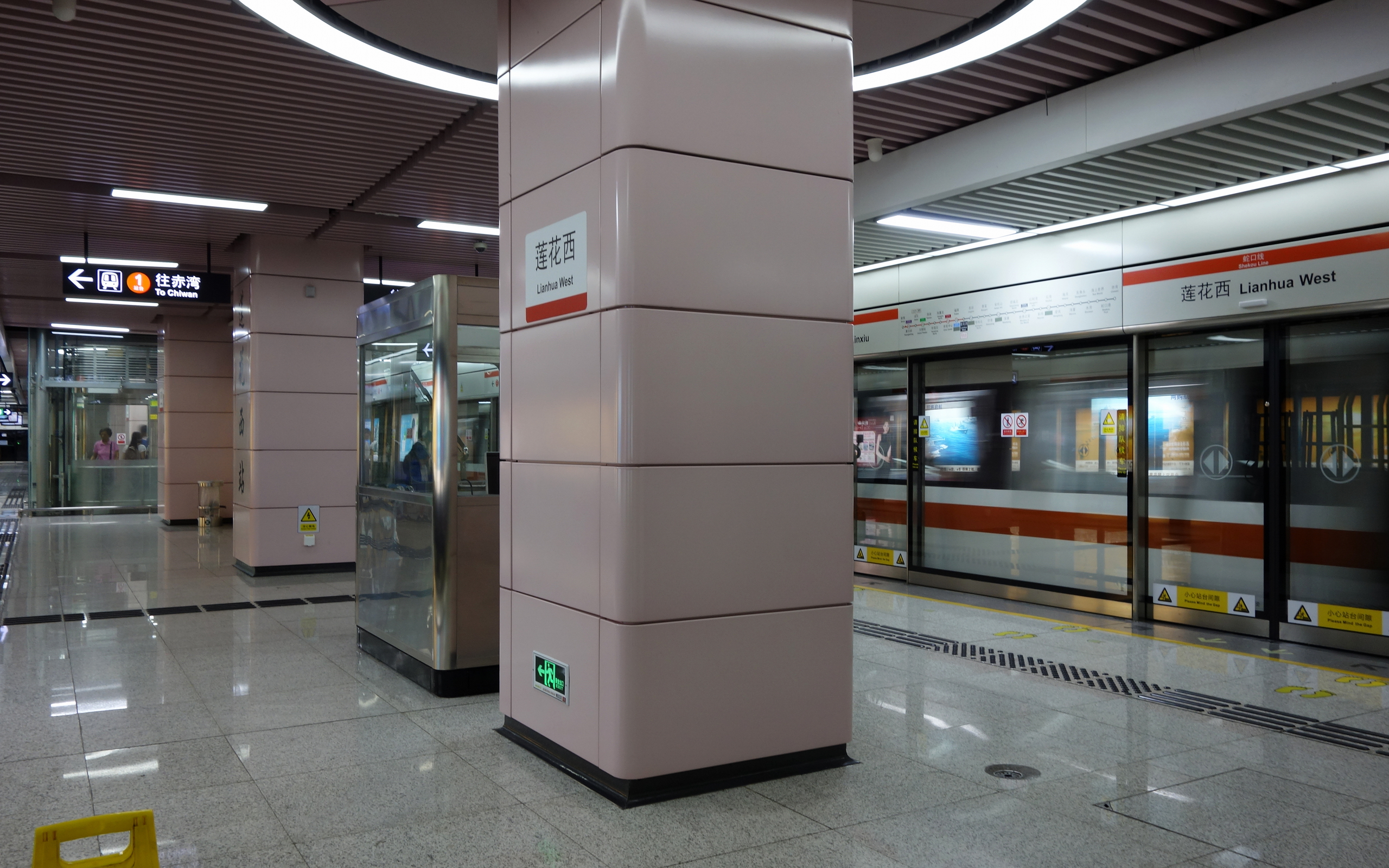

Chinese name
- Traditional Chinese: 蓮花西
- Simplified Chinese: 莲花西
- Literal meaning: Lotus West
Transcriptions
Standard Mandarin
- Hanyu Pinyin: Liánhuā Xī
Yue: Cantonese
- Jyutping: Lin4faa1 Sai1

General information
- Location: Futian District, Shenzhen, Guangdong; China
- Operated by: SZMC (Shenzhen Metro Group)
- Line: Line 2
- Platforms: 2 (1 island platform)
- Tracks: 2

Construction
- Structure type: Underground
- Accessible: Yes

Other information
- Station code: 220

History
- Opened: 28 June 2011 (14 years ago)

Services
| Preceding station | Shenzhen Metro | Following station |
|---|---|---|
| Jingtian towards Chiwan | Line 2 | Futian towards Liantang (Line 8: Xichong) |
Route map
- Not for scale.
Location

Lianhua West station (simplified Chinese: 莲花西站; traditional Chinese: 蓮花西站; pinyin: Liánhuā Xī Zhàn; Jyutping: Lin4faa1 Sai1 Zaam6; lit. 'Lotus West station') is a metro station on Line 2 of the Shenzhen Metro. It opened on 28 June 2011 as simplified Chinese: 莲花山西站; traditional Chinese: 蓮花山西站; pinyin: Liánhuā Shān Xī zhàn; Jyutping: Lin4faa1 Saan1 Sai1 Zaam6; lit. 'Lotus Hill West station'. It is located under Xinzhou Road and Hongli West Road.

== Station layout ==
| G | - | Exit |
| B1F; Concourse | Lobby | Customer Service, Shops, Vending machines, ATMs |
| B2F; Platforms | Platform | ← Line 2 towards Chiwan (Jingtian) |
| B2F; Platforms | Island platform, doors will open on the left |
| B2F; Platforms | Platform | Line 8 towards Xichong (Futian) → |

== Exits ==
| Exit | | Destination |
|---|---|---|
| Exit A | A1 | Xinzhou Road (E), Fuzhou 1st Road |
| Exit A | A2 | Hongli Road, Xinzhou Road (E), Lianhua Hill Park |
| Exit A | A3 | Xinzhou Road (W), Hongli West Road |
| Exit A | A4 | Xinzhou Road (W), Hongli West Road |
| Exit B | | Xinzhou Road, Fuzhong 1st Road, Huaqiang Vocational Technical School, Huangpu School Junior Middle Department |
