= Jingtian station =

Metro station in Shenzhen, Guangdong, China

Coordinates: 22°33′13″N 114°2′36″E

Jingtian 景田
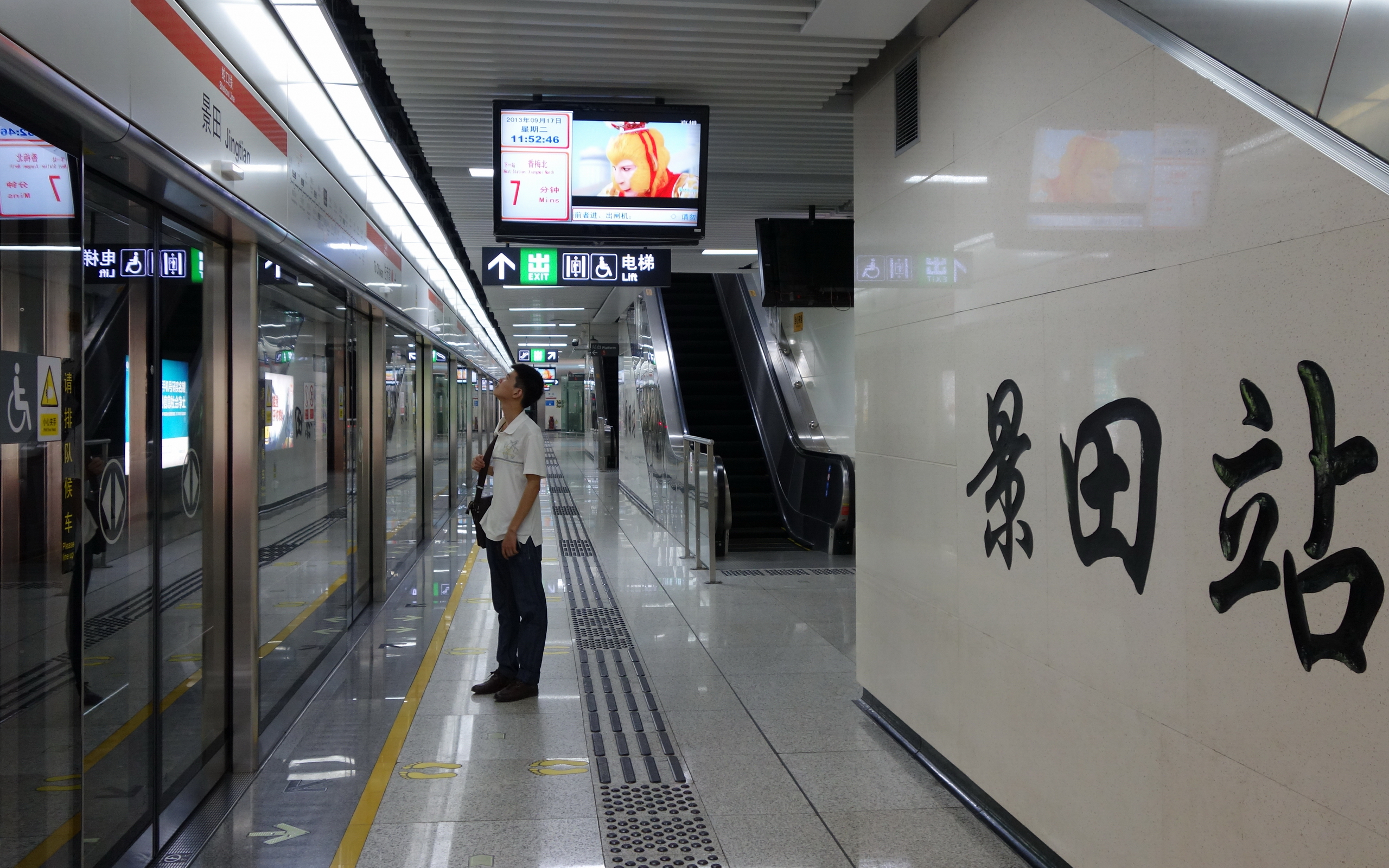

Chinese name
- Chinese: 景田
- Literal meaning: View Field
Transcriptions
Standard Mandarin
- Hanyu Pinyin: Jǐng Tían
Yue: Cantonese
- Jyutping: Ging2 Tin4

General information
- Location: Futian District, Shenzhen, Guangdong; China
- Operator: SZMC (Shenzhen Metro Group)
- Lines: Line 2; Line 9
- Platforms: 4 (1 island platform and 2 side platforms)
- Tracks: 4

Construction
- Structure type: Underground
- Accessible: Yes

Other information
- Station code: 219 (Line 2)

History
- Opened: Line 2: 28 June 2011 (15 years ago); Line 9: 28 October 2016 (10 years ago)

Services
Preceding station	Shenzhen Metro	Following station
Xiangmei North towards Chiwan	Line 2	Lianhua West towards Liantang (Line 8: Xichong)
Meijing towards Wenjin	Line 9	Xiangmei towards Qianwan
Track layout
2 Upper platforms (B2F)
9 Lower platforms (B3F)
Location

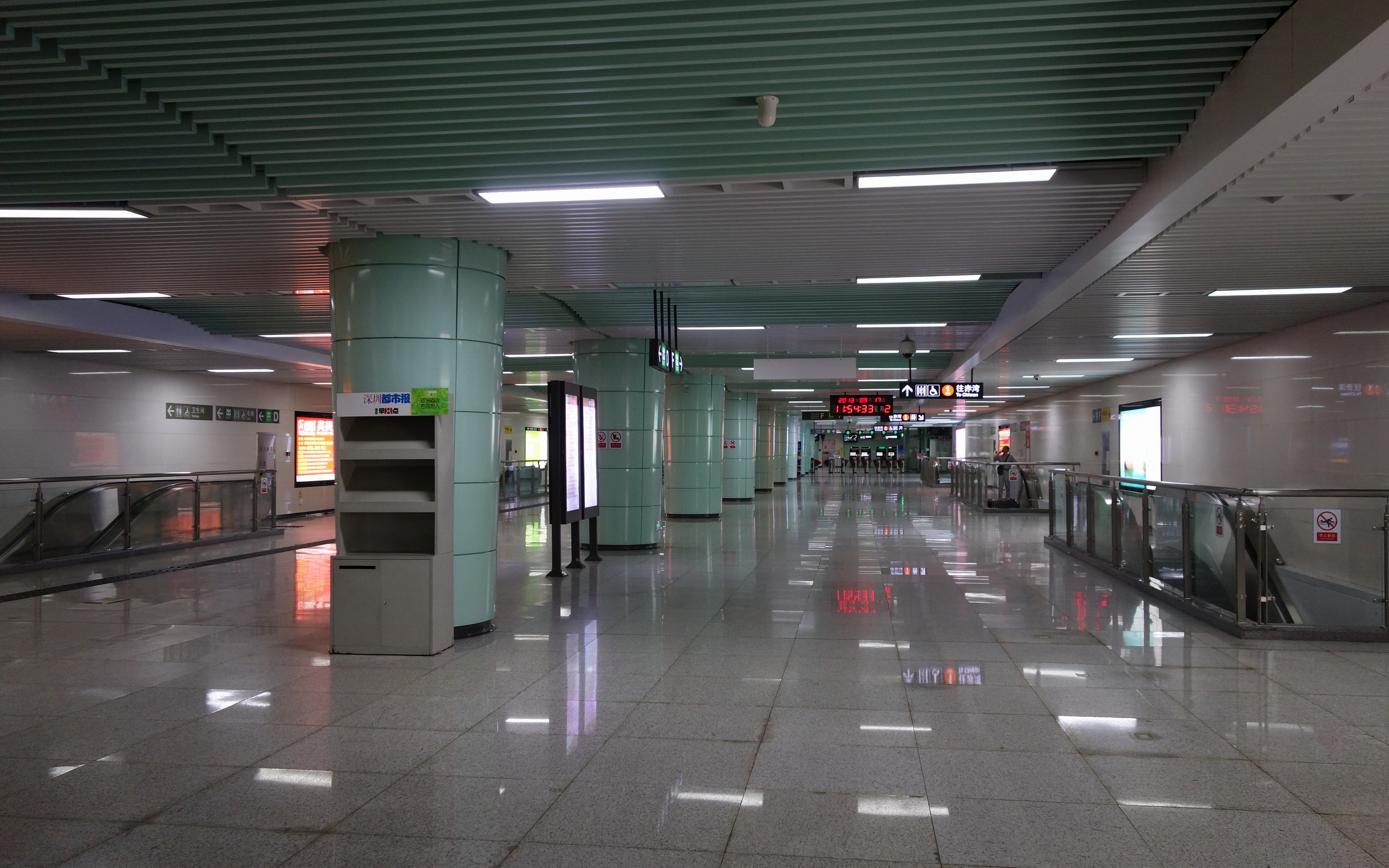
Concourse

Jingtian station (Chinese: 景田站; pinyin: Jǐngtían Zhàn; Jyutping: ging2 tin4 zaam6; lit. 'Sunny Field Station') is a metro station on Line 2, Line 8, and Line 9 of the Shenzhen Metro. It opened on 28 June 2011. Jingtian became an interchange with Line 9 on 30 December 2016.

== Station layout ==
G	-	Exit
B1F; Concourse	Lobby	Customer Service, Shops, Vending machines, ATMs
B2F; Platforms	Side platform, doors will open on the right
B2F; Platforms	Platform 1	← Line 2 towards Chiwan (Xiangmei North)
B2F; Platforms	Platform 2	Line 8 towards Xichong (Lianhua West) →
B2F; Platforms	Side platform, doors will open on the right
B3F; Platforms	Platform 3	← Line 9 towards Qianwan (Xiangmei)
B3F; Platforms	Island platform, doors will open on the left
B3F; Platforms	Platform 4	Line 9 towards Wenjin (Meijing) →

== Exits ==
Exit	Destination
Exit A	Jingtian Road (W), Wantuo Homestead, Bijing Garden
Exit B	Jingtian Road (S), Jingtian Plaza Hotel, Shenzhen Women & Child Development Center, Futian Library, Tianping Building
Exit C	Jingtian East Street, Shenzhen Commercial Daily Building, Shenzhen Finance Committee, Shenzhen City Bureau of Justice, Shenzhen Audit Bureau, Shenzhen Women & Child Development Center
Exit D	Beijing University Hospital, Futian District Cultural Center, Futian District Hospital, Futian Library, Jingtian East Road, Lianhua Road (N), Shenzhen City Finance Committee, Shenzhen Audit Bureau, Shenzhen City Bureau of Justice
Exit E	King Tin Street, China Tea Palace, Futian District Cultural Center, Jingxiu Primary School
Exit F	Women's Mansion, Jingtian Road, Jingxiu Primary School, Jingxiu Secondary School, Lianhua Road (N), Shenzhen Traffic Monitoring Center
