= Dongjiaotou station =

Metro station in Shenzhen, Guangdong, China

Coordinates: 22°29′9″N 113°55′53″E

Dongjiaotou 东角头
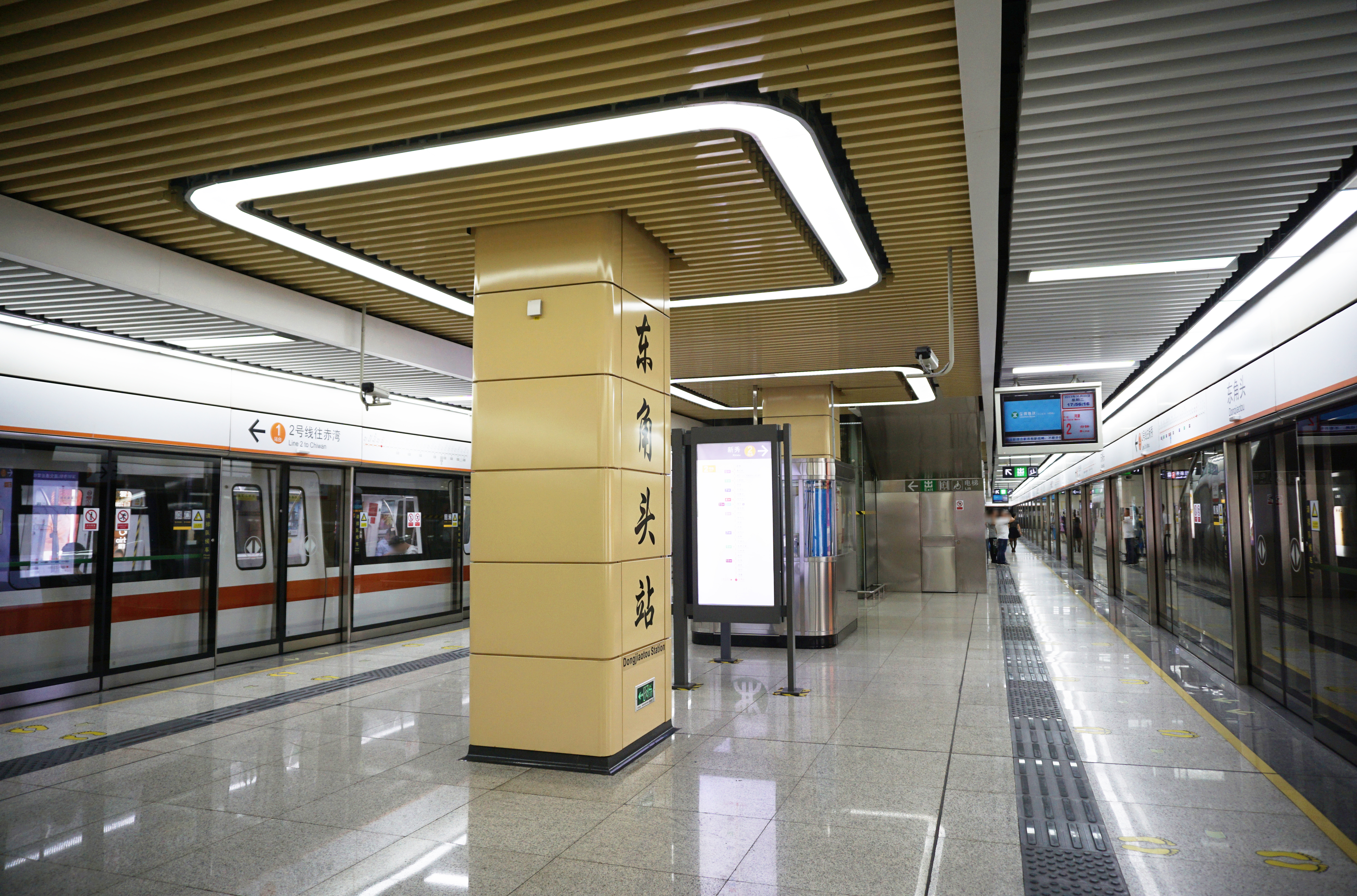

Chinese name
- Traditional Chinese: 東角頭
- Simplified Chinese: 东角头
- Literal meaning: East Corner Head
Transcriptions
Standard Mandarin
- Hanyu Pinyin: Dōng Jiǎo Tóu
Yue: Cantonese
- Jyutping: Dung1 Gok3 Tau4

General information
- Location: Nanshan District, Shenzhen, Guangdong; China
- Operated by: SZMC (Shenzhen Metro Group)
- Lines: Line 2 Line 13 (Under construction)
- Platforms: 2 (1 island platform)
- Tracks: 2

Construction
- Structure type: Underground
- Accessible: Yes

Other information
- Station code: 205

History
- Opened: 28 December 2010; 15 years ago

Services
Preceding station	Shenzhen Metro	Following station
Shuiwan towards Chiwan	Line 2	Wanxia towards Liantang (Line 8: Xichong)
Terminus	Line 13 Under construction	Opera House towards Gongming North
Route map
Location

Dongjiaotou station (simplified Chinese: 东角头站; traditional Chinese: 東角頭站; pinyin: Dōngjiǎotóu Zhàn; Jyutping: Dung1 Gok3 Tau4 Zaam6) is a metro station on Line 2 of the Shenzhen Metro. It opened on 28 December 2010.

It caters mainly to residents living in existing buildings along Wangxia Road, Shekou Square and the newer developments of "Peninsula I" and "Peninsula II", along the central part of Wanghai Road. Peninsula I and I are a set of residential skyscrapers developed by Shenzhen Nanhai Yitian Property Development, a subsidiary of the China Merchants Group.

== Station layout ==
G	-	Exit
B1F; Concourse	Lobby	Customer Service, Shops, Vending machines, ATMs
B2F; Platforms	Platform	← Line 2 towards Chiwan (Shuiwan)
B2F; Platforms	Island platform, doors will open on the left
B2F; Platforms	Platform	Line 8 towards Xichong (Wanxia) →

== Exits ==
Exit	Destination
Exit A	Nanshui Pedestrian Street, Wanxia Road, Shekou Yu'ercun, Shekou Market
Exit B	Golden Century Road, Shekou Xinjie Street (S), Shekou Square
Exit D	Shekou Xinjie Street (N), Wanxia Road, Shenzhen Shekou People Hospital, Shekou School Nanshan
