= Liantang Checkpoint station =

Metro station in Shenzhen, Guangdong, China

Liantang Checkpoint 莲塘口岸
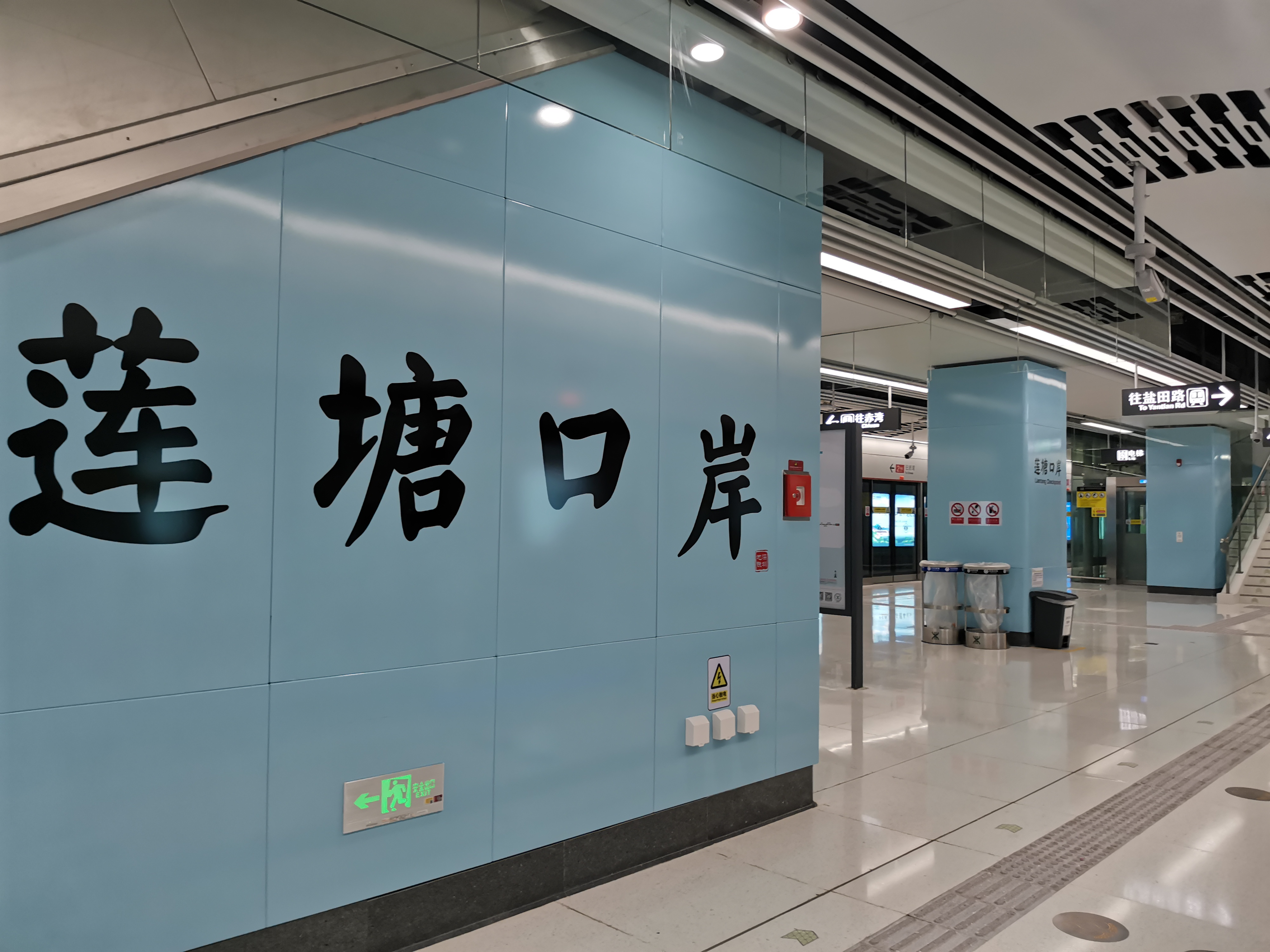
- Platforms

Chinese name
- Simplified Chinese: 莲塘口岸站
- Traditional Chinese: 蓮塘口岸站
Transcriptions
Standard Mandarin
- Hanyu Pinyin: Liántáng Kǒu'àn Zhàn
Yue: Cantonese
- Jyutping: lin4 tong4 hau2 on6 zaam6

General information
- Location: Luosha Road (罗沙路); Luohu District, Shenzhen, Guangdong; China
- Coordinates: 22°33′21.2″N 114°9′0.7″E
- Operator: Shenzhen Metro Group
- Line: Line 2
- Platforms: 2 (1 island platform)
- Tracks: 2

Construction
- Structure type: Underground
- Accessible: Yes

History
- Opened: 28 October 2020

Services
| Preceding station | Shenzhen Metro | Following station |
|---|---|---|
| Xinxiu towards Chiwan | Line 2 | Xianhu Road towards Liantang (Line 8: Xichong) |
Location

Liantang Checkpoint (Chinese: 莲塘口岸) is a station on Line 2 of the Shenzhen Metro. It opened on 28 October 2020.

== Station layout ==
| G | Street level | Exit |
| B1F; Concourse | Lobby | Customer service, shops, ticket vending machines, ATMs, full body scanners |
| B2F; Platforms | Platform | ← Line 2 towards Chiwan (Xinxiu) |
| B2F; Platforms | Island platform, doors will open on the left |
| B2F; Platforms | Platform | Line 8 towards Xichong (Xianhu Road) → |

== Entrances/exits ==
- A1: South side of Luosha Rd (E), Xiling Garden (NE), Xilong Villa
- A2: Lanting International Famous Garden, Liantang Checkpoint Inspection Building
- A3: Lanting International Famous Garden, Liantang Checkpoint Inspection Building
- B: North side of Luosha Rd (E), Guangling Garden, Cuifeng Pavilion
- C: West side of Yanfang Rd (N), Patrol Unit, Luohu Subbureau, Shenzhen Municipal Public Security Bureau, Donghu Park, Luohu Sports Park, Luohu Gymnasium, China Construction Garden, Huaqing Garden
- D: West side of Yanfang Rd (N), Xiling Garden
