= Wanxia station =

Metro station in Shenzhen, Guangdong, China

Coordinates: 22°29′36″N 113°56′19″E

Wanxia 湾厦
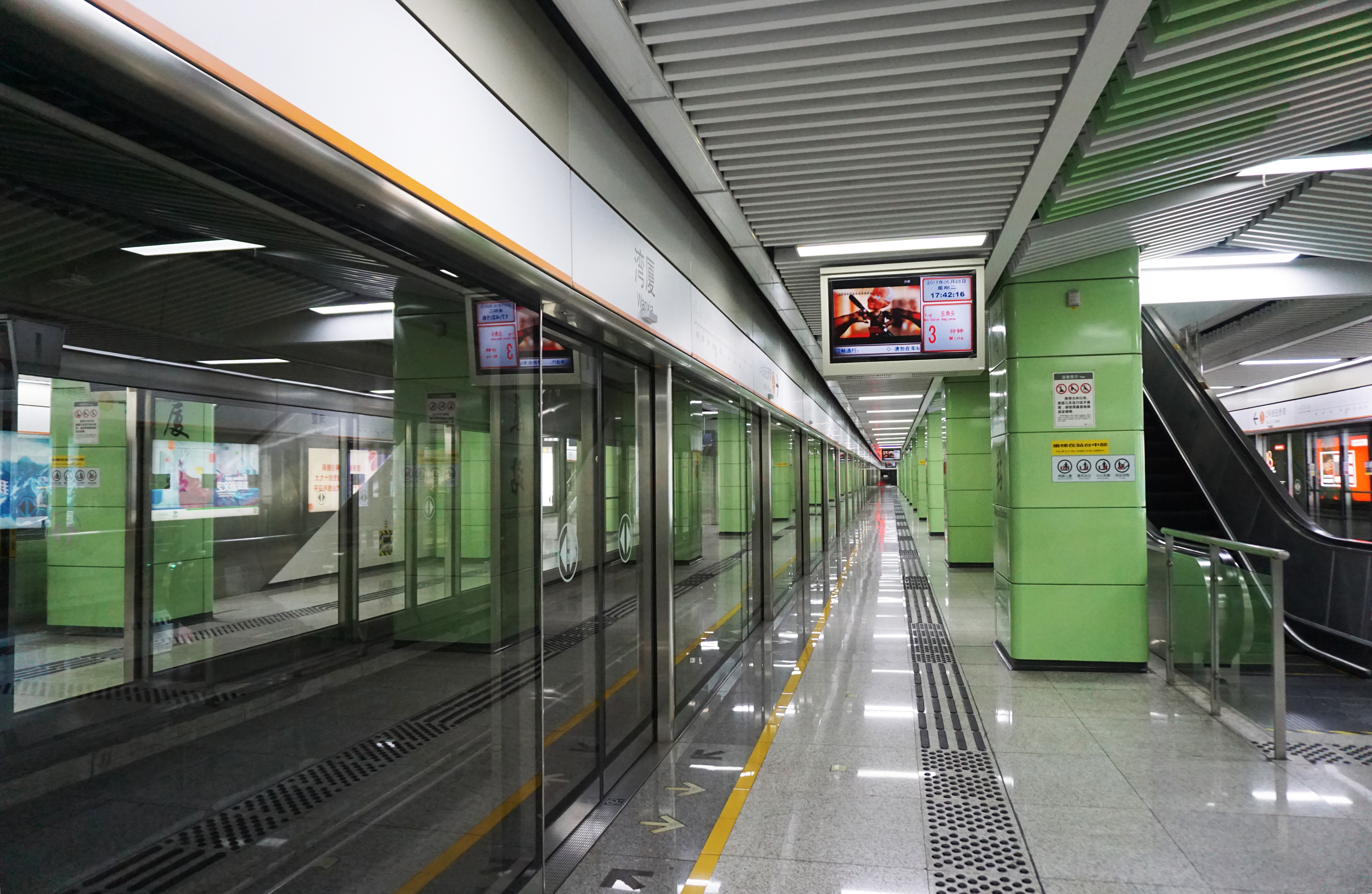
- Wanxia Station

Chinese name
- Traditional Chinese: 灣廈
- Simplified Chinese: 湾厦
- Literal meaning: Bay building
Transcriptions
Standard Mandarin
- Hanyu Pinyin: Wān Xià
Yue: Cantonese
- Jyutping: Waan1 Haa6

General information
- Location: Nanshan District, Shenzhen, Guangdong; China
- Operator: SZMC (Shenzhen Metro Group)
- Line: Line 2
- Platforms: 4 (2 island platforms)
- Tracks: 3

Construction
- Structure type: Underground
- Accessible: Yes

Other information
- Station code: 206

History
- Opened: 28 December 2010; 15 years ago

Services
Preceding station	Shenzhen Metro	Following station
Dongjiaotou towards Chiwan	Line 2	Haiyue towards Liantang (Line 8: Xichong)
Route map
- † Not for scale
Location

Wanxia station (simplified Chinese: 湾厦站; traditional Chinese: 灣廈站; pinyin: Wānxià Zhàn; Jyutping: Waan1 Haa6 Zaam6) is a station on Line 2 of the Shenzhen Metro. It opened on 28 December 2010. The station has two levels and dual island platforms; each island platform is 8.5 meters wide, and the total construction area is 22,800 square meters.

== Station layout ==
G	-	Exit
B1F; Concourse	Lobby	Customer Service, Shops, Vending machines, ATMs
B2F; Platforms	Platform	← Line 2 towards Chiwan (Dongjiaotou)
B2F; Platforms	Island platform, doors will open on the left
B2F; Platforms	Platform 2 ↑ Platform 3 ↓	No regular service
B2F; Platforms	Island platform, doors will open on the left
B2F; Platforms	Platform	Line 8 towards Xichong (Haiyue) →

== Exits ==
Exit	Destination
Exit A	Houhaibin Road (E), Zhaoshang East Road (S)
Exit B	Houhaibin Road (E), Zhaoshang East Road (N), Helen Garden Phase III
Exit C	Houhaibin Road (W), Zhaoshang East Road (N), Yucai Third Middle School, No. 4 Primary School of Yucai Education Group, Wanxia Village Committee, The New Platform, Aocheng Garden
Exit D	Houhaibin Road (W), Zhaoshang East Road (S)
