= Xiangmi station =

Metro station in Shenzhen, China

Coordinates: 22°33′10″N 114°1′27″E

Xiangmi 香蜜
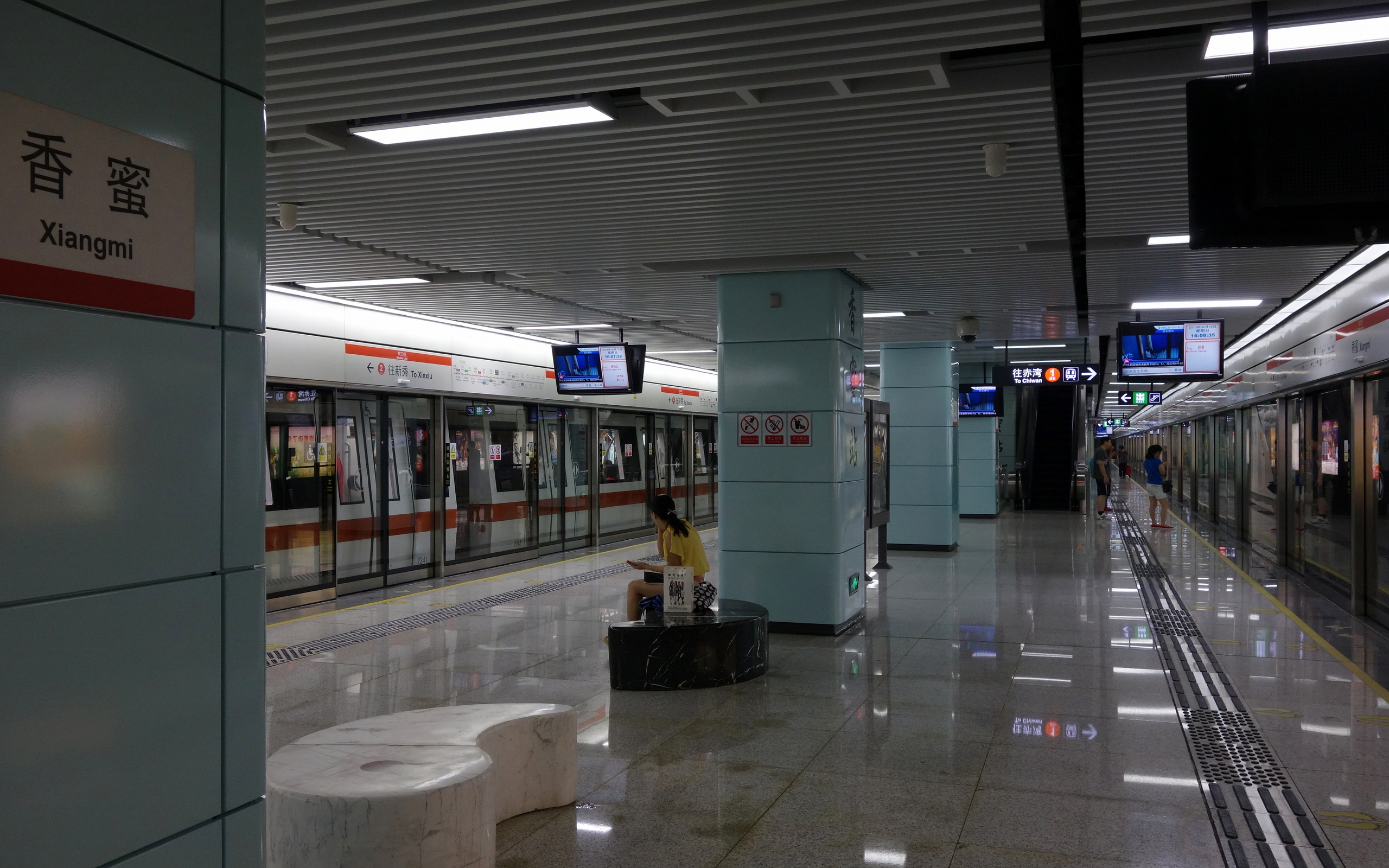

Chinese name
- Chinese: 香蜜
- Literal meaning: Honey
Transcriptions
Standard Mandarin
- Hanyu Pinyin: Xiāng Mì
Yue: Cantonese
- Jyutping: Hoeng1 Mat6

General information
- Location: Futian District, Shenzhen, Guangdong; China
- Operator: SZMC (Shenzhen Metro Group)
- Line: Line 2
- Platforms: 2 (1 island platform)
- Tracks: 2

Construction
- Structure type: Underground
- Accessible: Yes

Other information
- Station code: 217

History
- Opened: 28 June 2011 (15 years ago)

Services
Preceding station	Shenzhen Metro	Following station
Qiaoxiang towards Chiwan	Line 2	Xiangmei North towards Liantang (Line 8: Xichong)
Route map
Location

Xiangmi station (Chinese: 香蜜站; pinyin: Xiāngmì Zhàn; lit. 'Honey station') is a station on Line 2 and Line 8 of the Shenzhen Metro. It opened on 28 June 2011. It is located nearby the Xiangmi Road.

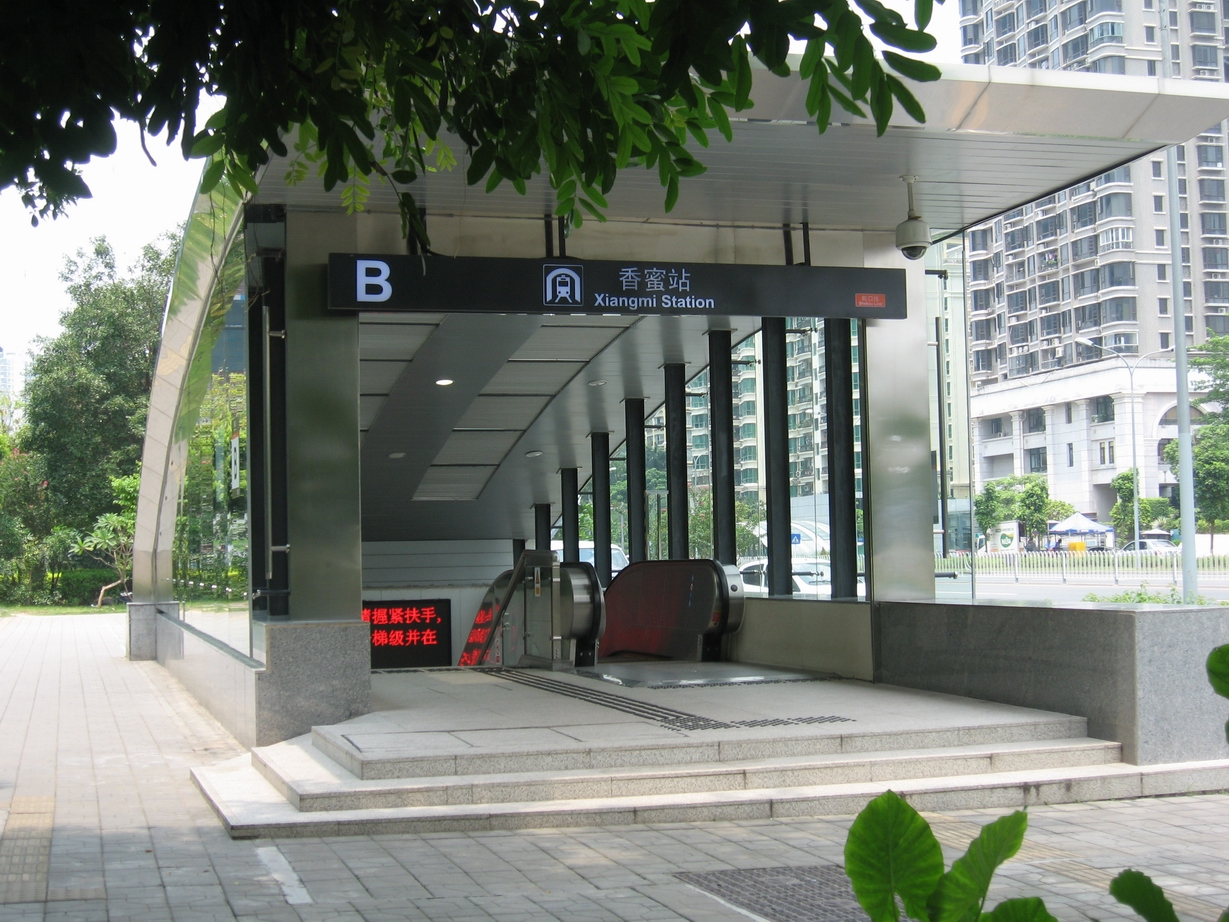
Exit B

There are many housing estates near the station.

== Station layout ==
G	-	Exit
B1F; Concourse	Lobby	Customer Service, Shops, Vending machines, ATMs
B2F; Platforms	Platform	← Line 2 towards Chiwan (Qiaoxiang)
B2F; Platforms	Island platform, doors will open on the left
B2F; Platforms	Platform	Line 8 towards Xichong (Xiangmei North) →

== Exits ==
Exit	Destination
Exit B	Qiaoxiang Road (S), Xiangmihu Haoting, Xintian Guoji Mingyuan, Xianghui Yayuan, Xiyuan, Xueyuan Building, Flower Market, Party School of the Shenzhen Municipal Committee of the CPC
Exit D	Qiaoxiang Road (N), Fengdan Yayuan, Jiayuan, Hengxingyuan, Xiangyayuan, Xiangmihu Haocheng, Haofengyuan, Meilin Water Plant of Shenzhen Water Group, Wenxin Homestead
