= Qiaoxiang station =

Metro station in Shenzhen, China

Coordinates: 22°33′0″N 114°0′52″E

Qiaoxiang 侨香
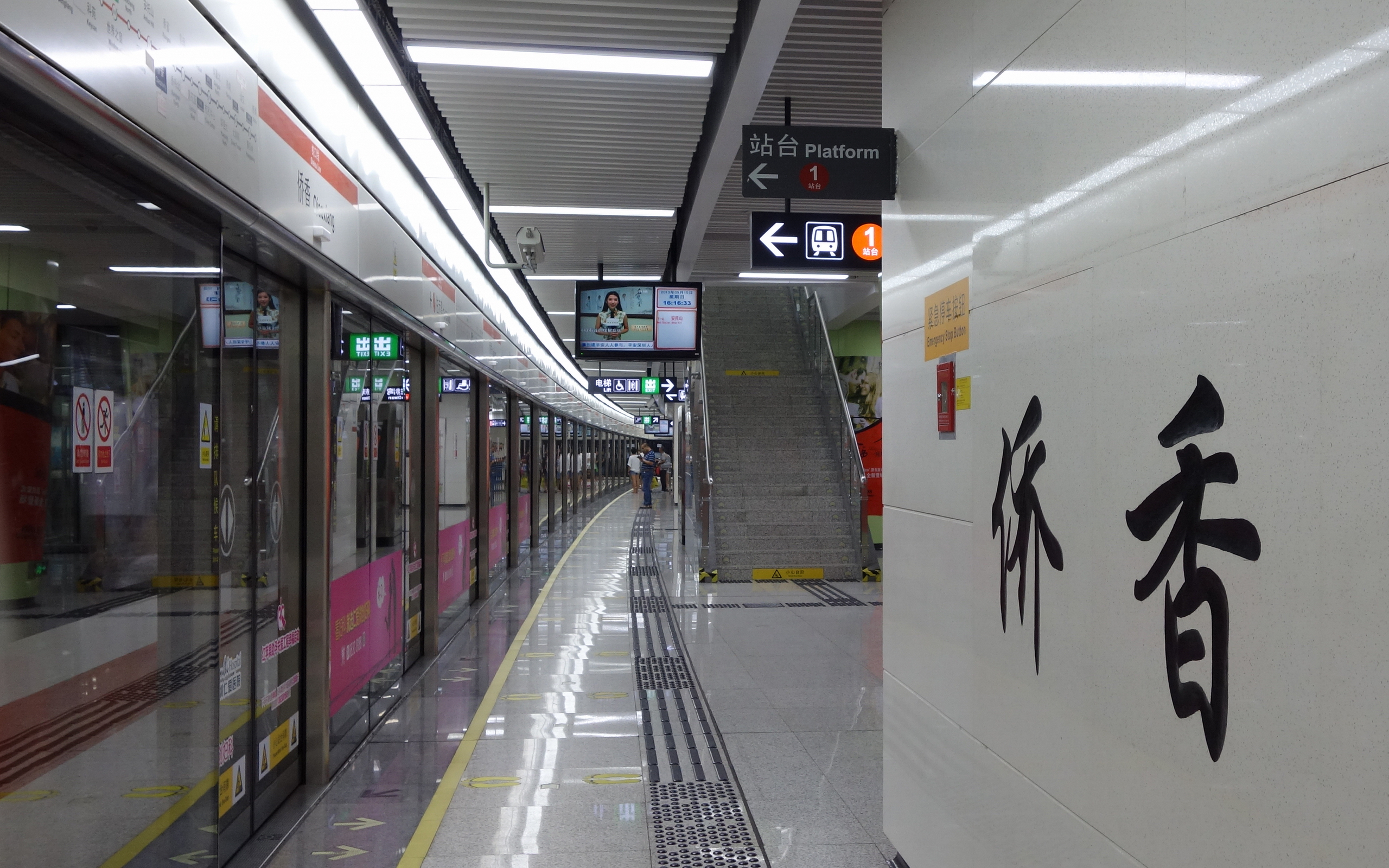

Chinese name
- Traditional Chinese: 僑香
- Simplified Chinese: 侨香
Transcriptions
Standard Mandarin
- Hanyu Pinyin: Qiáo Xiāng
Yue: Cantonese
- Jyutping: Kiu4 Hoeng1

General information
- Location: Futian District, Shenzhen, Guangdong; China
- Operator: SZMC (Shenzhen Metro Group)
- Line: Line 2
- Platforms: 2 (1 island platform)
- Tracks: 2

Construction
- Structure type: Underground
- Accessible: Yes

Other information
- Station code: 216

History
- Opened: 28 June 2011; 15 years ago

Services
Preceding station	Shenzhen Metro	Following station
Antuo Hill towards Chiwan	Line 2	Xiangmi towards Liantang (Line 8: Xichong)
Route map
Location

Qiaoxiang station (simplified Chinese: 侨香站; traditional Chinese: 僑香站; pinyin: Qiáoxiāng Zhàn; Jyutping: kiu4 hoeng1 zaam6) is a station on Line 2 and Line 8 of the Shenzhen Metro. It opened on 28 June 2011. It is located nearby the Qiaoxiang Road.

== Station layout ==
G	-	Exit
B1F; Concourse	Lobby	Customer Service, Shops, Vending machines, ATMs
B2F; Platforms	Platform	← Line 2 towards Chiwan (Antuo Hill)
B2F; Platforms	Island platform, doors will open on the left
B2F; Platforms	Platform	Line 8 towards Xichong (Xiangmi) →

== Exits ==
Exit		Destination
Exit A		Qiaoxiang Road, Shenzhen Ophthalmologic Hospital, Economic Crime Investigation Bureau of Shenzhen Public Security Bureau, Guohua Building, Hongyunge, Shenzhen Municipal Corps of Chinese People's Armed Police Force, New Global Horse
Exit B		Nongyuan Road, Runtian Road, Shenzhen Senior High School, Xiangyu Central Garden Phase I, Liyuan Foreign Language Primary School
Exit C	C1	Qiaoxiang Road (E), Cuihai Garden, Qiaoxiang Xincun, Futian Foreign Language School, Jindi Xiangmishan Residence, Xiangge Liyuan, Vanke Wenxin Homestead, Shenzhen Housing Provident Fund Management Center
Exit C	C2	Qiaoxiang Road (W)
