= Dengliang station =

Metro station in Shenzhen, China

Coordinates: 22°30′33″N 113°56′15″E

Dengliang 登良
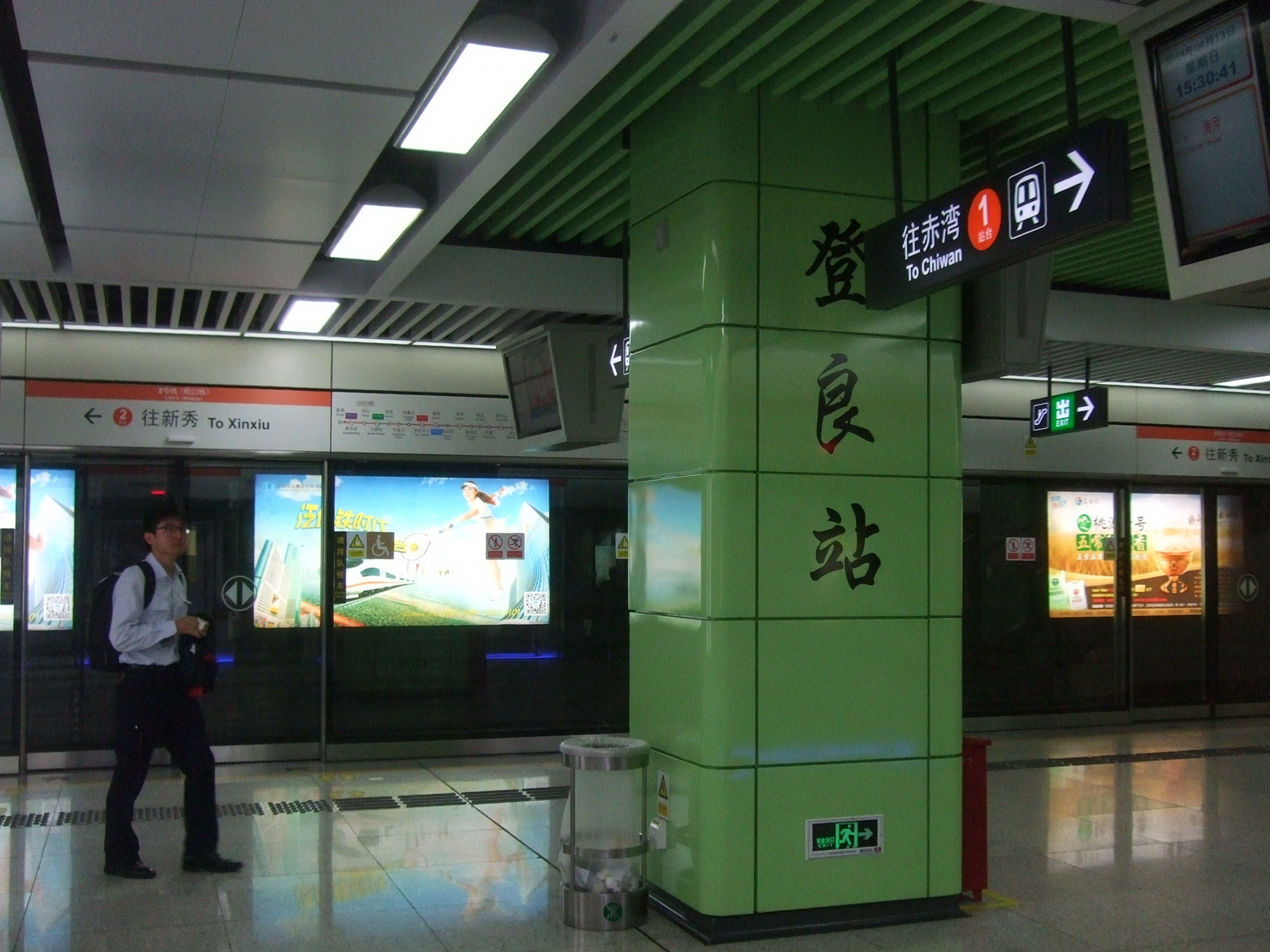

Chinese name
- Chinese: 登良
Transcriptions
Standard Mandarin
- Hanyu Pinyin: Dēng Liáng
Yue: Cantonese
- Jyutping: Dang1 Loeng4

General information
- Location: Nanshan District, Shenzhen, Guangdong; China
- Operator: SZMC (Shenzhen Metro Group)
- Line: Line 2
- Platforms: 2 (1 island platform)
- Tracks: 2

Construction
- Structure type: Underground
- Accessible: Yes

Other information
- Station code: 208

History
- Opened: 28 December 2010; 15 years ago

Services
Preceding station	Shenzhen Metro	Following station
Haiyue towards Chiwan	Line 2	Houhai towards Liantang (Line 8: Xichong)
Route map
Location

Dengliang station (Chinese: 登良站; pinyin: Dēngliáng Zhàn; Jyutping: Dang1 Loeng4 Zaam6) is a metro station on Line 2 and Line 8 of the Shenzhen Metro. It opened on 28 December 2010.

== Station layout ==
G	-	Exit
B1F; Concourse	Lobby	Customer Service, Shops, Vending machines, ATMs
B2F; Platforms	Platform	← Line 2 towards Chiwan (Haiyue)
B2F; Platforms	Island platform, doors will open on the left
B2F; Platforms	Platform	Line 8 towards Xichong (Houhai) →

== Exits ==
Exit	Destination
Exit A	Houhaibin Road (E)
Exit B	Houhaibin Road (E)
Exit C	Houhaibin Road (E), Dengliang Road
Exit D	Dengliang Road, Nanshan Primary School Attached to Beijing Normal University, Côte d'Azur, Nanyou Building
Exit E	Houhaibin Road (W), Dongbin Road, Nanshan School Attached to Beijing Normal University
