= Xinxiu station =

Metro station in Shenzhen, Guangdong, China

Xinxiu 新秀
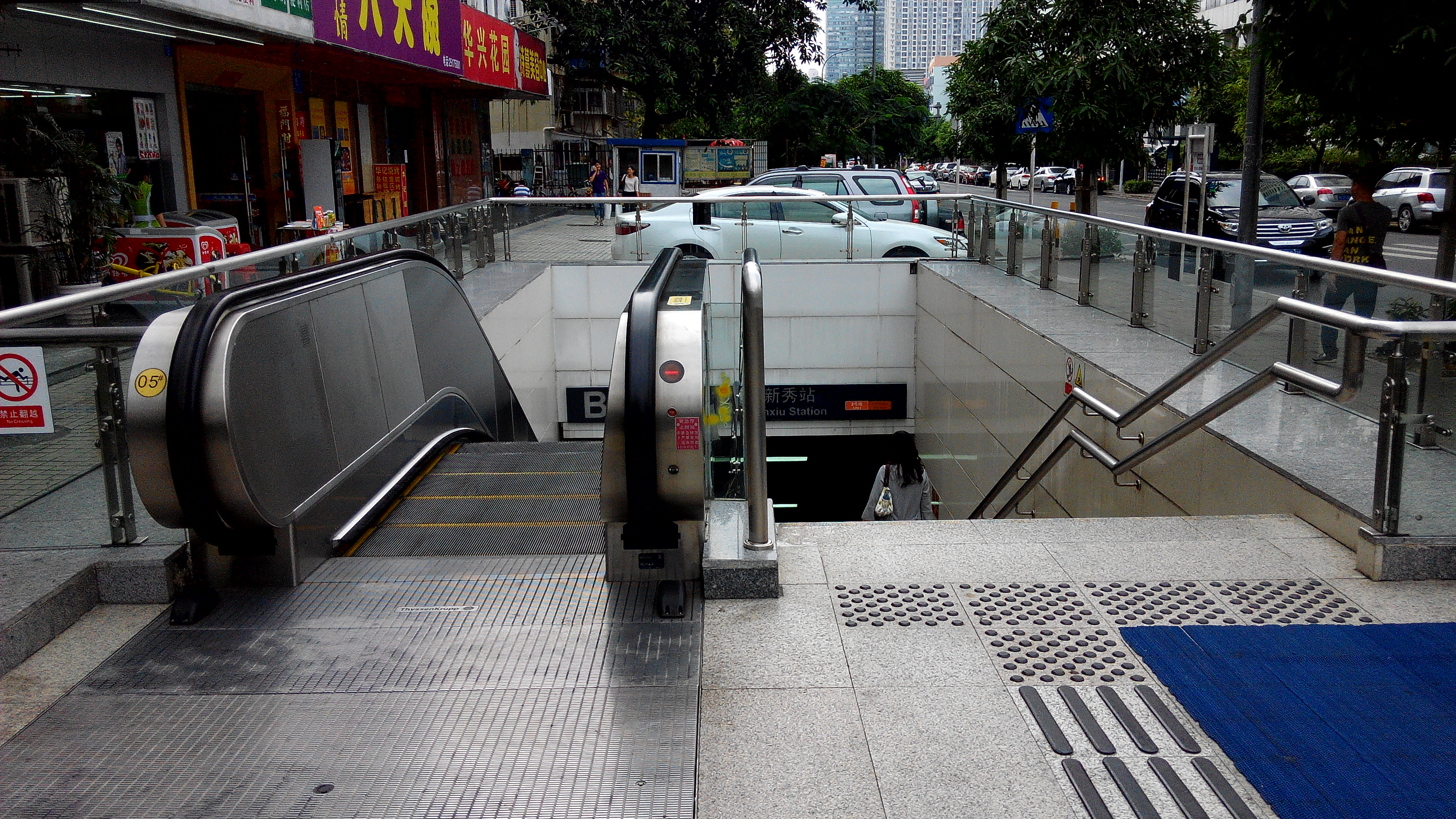
- Exit B

Chinese name
- Chinese: 新秀站
Transcriptions
Standard Mandarin
- Hanyu Pinyin: Xīnxìu Zhàn
Yue: Cantonese
- Jyutping: san1 sau3 zaam6

General information
- Location: Xinxiu Road (国威路) × Luofang Road (罗芳路); Luohu District, Shenzhen, Guangdong; China
- Coordinates: 22°33′2″N 114°8′39″E
- Operator: Shenzhen Metro Group
- Line: Line 2
- Platforms: 2 (1 island platform)
- Tracks: 2

Construction
- Structure type: Underground
- Accessible: Yes

History
- Opened: 28 June 2011

Services
Preceding station	Shenzhen Metro	Following station
Huangbeiling towards Chiwan	Line 2	Liantang Checkpoint towards Liantang (Line 8: Xichong)
Location

Xinxiu (Chinese: 新秀) is a metro station on Line 2 of the Shenzhen Metro. It opened on 28 June 2011. This station served as the terminus of the line until the extension through Line 8 via Liantang to Yantian Road on 28 October 2020.

== Station layout ==
G	Street level	Exit
B1F; Concourse	Lobby	Customer Service, Shops, Vending machines, ATMs
B2F; Platforms	Platform	← Line 2 towards Chiwan (Huangbeiling)
B2F; Platforms	Island platform, doors will open on the left
B2F; Platforms	Platform	Line 8 towards Xichong (Liantang Checkpoint) →

== Entrances/exits ==
- A: Xinxiu Road (W), Luofang Road, Luofang Primary School, Antique Center, Xinxiu Primary School, Xinxiucun, Nanfang Building
- B: Xinxiu Road (E), Luofang West Hill
