= Xiangmei North station =

Metro station in Shenzhen, China

Coordinates: 22°33′14″N 114°2′1″E

Xiangmei North 香梅北
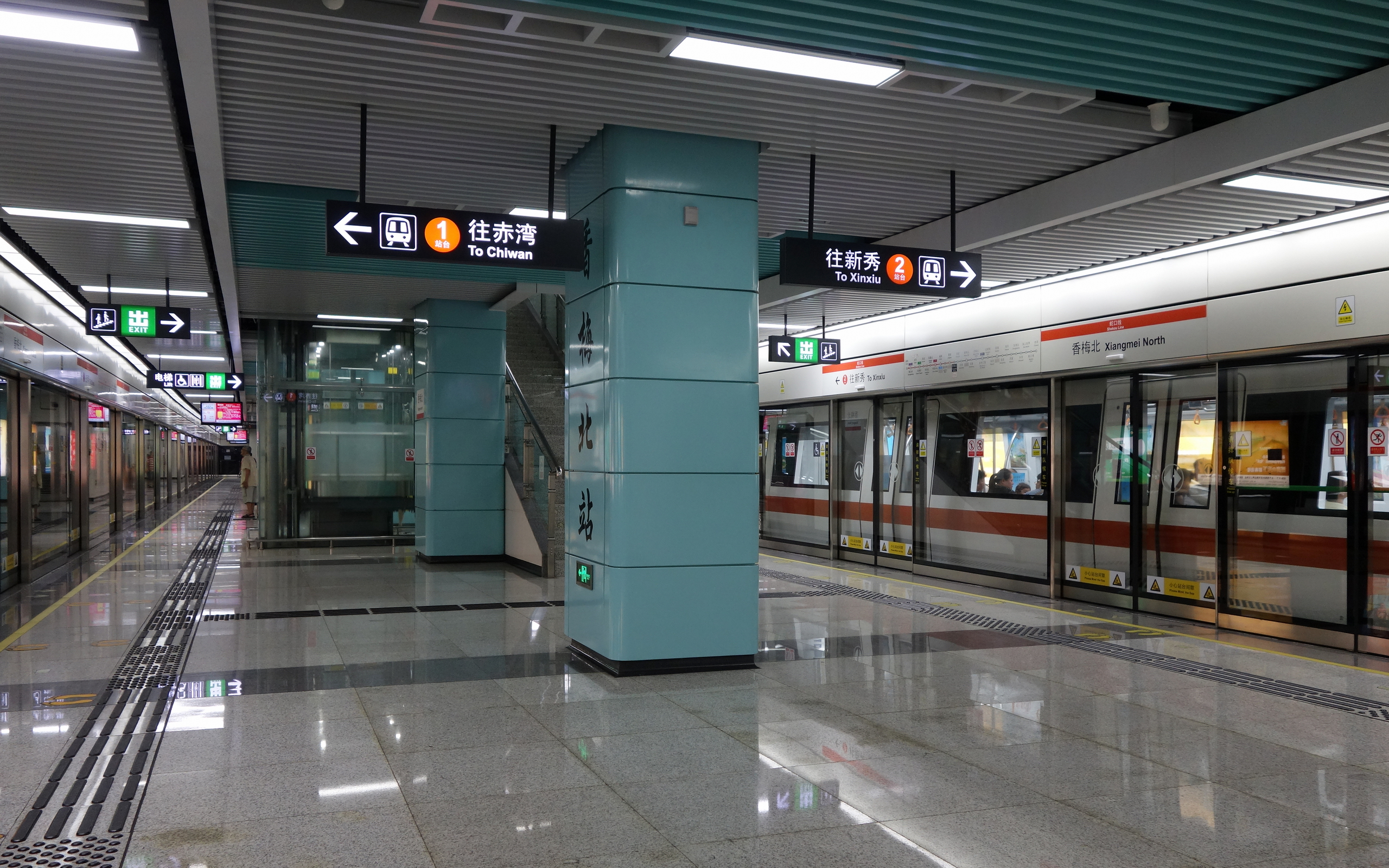

Chinese name
- Chinese: 香梅北
- Literal meaning: Fragrant Blossom North
Transcriptions
Standard Mandarin
- Hanyu Pinyin: Xiāngméi Běi
Yue: Cantonese
- Jyutping: Hoeng1 Mui4 Bak1

General information
- Location: Futian District, Shenzhen, Guangdong; China
- Operator: SZMC (Shenzhen Metro Group)
- Line: Line 2
- Platforms: 2 (1 island platform)
- Tracks: 2

Construction
- Structure type: Underground
- Accessible: Yes

Other information
- Station code: 218

History
- Opened: 28 June 2011 (15 years ago)

Services
Preceding station	Shenzhen Metro	Following station
Xiangmi towards Chiwan	Line 2	Jingtian towards Liantang (Line 8: Xichong)
Route map
Location

Xiangmei North station (Chinese: 香梅北站; pinyin: Xiāngméi Běi Zhàn) is a station on Line 2 and Line 8 of the Shenzhen Metro. It opened on 28 June 2011. It is located in the north-west side of the cross between Qiaoxiang Road and Xiangmei Road.

== Station layout ==
G	-	Exit
B1F; Concourse	Lobby	Customer Service, Shops, Vending machines, ATMs
B2F; Platforms	Platform	← Line 2 towards Chiwan (Xiangmi)
B2F; Platforms	Island platform, doors will open on the left
B2F; Platforms	Platform	Line 8 towards Xichong (Jingtian) →

== Exits ==
Exit		Destination
Exit B	B1	Qiaoxiang Road (N), Tefa Xiaoqü
Exit B	B2	Qiaoxiang Road (S), Xianagmei Road, One Honeylake, Water Flowers, Tianranjü
Exit B	B3	Xiangmei Road, Qiaoxiang Road, Jingtian North Street, Futian Foreign Language School, Sundan
Exit D		Qiaoxiang Road, Xiangmihu Sports Center
