= Shuiwan station =

Metro station in Shenzhen, China

Coordinates: 22°29′18″N 113°55′11″E

Shuiwan 水湾
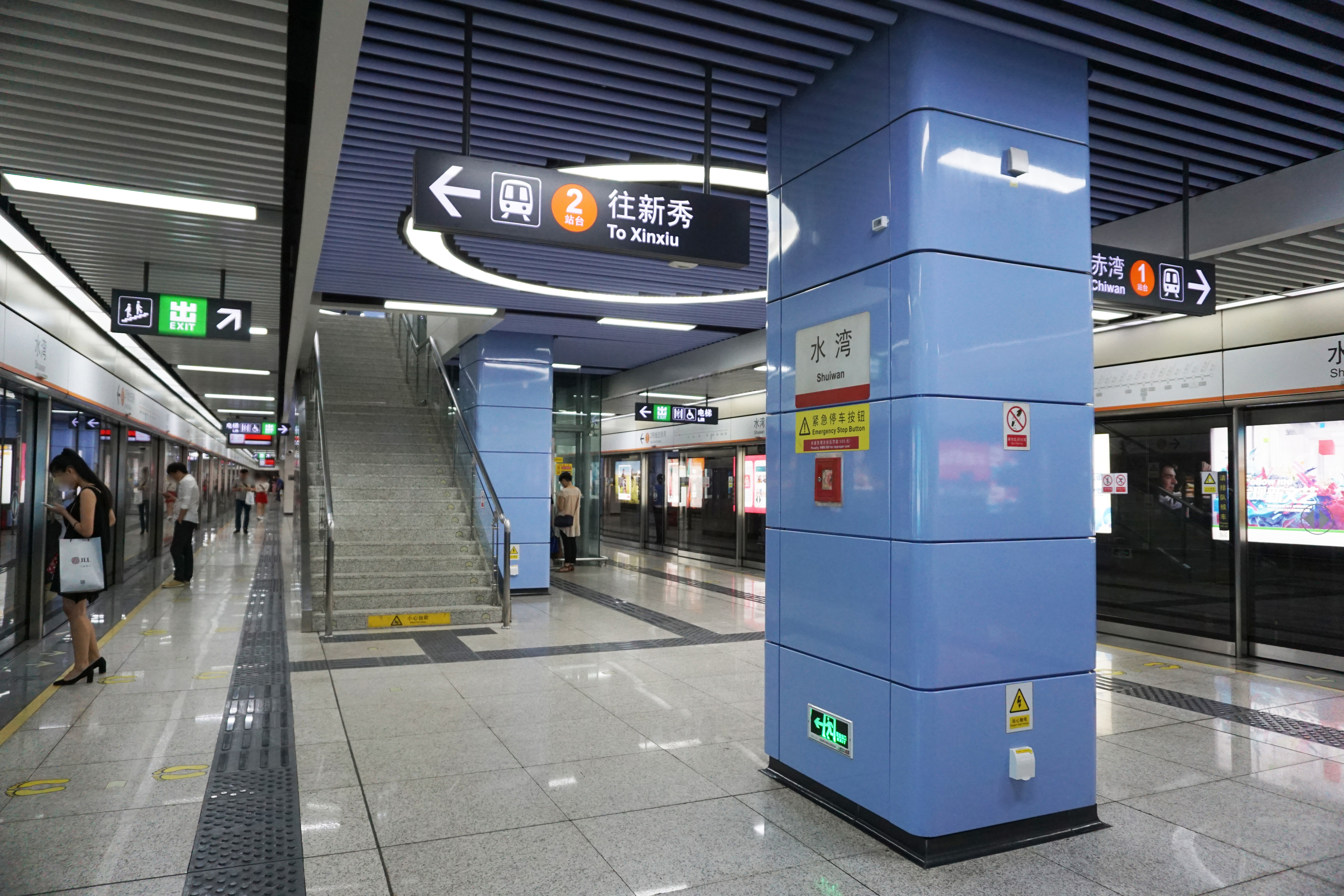

Chinese name
- Traditional Chinese: 水灣
- Simplified Chinese: 水湾
- Literal meaning: Water Bay
Transcriptions
Standard Mandarin
- Hanyu Pinyin: Shuǐ Wān
Yue: Cantonese
- Jyutping: Seoi2 Waan1

General information
- Location: Nanshan District, Shenzhen, Guangdong; China
- Operator: SZMC (Shenzhen Metro Group)
- Line: Line 2
- Platforms: 2 (1 island platform)
- Tracks: 2

Construction
- Structure type: Underground
- Accessible: Yes

Other information
- Station code: 204

History
- Opened: 28 December 2010; 15 years ago

Services
| Preceding station | Shenzhen Metro | Following station |
|---|---|---|
| Sea World towards Chiwan | Line 2 | Dongjiaotou towards Liantang (Line 8: Xichong) |
Route map
Location

Shuiwan station (simplified Chinese: 水湾站; traditional Chinese: 水灣站; pinyin: Shuǐwān Zhàn; Jyutping: Seoi2 Waan1 Zaam6; lit. 'Water Bay station') is a metro station on Line 2 and Line 8 of the Shenzhen Metro. It opened on 28 December 2010.

It caters to people living in the residential developments around Coastal Rose Garden and its vicinity, on Wanghai Road.

== Incident ==
On 17 February 2014, a female IBM project manager fell into the Exit C pedestrian subway. Seven people passing helped rescue her from the subway. Station staff immediately sounded the alarm and called 120. Emergency personnel arrived on the scene nearly 50 minutes after the incident, and she was found dead.

== Station layout ==
| G | - | Exit |
| B1F; Concourse | Lobby | Customer Service, Shops, Vending machines, ATMs |
| B2F; Platforms | Platform | ← Line 2 towards Chiwan (Sea World) |
| B2F; Platforms | Island platform, doors will open on the left |
| B2F; Platforms | Platform | Line 8 towards Xichong (Dongjiaotou) → |

== Exits ==
| Exit | Destination |
|---|---|
| Exit C | Taizi Road (N), Shuiwan Road, Nanshuicun, Shekou TV Station, Shenzhen Nanshan Yucai NO. 1 Primary School, Shenzhen Nanshan Yucai Middle School, Shekou Laojie Street, Huaguoshan |
| Exit D | Taizi Road (N), Haitang Inter-city Bus Station, Liyuan Road, Shekou Science & Technology Building, Huafu Holiday Mansion, Haibin Garden |
