= Line 2 (Shenzhen Metro) =

Metro line in Shenzhen

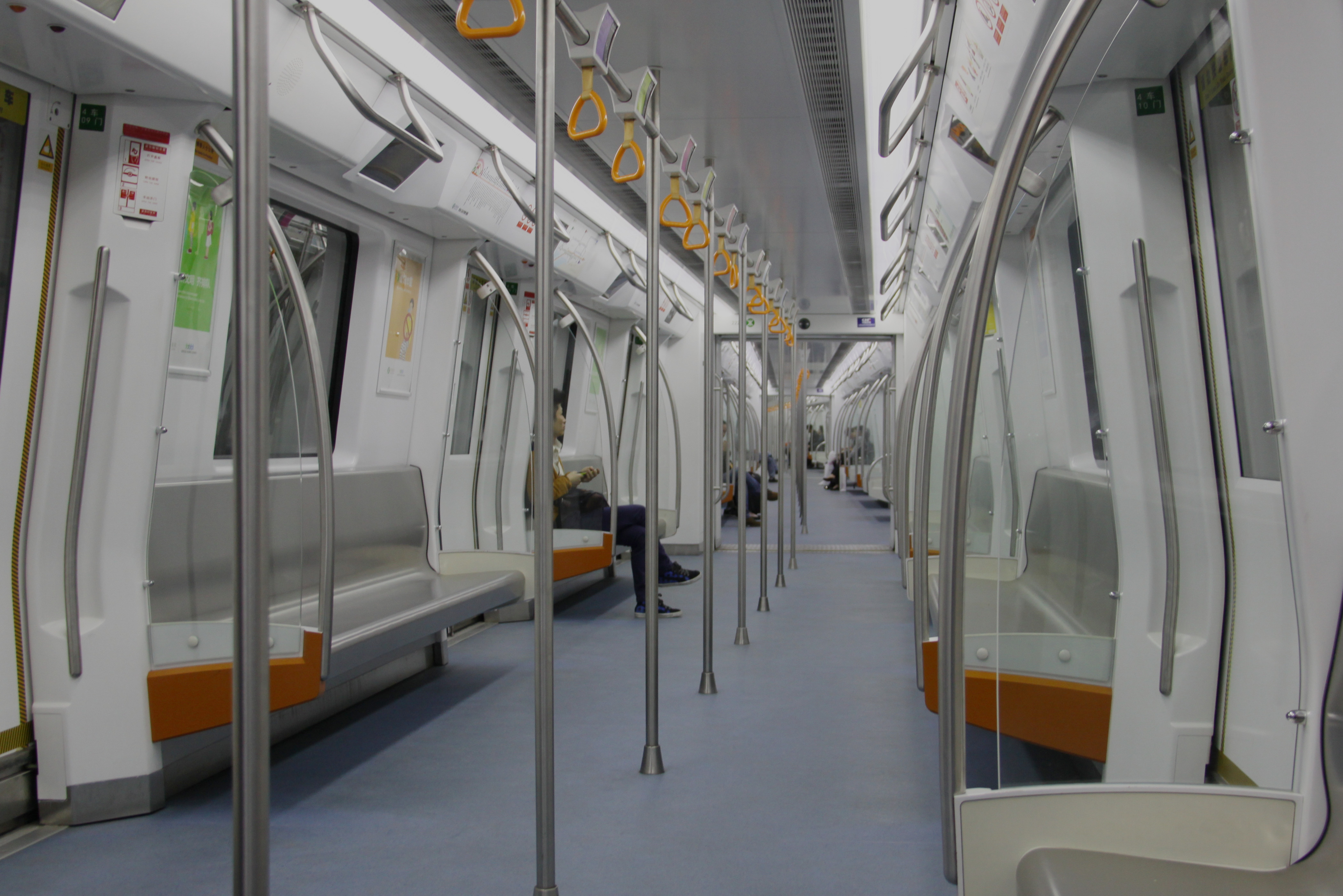
- Interior of CRRC Changchun train

Overview
- Other name(s): Shekou line (蛇口线; 蛇口線; Shékǒu xiàn; Se4 Hau2 Sin3)
- Native name: 二号线; 二號線; Èrhào Xiàn; Ji6 Hou6 Sin3
- Status: Operational
- Locale: Shenzhen, China
- Termini: Chiwan; Liantang
- Stations: 32
- Color on map: Dark Orange (#db6d1c)

Service
- Type: Rapid transit
- System: Shenzhen Metro
- Services: 1
- Operator: SZMC (Shenzhen Metro Group)
- Depot(s): Shekou West depot Houhai stabling yard
- Rolling stock: CRRC Changchun (201–252) (6A); CRRC Zhuzhou (253–257) (6A)
- Daily ridership: 717,000 (2018 Peak)

History
- Opened: 28 December 2010; 15 years ago
- Last extension: 28 October 2020; 5 years ago

Technical
- Line length: 39.6 km (24.61 mi)
- Number of tracks: 2
- Character: Underground
- Track gauge: 1,435 mm (4 ft 8 1/2 in) standard gauge
- Electrification: 1,500 V DC (overhead lines)
- Operating speed: 80 km/h (50 mph)
- Signalling: CBTC Moving block Urbalis 888

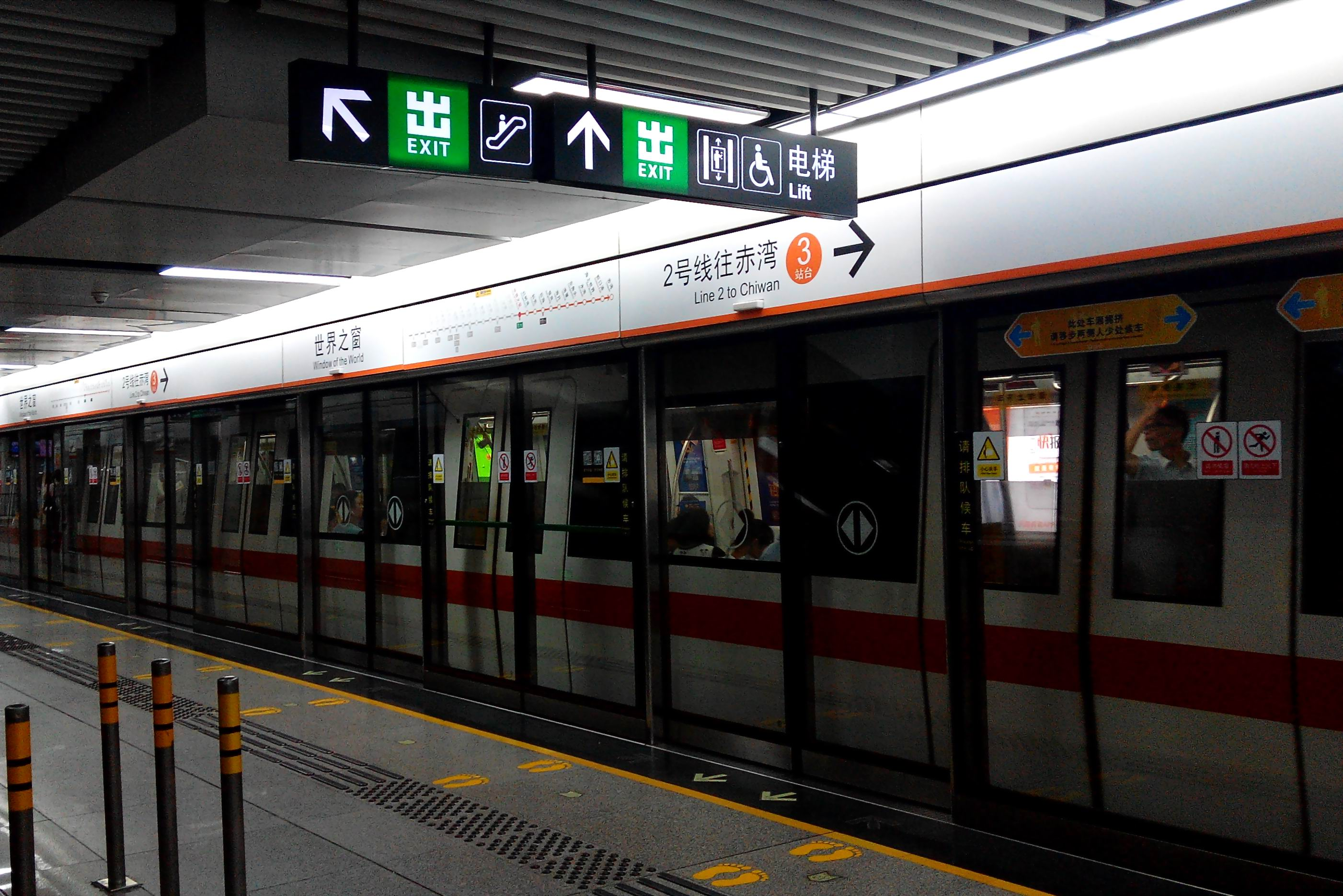
Train exterior

Line 2 (formerly branded as Shekou line) of the Shenzhen Metro runs West–East from Chiwan to Liantang. It opened on 28 December 2010. Line 2 merges into Line 8 at Liantang station, where trains continue service as Line 8 to Xichong station.

== History ==
=== First stage ===
The first section of Line 2 runs from Chiwan to Window of the World, it is 15.514 km (9.640 mi) long, and these 12 stations are all underground. This section opened on 28 December 2010.

=== Second stage ===
The second section runs from Window of the World to Xinxiu, it is 20.65 km (12.83 mi) long, and has 17 stations. The second stage of Line 2 opened on 28 June 2011.

=== Third stage ===
The third section runs from Xinxiu to Liantang, it is 3.82 km (2.37 mi) long, and has 3 stations. The third stage of Line 2 opened on 28 October 2020.

=== Timeline ===
Segment	Commencement	Length	Station(s)	Name
Chiwan — Window of the World	28 December 2010	15.514 km (9.64 mi)	12	Phase 1
Window of the World — Xinxiu	28 June 2011	20.266 km (12.59 mi)	17	Phase 2
Xinxiu — Liantang	28 October 2020	3.82 km (2.37 mi)	3	Phase 3

== Service routes ==
- Chiwan — Xichong (trains are through service with Line 8 after Liantang)
- Wanxia — Liantang (Working days peak hours only)

== Stations ==
Service routes		Station name		Connections	Nearby bus stops	Distance km		Location
Service routes		English	Chinese	Connections	Nearby bus stops	Distance km		Location
●		Chiwan	赤湾	5	79 80 B945 M489 N4 N8	0.00	0.00	Nanshan
●		Shekou Port	蛇口港		22 70 79 80 113 122 204 226 233 328 331 332 K105 K113 K204 M371 M400 M409 M430 M448 N4 N8	1.85	1.85	Nanshan
●		Sea World	海上世界	12	37 122 204 226 233 328 331 332 B816 K105 K113 K204 M371 M400 M409 M430 M448 M493 M519 N4 N4区间 Airport 10（机场10） Q-H 8（前海行8）	1.10	2.95	Nanshan
●		Shuiwan	水湾		204 226 233 331 K105 K204 M241 M371 M400 M430 M519 N4 N4区间 Q-H 8（前海行8）	0.62	3.57	Nanshan
●		Dongjiaotou	东角头	13	22 37 72 79 80 B737 M241 M519 N8 Peak-time 7（高峰7） Seaside Leisure Line	1.20	4.77	Nanshan
●	●	Wanxia	湾厦		M493	1.55	6.32	Nanshan
●	●	Haiyue	海月		B737 B817 M418 M430	0.75	7.07	Nanshan
●	●	Dengliang	登良		M474	1.02	8.09	Nanshan
●	●	Houhai	后海	11 13	229 B964 M299 M429 M467 M474 M483 M493 M519 N24 Peak-time 10（高峰10）	0.95	9.04	Nanshan
●	●	Keyuan	科苑	13	72 B682 B964 E19 M299 M429 M474 Peak-time 10（高峰10） Peak-time 92（高峰92） Peak-time 94（高峰94） Peak-time 120（高峰120） Peak-time 121（高峰121） Peak-time 122（高峰122） Peak-time 138（高峰138）	1.35	10.39	Nanshan
●	●	Hongshuwan	红树湾		58 B795 B911 M313 M355 M486 M487 Peak-time 30（高峰30） Peak-time 135（高峰135）	2.25	12.64	Nanshan
●	●	Window of the World	世界之窗	1	21 26 32 42 43 66 70 79 90 101 113 123 204 209 222 223 234 323 324 327 338 365 369 373 383 390 392 392区间 395 B795 E10 K578 M222 M372 M388 M398 M413 M425 M433 M435 M448 M486 M487 M488 N4 N4区间 N6 N24 Peak-time 8（高峰8） Peak-time 12（高峰12） Peak-time 74（高峰74） Peak-time 93（高峰93） Peak-time 134（高峰134） Sightseeing 1（观光1） Sightseeing 4（观光4）	1.80	14.44	Nanshan
●	●	Qiaocheng North	侨城北		72 104 237 325 326 390 B706 B729 M486 Peak-time 62（高峰62） Peak-time 119（高峰119）	2.25	16.69	Nanshan
●	●	Shenkang	深康		70 72 M500 N24	1.20	17.89	Futian
●	●	Antuo Hill	安托山	7	374	0.80	18.69	Futian
●	●	Qiaoxiang	侨香		45 73 104 323 325 B611 B729 B968 M222 M312 M398 Peak-time 12（高峰12）	0.88	19.57	Futian
●	●	Xiangmi	香蜜		45 73 104 316 323 325 B689 M312 M369 M398 Peak-time 38（高峰38）	1.05	20.62	Futian
●	●	Xiangmei North	香梅北	22	38 41 45 73 104 316 323 325 B689 E12 M312 M369 M398 M441 Peak-time 38（高峰38）	1.00	21.62	Futian
●	●	Jingtian	景田	9	11 21 38 41 45 73 79 104 213 222 316 323 328 365 B613 E12 M369 M391 M392 N6	1.00	22.62	Futian
●	●	Lianhua West	莲花西		14 38 41 46 60 65 71 73 107 108 111 215 235 236 237 322 324 325 374 383 B613 K105 K359 M372 M390 M488 M499 N9 Peak-time 19（高峰19） Peak-time 38（高峰38） Peak-time 123（高峰123）	1.37	23.99	Futian
●	●	Futian	福田	3 11 GSH NZQ	9 32 38 60 71 101 107 113 123 204 223 234 235 236 320 326 327 330/Airport 1（机场1） 374 395 398 B613 B709 E18 E28 K204 K318 K578 M221 M262 M363 M390 M413 M414 M435 M447 M448 N3 N4 N4区间 N9 Peak-express 18（高快18） Peak-express 20（高快20） Peak-time 15（高峰15） Peak-time 18（高峰18） Peak-time 38（高峰38） Peak-time 49（高峰49） Peak-time 58（高峰58） Peak-time 62（高峰62） Peak-time 119（高峰119） Peak-time 134（高峰134） Sightseeing 1（观光1）	0.95	24.94	Futian
●	●	Civic Center	市民中心	4	34 38 60 64 326 371 373 398 E28 M347 M390 M435 M454 M459 M500 N3 N9 Peak-express 18（高快18） Peak-express 26（高快26） Peak-time 17（高峰17）	0.88	25.82	Futian
●	●	Gangxia North	岗厦北	10 11 14	101 113 204 223 303 320 326 M102 M103 M106 M133 M190 M447 M448 Peak-express 47（高快47）Peak-express 60（高快60）Peak-time 3（高峰3）Peak-time 49（高峰49）Peak-time 119（高峰119）Peak-time 221（高峰221）	0.75	26.57	Futian
●	●	Huaqiang North	华强北	7; 1 (via Huaqiang Road) (Note: Out-of-station virtual transfer to Line 1 at Huaqiang Road. This transfer will be counted as two separate journeys requiring two fares.)	65 67 75 80 302区间 M202 M389 M476 Peak-time 119（高峰119）	1.75	28.32	Futian
●	●	Yannan	燕南		65 80 M389 M476	0.75	29.07	Futian
●	●	Grand Theater	大剧院	1 5; 9 11 (via Hongling South) (Note: Out-of-station virtual transfer to Line 9 at Hongling South. This transfer will be counted as two separate journeys requiring two fares.)	3 10 12 29 85 101 103 104 113 203 204 214 215 223 302 E8 K113 K204 M481 N3 N4 Sightseeing 1（观光1） Sightseeing 2（观光2）	1.60	30.67	Luohu
●	●	Hubei	湖贝	5 (OSI)	2 10 17 29 85 104 205 214 220 223 K113 M290 M373 M383 N21 Peak-time 73（高峰73） Sightseeing 1（观光1）	1.85	32.52	Luohu
●	●	Huangbeiling	黄贝岭	5	10 27 69 85 111 205 220 223 336 363 381 382 387 E26 K113 M290 M348 M383 M445 M511 N14 N18 N21 Dameisha-holiday 1（大梅沙假日1） Peak-time 32（高峰32） Peak-time 58（高峰58） Peak-time 97（高峰97）Sightseeing 1（观光1）	1.20	33.72	Luohu
●	●	Xinxiu	新秀		85 111 B621 M133	1.35	35.07	Luohu
●	●	Liantang Checkpoint	莲塘口岸		27 57 69 85 111 113 218 220 308 381 B621 E11 E26 M102 M103 M133 M182 M199 M205 M207 M348 M364 M383 M437 M468 M526 M555 Peak-time 33（高峰33）	1.1	36.17	Luohu
●	●	Xianhu Road	仙湖路		27 57 113 220 B621 M102 M468	1.9	38.07	Luohu
●	●	Liantang	莲塘	8 (through service)	27 57 113 381 B621 B625 M207 M468	0.9	38.97	Luohu
through train to Xichong via Line 8

== Rolling stock ==
Type	Date of manufacture	Series	Sets	Serial number	Assembly	Notes
Type A	2010–2011	Type A stock	35	201–235	Tc+Mp+M+M+Mp+Tc	Manufactured by Changchun Railway Vehicles, Bombardier MITRAC traction system
Type A	2012–2015	Type A stock	16	236–251	Tc+Mp+M+M+Mp+Tc	Manufactured by Changchun Railway Vehicles, Bombardier MITRAC traction system (236–239、241–251) and CRRC Qingdao Sifang traction system (240)
Type A	2019	Type A stock	6	252–257	Tc+Mp+M+M+Mp+Tc	Manufactured by CRRC Zhuzhou Electric Locomotive Works
Type A	2025-2026	Type A stock	9	282–290	Tc+Mp+M+M+Mp+Tc	Manufactured by CRRC Zhuzhou Electric Locomotive Works

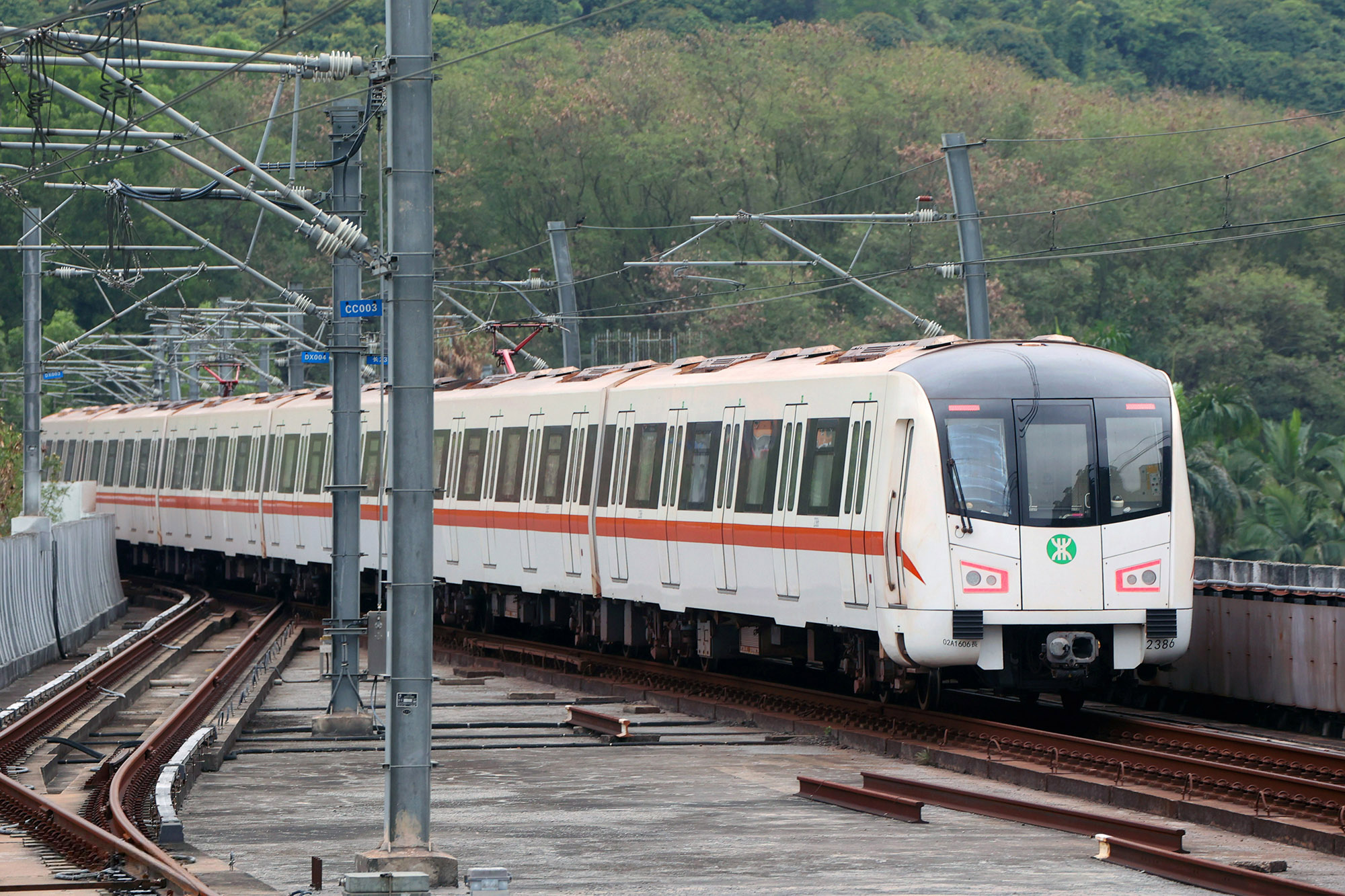
Changchun Railway Vehicles train

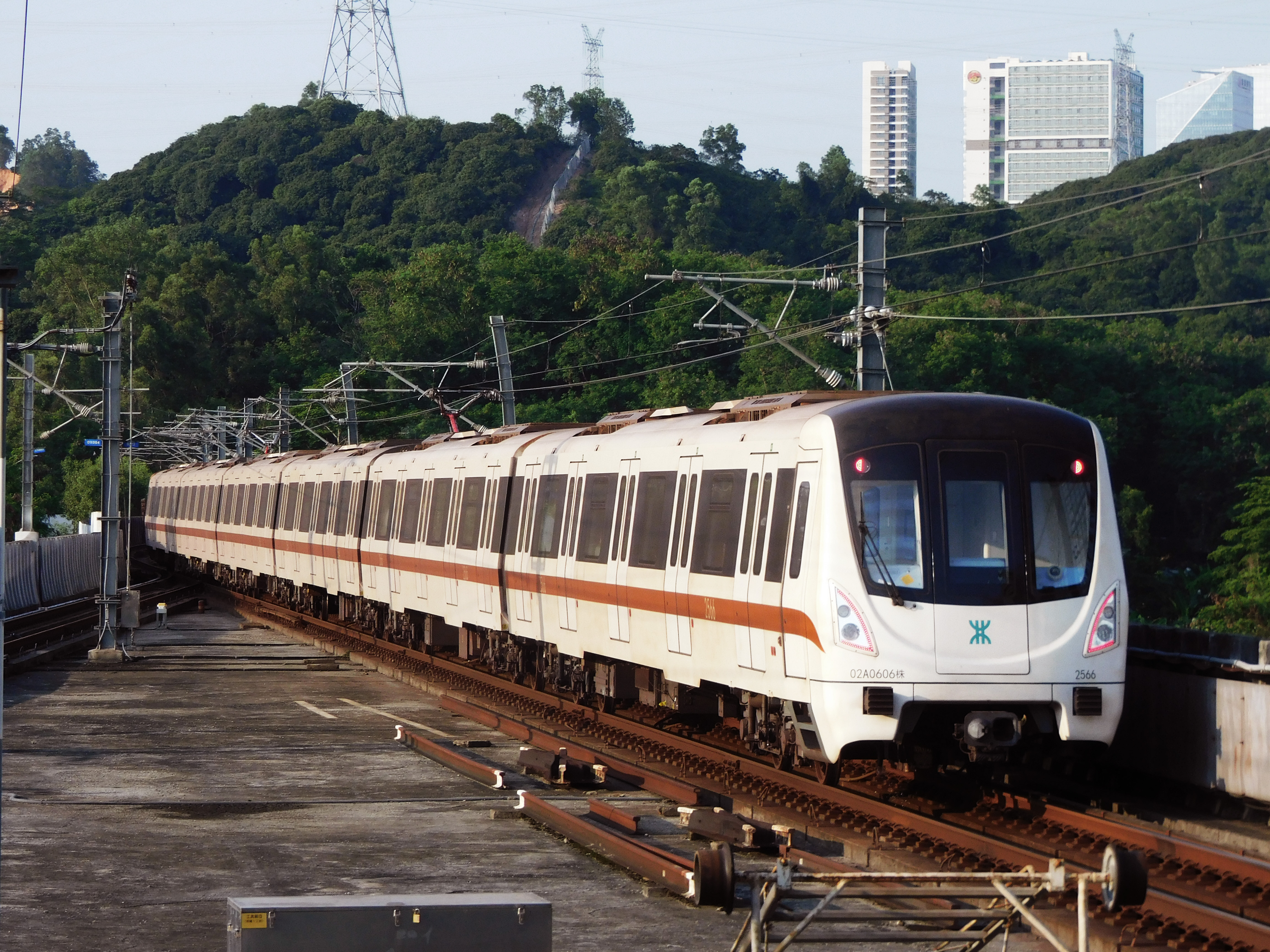
CRRC Zhuzhou Electric Locomotive Works train
