= Xianhu Road station =

Metro station in Shenzhen, Guangdong, China

Xianhu Road 仙湖路
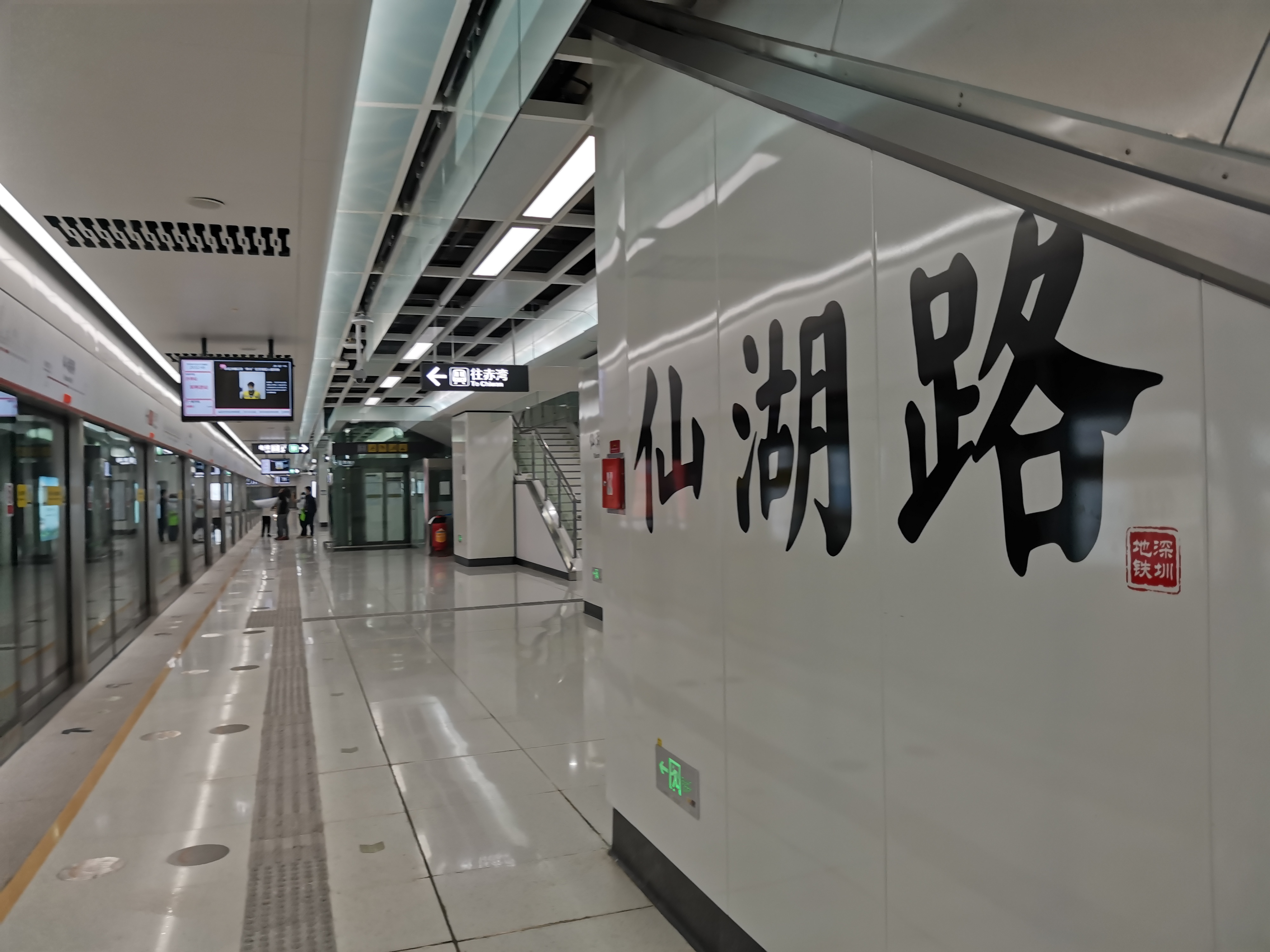
- Platform

Chinese name
- Chinese: 仙湖路站
Transcriptions
Standard Mandarin
- Hanyu Pinyin: Xiānhú Lù Zhàn

General information
- Location: Guowei Road (国威路) × Xianhu Road; Luohu District, Shenzhen, Guangdong; China
- Coordinates: 22°34′0.0″N 114°9′39.6″E
- Operator: Shenzhen Metro Group
- Line: Line 2
- Platforms: 2 (1 island platform)
- Tracks: 2

Construction
- Structure type: Underground
- Accessible: Yes

History
- Opened: 28 October 2020

Services
Preceding station	Shenzhen Metro	Following station
Liantang Checkpoint towards Chiwan	Line 2	Liantang Terminus
Location

Xianhu Road (Chinese: 仙湖路) is a station on Line 2 of the Shenzhen Metro. It opened on 28 October 2020.

== Station layout ==
G	Street level	Exit
B1F; Concourse	Lobby	Customer Service, Shops, Vending machines, ATMs
B2F; Platforms	Platform	← Line 2 towards Chiwan (Liantang Checkpoint)
B2F; Platforms	Island platform, doors will open on the left
B2F; Platforms	Platform	→ Line 8 towards Xichong (Liantang) →

== Entrances/exits ==
- A1 & A2: East side of Xianhu Rd (S), Jucai Rd, Shenzhen Pengxing Experimental School, Pengxing Garden Phase 2/3
- B1 & B2: North side of Guowei Rd (E), Liantang Sub-District Office, Shenzhen Liantang Primary School, Treasure Washington, Peace Garden Phase 2, Aoxiacun
- C1, C2, C3: West side of Xianhu Rd, north side of Guowei Rd (E), Luohu Foreign Language School, Xianhu Botanical Garden
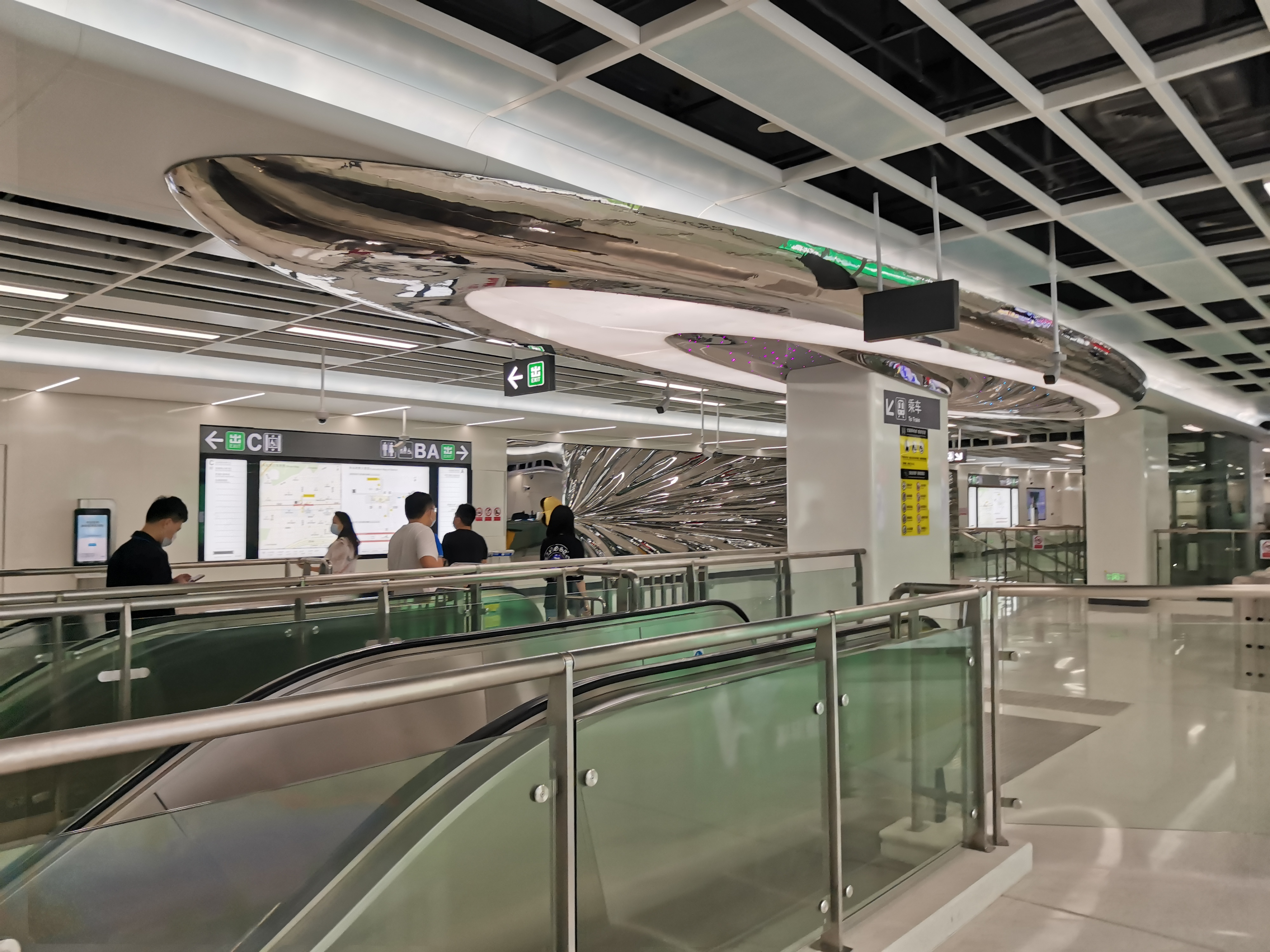
Concourse

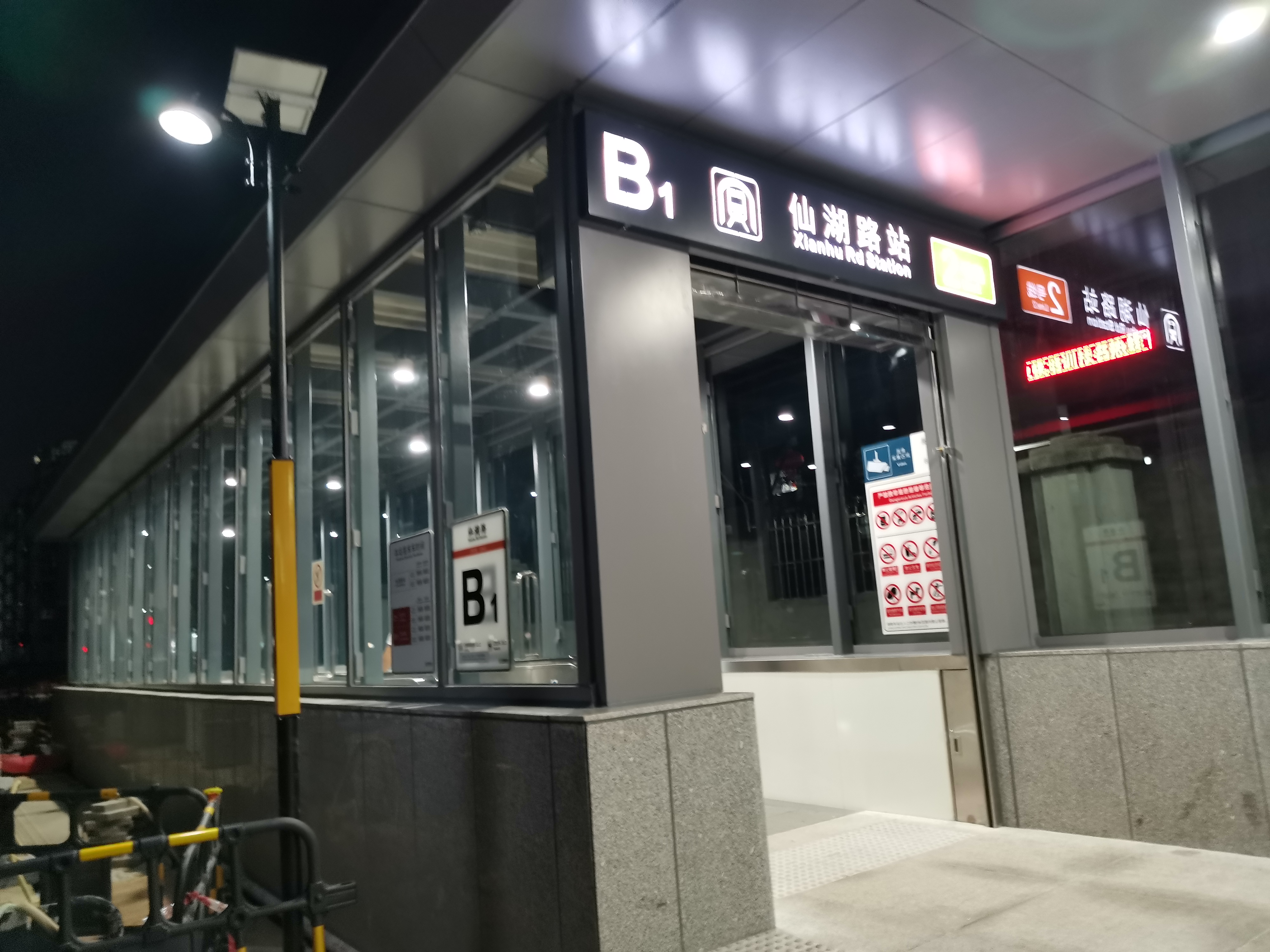
Exit B1
