= Meijing station =

Metro station in Shenzhen, China

Coordinates: 22°33′56″N 114°2′40″E

Meijing 梅景
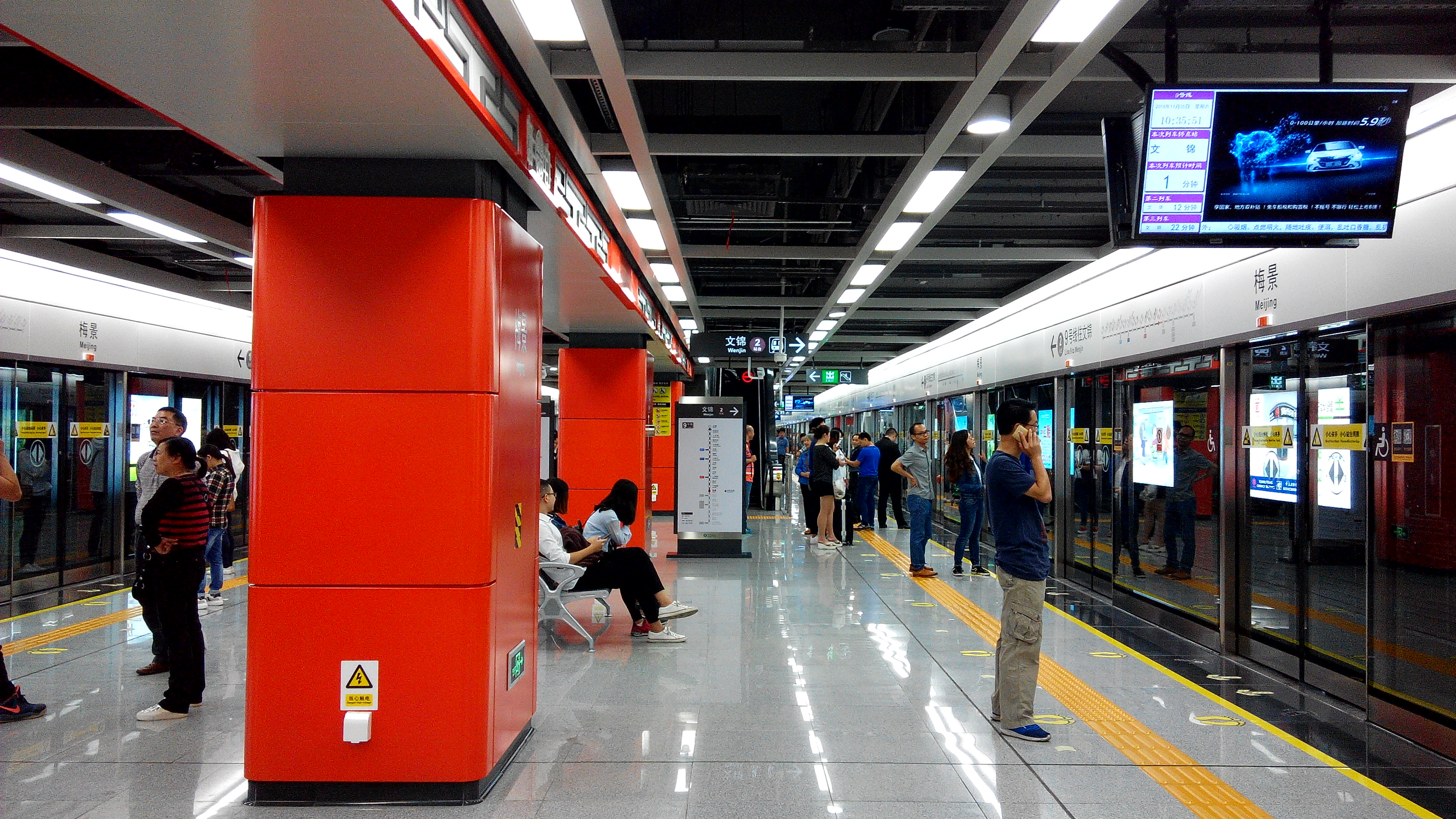

General information
- Location: Futian District, Shenzhen, Guangdong; China
- Operator: SZMC (Shenzhen Metro Group)
- Line: Line 9

History
- Opened: 28 October 2016

Services
Preceding station	Shenzhen Metro	Following station
Xiameilin towards Wenjin	Line 9	Jingtian towards Qianwan
Location

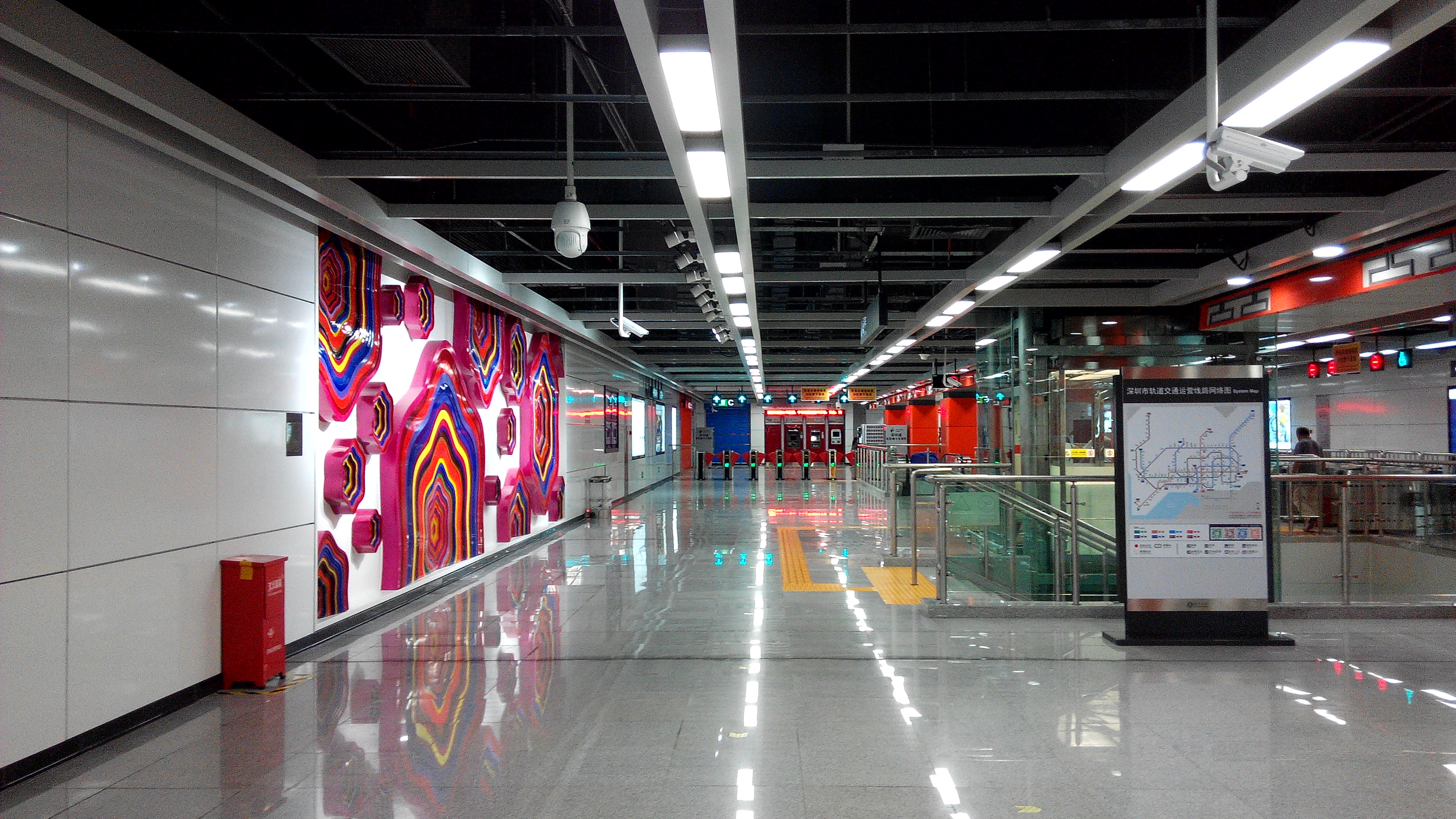
Concourse

Meijing station (Chinese: 梅景站; pinyin: Méijǐng Zhàn; Jyutping: mui4 ging2 zaam6) is a metro station of Shenzhen Metro Line 9. It opened on 28 October 2016.

== Station layout ==
G	-	Exit
B1F; Concourse	Lobby	Customer Service, Shops, Vending machines, ATMs
B2F; Platforms	Platform 1	← Line 9 towards Qianwan (Jingtian)
B2F; Platforms	Island platform, doors will open on the left
B2F; Platforms	Platform 2	→ Line 9 towards Wenjin (Xiameilin) →

== Exits ==
Exit		Destination
Exit A	A1	Beihuan Boulevard (N), Meilin Road (W), Lvjing Hongwan
Exit A	A2	Beihuan Boulevard (S), Jingtian Road, Shenzhen Fuel Building, Ziwei Ge, Zhongshen Building, Kaiyuan Building, GZUCM-Shenzhen Hospital
Exit B		Reserved
Exit C		Meilin Road (W), Xiameilin 1st Street, Shangshu Yuan, Futian Farm Products Wholesale Market
Exit D		Beihuan Boulevard (N), Meilin Road (W), Biyuntian, Meilin Yuan
