= Xiangmei station =

Metro station in Shenzhen, China

Coordinates: 22°33′5″N 114°2′46″E

Xiangmei 香梅
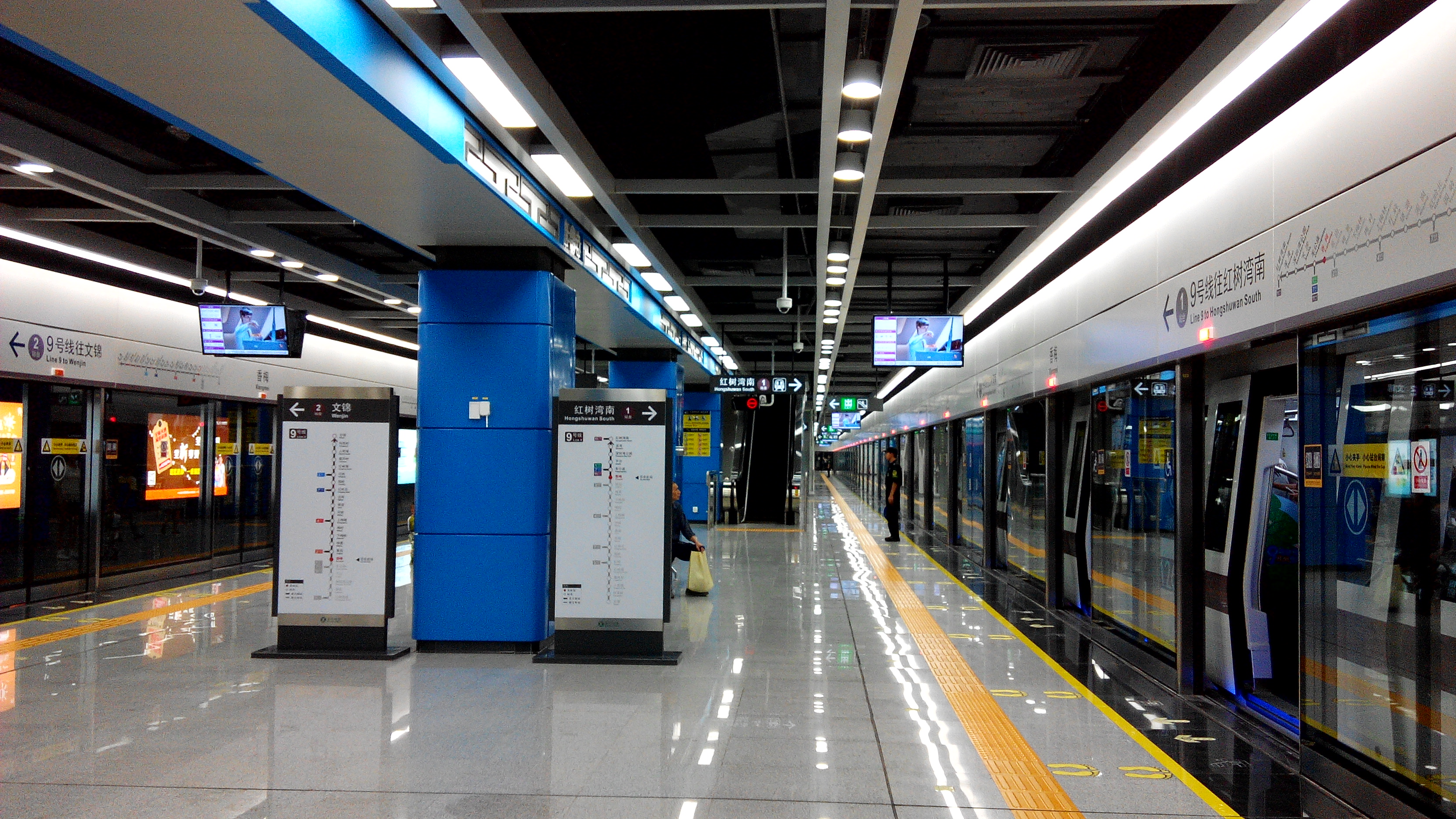

General information
- Location: Futian District, Shenzhen, Guangdong; China
- Operator: SZMC (Shenzhen Metro Group)
- Line: Line 9

History
- Opened: 28 October 2016

Services
Preceding station	Shenzhen Metro	Following station
Jingtian towards Wenjin	Line 9	Chegongmiao towards Qianwan
Location

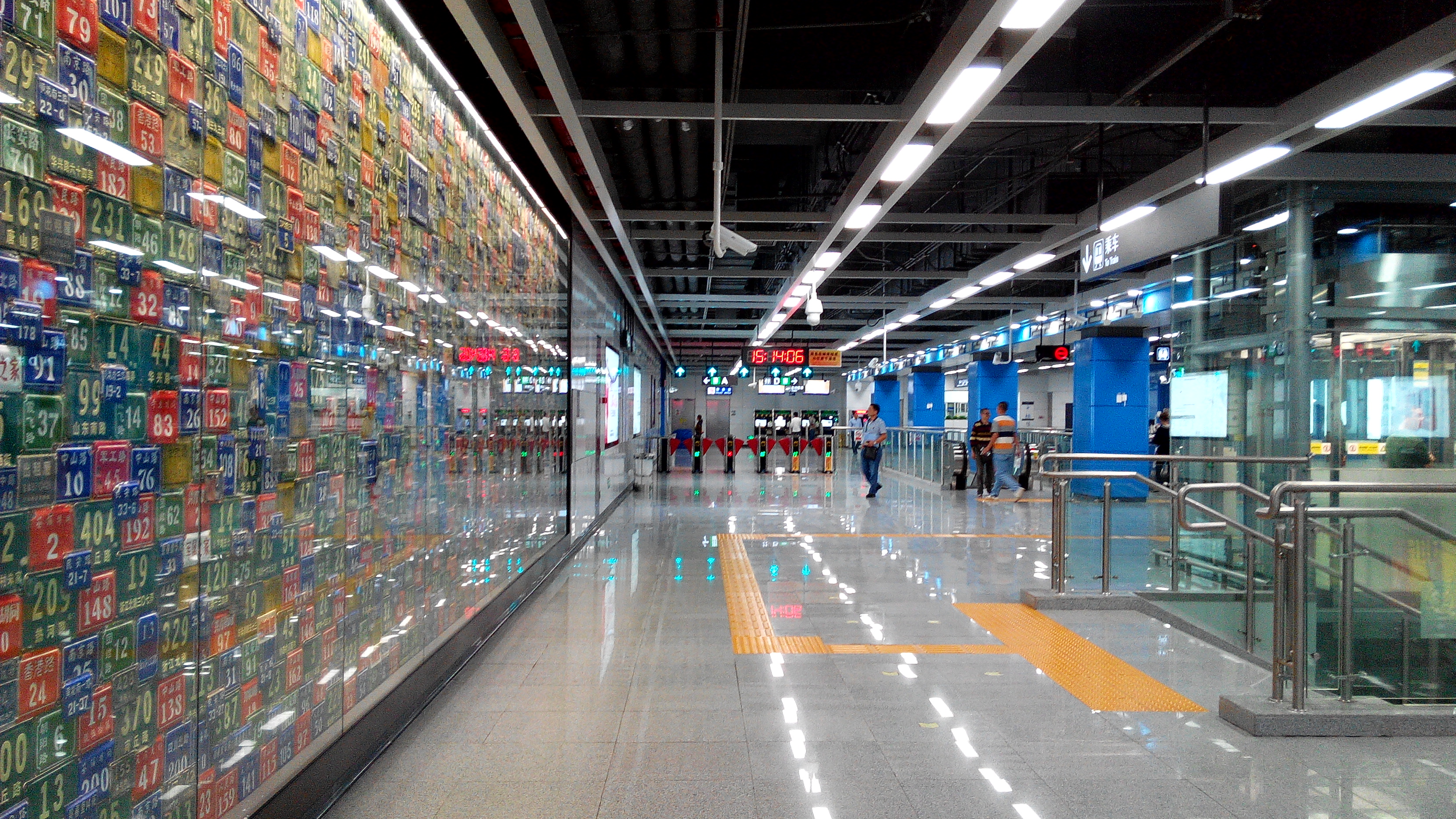
Concourse

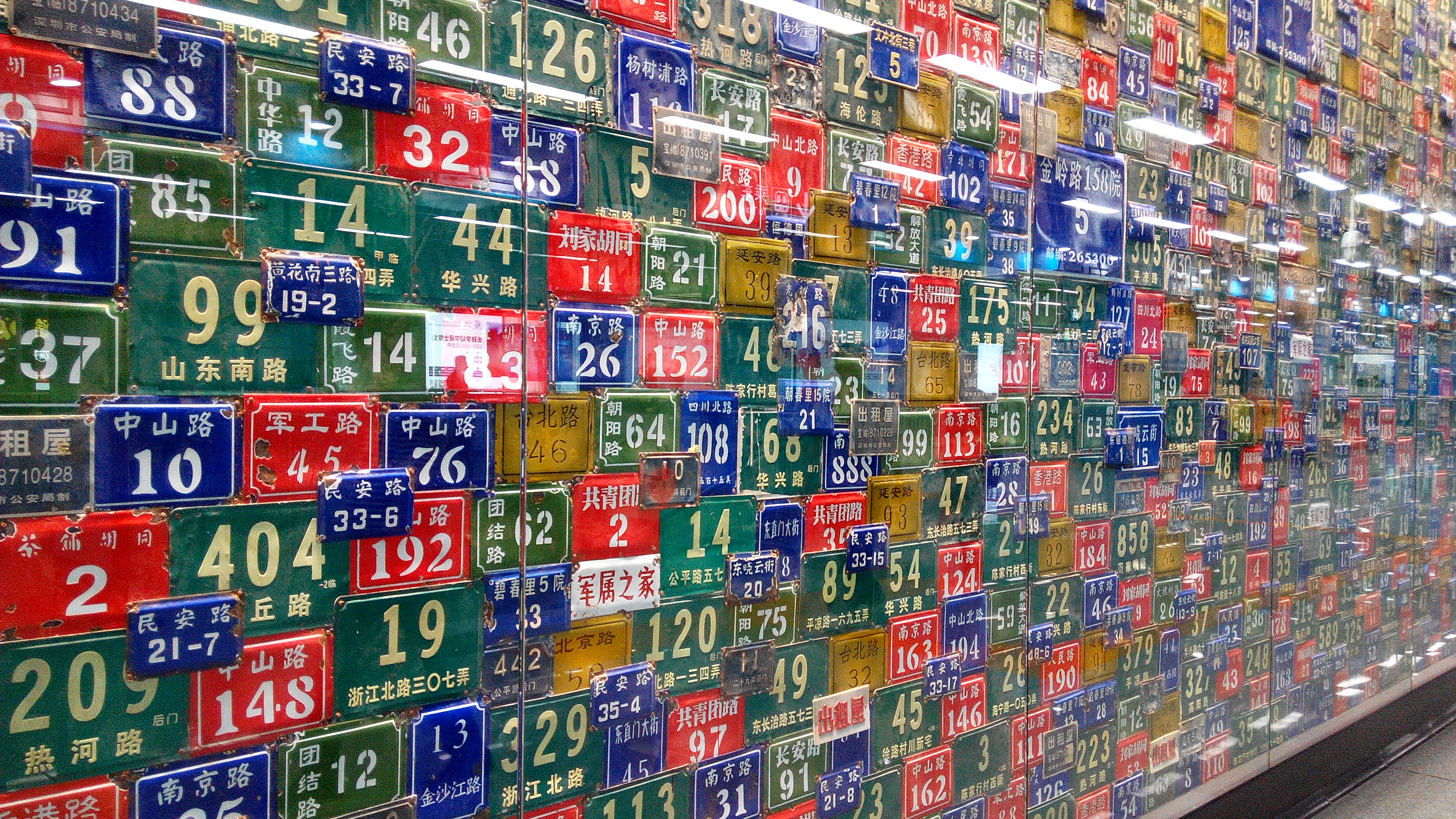
Cultural Wall

Xiangmei station (Chinese: 香梅站; pinyin: Xiāngméi Zhàn; Jyutping: hoeng1 mui4 zaam6) is a metro station of Shenzhen Metro Line 9. It opened on 28 October 2016.

== Station layout ==
G	-	Exit
B1F; Concourse	Lobby	Customer Service, Shops, Vending machines, ATMs
B2F; Platforms	Platform 1	← Line 9 towards Qianwan (Chegongmiao)
B2F; Platforms	Island platform, doors will open on the left
B2F; Platforms	Platform 2	→ Line 9 towards Wenjin (Jingtian) →

== Exits ==
Exit		Destination
Exit A	A1	Hongli West Road (S), Xiangmi South 2nd Street, SUPRC Building, Municipality Oceanic Administration of Shenzhen
Exit A	A2	Hongli West Road (S), Xiangmei Road (W), CIS Commercial Center
Exit B		Hongli West Road (S), Xiangmi Ercun, Tixiang Mingyuan
Exit C		Xiangmei Road (E), Hongli West Road (N), Municipal Administration Building, Municipal Compound, Luban Building
Exit D		Xiangmei Road (W), Hongli West Road (N), Shuixie Huadu, Liyuan Foreign Language Primary School
