= Haiyue station =

Metro station in Shenzhen, China

Coordinates: 22°30′0″N 113°56′17″E

Haiyue 海月
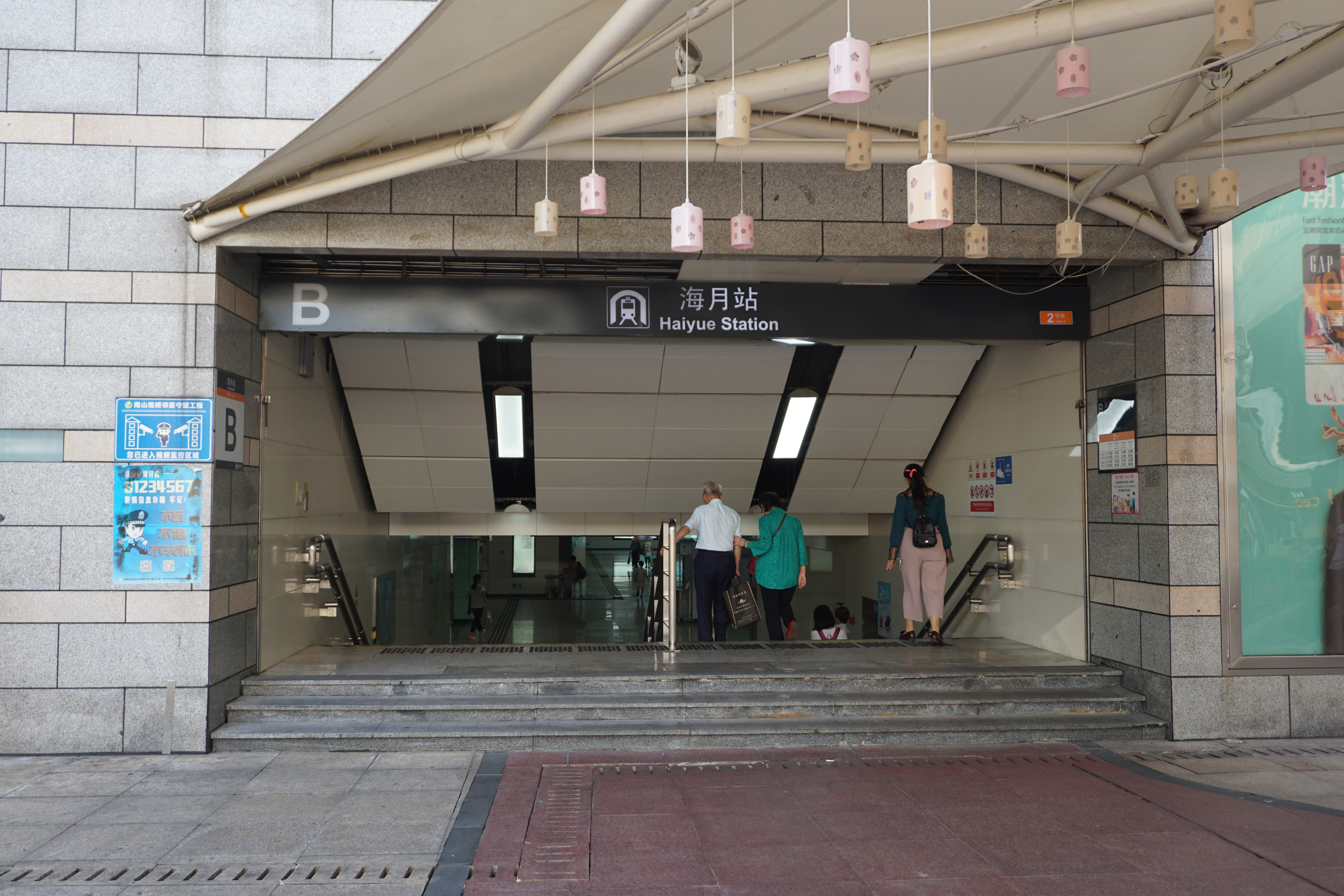

Chinese name
- Chinese: 海月
- Literal meaning: Sea Moon
Transcriptions
Standard Mandarin
- Hanyu Pinyin: Hǎi Yuè
Yue: Cantonese
- Jyutping: Hoi2 Jyut6

General information
- Location: Nanshan District, Shenzhen, Guangdong; China
- Operator: SZMC (Shenzhen Metro Group)
- Line: Line 2
- Platforms: 2 (1 island platform)
- Tracks: 2

Construction
- Structure type: Underground
- Accessible: Yes

Other information
- Station code: 207

History
- Opened: 28 December 2010; 15 years ago

Services
Preceding station	Shenzhen Metro	Following station
Wanxia towards Chiwan	Line 2	Dengliang towards Liantang (Line 8: Xichong)
Route map
Location

Haiyue station (Chinese: 海月站; pinyin: Hǎiyuè Zhàn; Jyutping: Hoi2 Jyut6 Zaam6; lit. 'Sea Moon station') is a metro station on Line 2 and Line 8 of the Shenzhen Metro. It opened on 28 December 2010.

== Station layout ==
G	-	Exit
B1F; Concourse	Lobby	Customer Service, Shops, Vending machines, ATMs
B2F; Platforms	Platform	← Line 2 towards Chiwan (Wanxia)
B2F; Platforms	Island platform, doors will open on the left
B2F; Platforms	Platform	Line 8 towards Xichong (Dengliang) →

== Exits ==
Exit	Destination
Exit A	Houhaibin Road (E), Gongye 8th Road (S), All City
Exit B	Houhaibin Road (E), Gongye 8th Road (N), Shenzhenwan Checkpoint, All City
Exit C	Houhaibin Road (W), Houhai Primary School, Gongye 8th Road (N), Shenzhenwan Checkpoint
Exit D	Houhaibin Road (W), Gongye 8th Road (S), Yucai Third Middle School, No. 4 Primary School of Yucai Education Group, Tianjiao Huating, Helen Garden Phase III & V, Huabanli, Airong Road, Gongyuan Road, Sihai Park, The Rosary, Nanyou Building, Gongye 7th Road
