= Jellyfish (disambiguation) =

Jellyfish are marine invertebrates.

For their preparation as food, see Jellyfish as food.

Jellyfish may also refer to:

== Places ==
- Jellyfish Lake, a dive site in the Pacific island of Palau

== Media and entertainment ==
=== Music ===
- Jellyfish (band), American rock band formed in San Francisco in 1989

==== Songs ====
- "Jellyfish" (Sigrid song), 2025
- "Jellyfish" (Slowly Slowly song), 2019
- "Jellyfish", by Local Natives from Sunlit Youth, 2016
- "Jellyfish", by the String Cheese Incident from Born on the Wrong Planet, 1997

=== Films ===
- Jellyfish (2007 film), Israeli drama
- Jellyfish (2018 film), British social realism drama

=== Other uses ===
- Jellyfish.com, online reverse auction website
- Jellyfish Entertainment, South Korean K-pop music company
- Jellyfish (short story collection), by Janice Galloway, 2015
- The Jellyfish, Boum graphic novel, 2022
- Jellyfish, fictional characters in SpongeBob SquarePants

== Other ==
- Space jellyfish, a rocket launch-related phenomenon
