= Liantang station (Shenzhen Metro) =

Metro station in Shenzhen, Guangdong, China

Liantang 莲塘
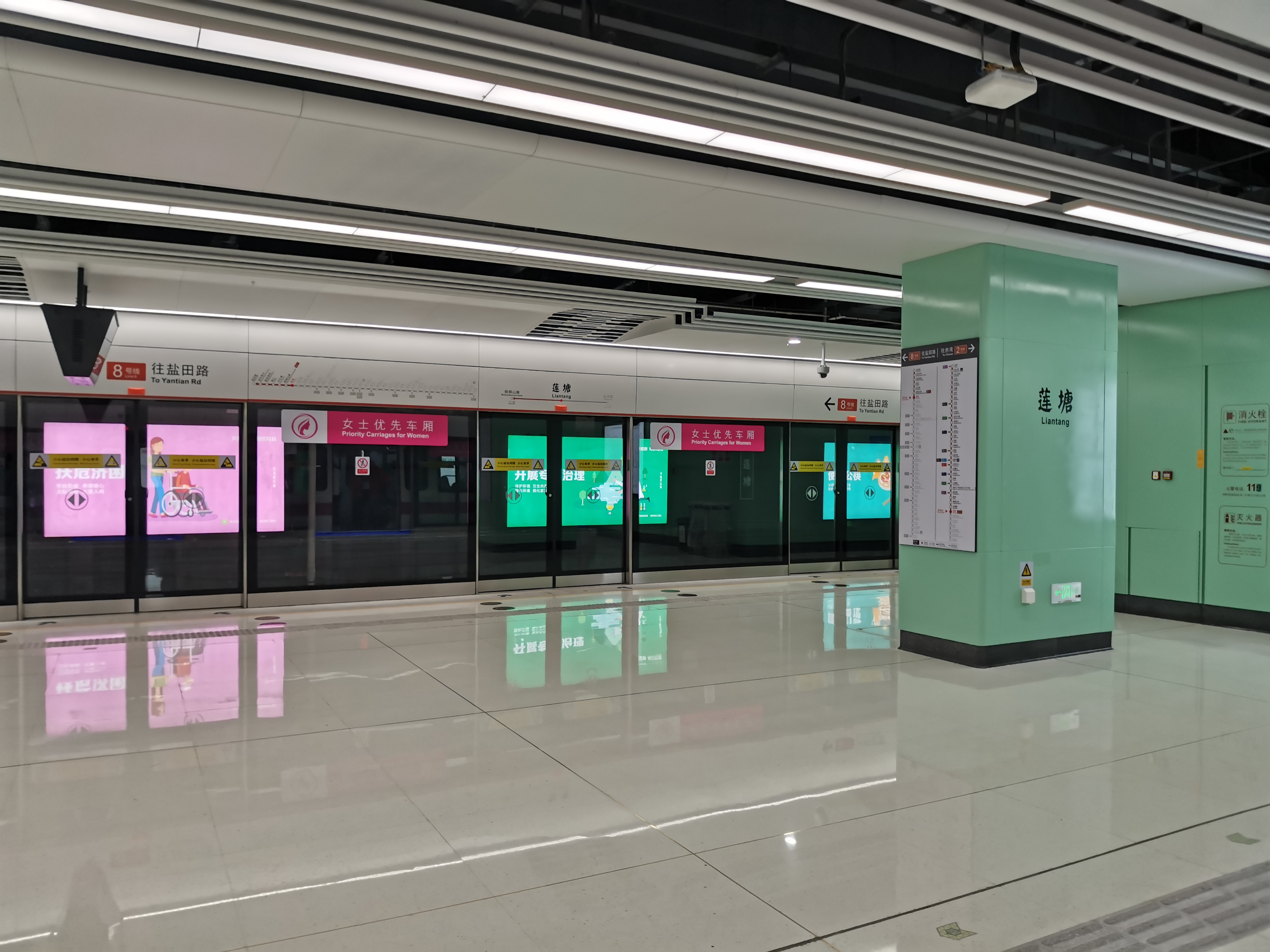
- Platforms

Chinese name
- Simplified Chinese: 莲塘站
- Traditional Chinese: 蓮塘站
Transcriptions
Standard Mandarin
- Hanyu Pinyin: Liántáng Zhàn
Yue: Cantonese
- Jyutping: lin4tong4 zaam6

General information
- Location: Guowei Road (国威路); Luohu District, Shenzhen, Guangdong; China
- Coordinates: 22°34′0.8″N 114°10′8.3″E
- Operator: Shenzhen Metro Group
- Line: Line 2
- Platforms: 2 (1 island platform)
- Tracks: 2

Construction
- Structure type: Underground
- Accessible: Yes

History
- Opened: 28 October 2020

Services
Preceding station	Shenzhen Metro	Following station
Xianhu Road towards Chiwan	Line 2	Wutong Mountain South (Line 8) towards Xichong
Location

Liantang (Chinese: 莲塘) is a metro station on Line 2 of the Shenzhen Metro. It opened on 28 October 2020.

Line 2 merges into Line 8 at this station, with trains on Line 2 continuing service to Xichong and trains on Line 8 continuing service to Chiwan. There is no need for passengers to get off and transfer at this station.

== Station layout ==
G	Street level	Exit
B1F; Concourse	Lobby	Customer Service, Shops, Vending machines, ATMs
B2F; Platforms		← Line 2 towards Chiwan (Xianhu Road)
B2F; Platforms	Island platform, doors will open on the left
B2F; Platforms		Line 8 towards Xichong (Wutong Mountain South) →

== Entrances/exits ==
- A: South side of Guowei Rd, Pangshan Rd, Luohu Hospital of Traditional Chinese Medicine, Xiaowutong Mountain Climbing Center, Huajingyuan, Liannan Primary School (Lianxin Canpus), Royal Court North District, Luosha Rd
- C: North side of Guowei Rd (E), Shenzhen Luohu Foreign Language Junior School
- D: North side of Guowei Rd (W), Yuegang Rd, Liantang Sub-District Office
