= Yangmei Station =

Yangmei Station may refer to:

- Yangmei Station (Taiwan), a railway station in Taiwan
- Yangmei Station (Shenzhen), a station of Shenzhen Metro in Guangdong province, China
