= Changlong station (Shenzhen Metro) =

Metro station in Shenzhen, China

Coordinates: 22°36′30″N 114°6′48″E

Changlong 长龙
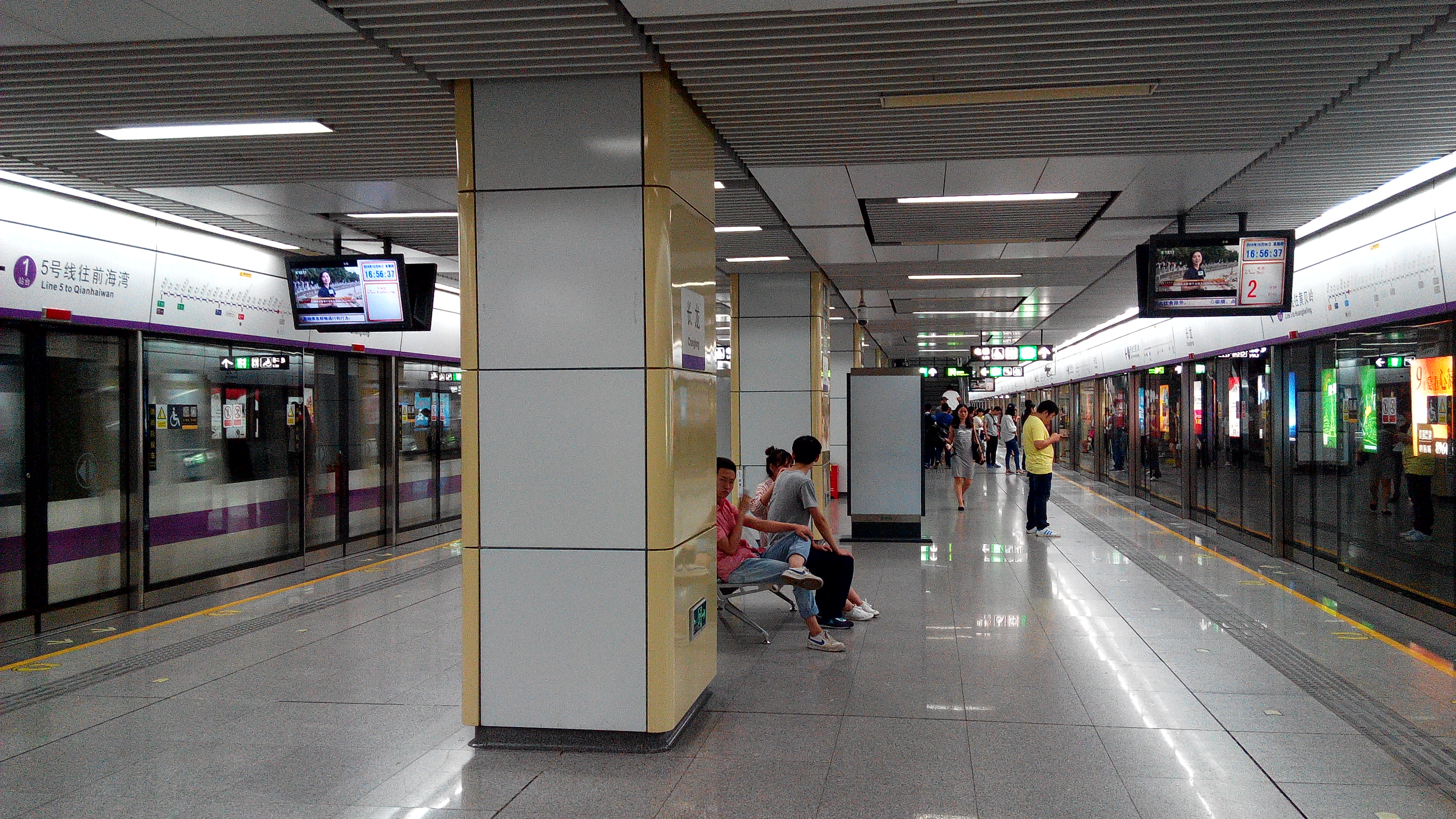
- Changlong Station

Chinese name
- Simplified Chinese: 长龙
- Traditional Chinese: 長龍
- Literal meaning: Long Dragon
Transcriptions

General information
- Location: Longgang District, Shenzhen, Guangdong; China
- Operator: SZMC (Shenzhen Metro Group)
- Line: Line 5

History
- Opened: 22 June 2011

Services
| Preceding station | Shenzhen Metro | Following station |
|---|---|---|
| Buji towards Grand Theater | Line 5 | Xiashuijing towards Chiwan |
Location

Changlong station (simplified Chinese: 长龙站; traditional Chinese: 長龍站; pinyin: Chánglóng Zhàn; Jyutping: coeng^{4} lung^{4} zaam^{6}) is a station on Line 5 of the Shenzhen Metro. It opened on 22 June 2011. This station is in the middle of Jihua Road (Chinese: 吉华路).

== Station layout ==
| G | - | Exit |
| B1F; Concourse | Lobby | Customer Service, Shops, Vending machines, ATMs |
| B2F; Platforms | Platform 1 | ← 5 towards Chiwan (Xiashuijing) |
| B2F; Platforms | Island platform, doors will open on the left |
| B2F; Platforms | Platform 2 | → 5 towards Grand Theater (Buji) → |

== Exits ==
| Exit | | Destination |
|---|---|---|
| Exit A | | Jihua Road (W), Xihuan Road, Wujing Buji Hospital, Liting Haoyuan, Buji Yicun Industrial Area, Culture Exhibition Palace, Dapotou Village, Dapotou Office Block |
| Exit B | | Jihua Road (W), Longgang Second People's Hospital, Longling School, Buji Retired Cadre's Entertainment Center, Huiyang Building, Baolong Garden |
| Exit C | C1 | Jihua Road (N) |
| Exit C | C2 | Jihua Road (S), Buji Middle School, Buji Park, Dexing Town, Changlong Xicun, Meidulan Huating, Longgang Branch Buji Supervision Office of Market Supervision Administration of Shenzhen Municipality, Jinpeng Building, Jida Garden |
| Exit D | | Reserved Exit |
