= Line 5 (Shenzhen Metro) =

Metro line in Shenzhen, China

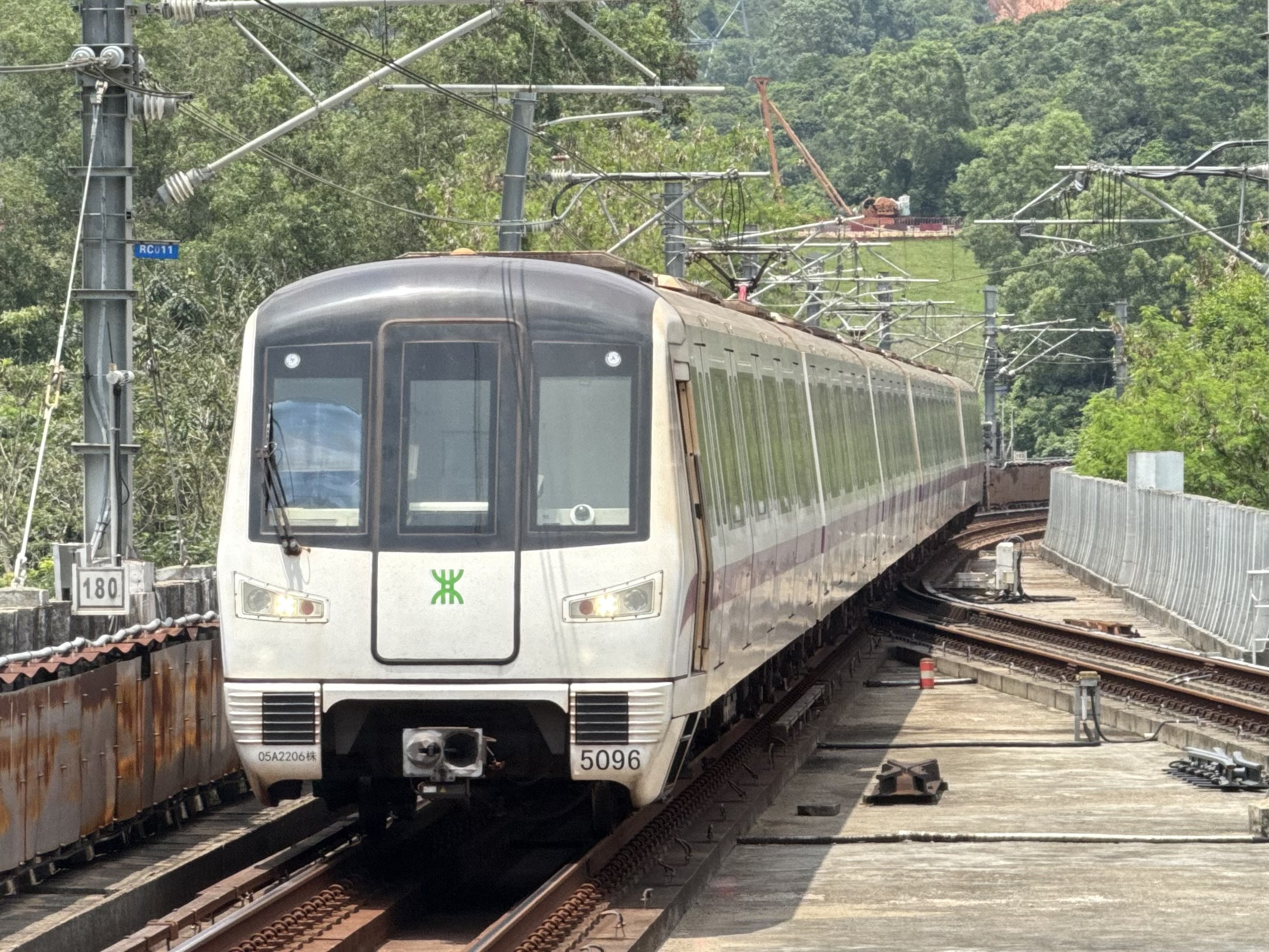
- A CSR Zhuzhou train approaching Changlingpi

Overview
- Other name(s): Huanzhong line (环中线; 環中線; Huánzhōng xiàn; Waan4 Zung1 Sin3)
- Native name: 五号线; 五號線; Wǔhào Xiàn; Ng5 Hou6 Sin3
- Status: Operational
- Locale: Shenzhen, China
- Termini: Chiwan; Grand Theater
- Stations: 37
- Color on map: Purple (#9950b2)

Service
- Type: Rapid transit
- System: Shenzhen Metro
- Services: 1
- Operator: SZMC (Shenzhen Metro Group)
- Depot(s): Tanglang depot Shangshuijing stabling yard
- Rolling stock: CRRC Zhuzhou (501-530、552-557)(6A); CRRC Changchun (531-551)(6A)
- Daily ridership: 1.1 million (March 2021 average); 1.31 million (2020 Peak)

History
- Opened: 22 June 2011; 15 years ago
- Last extension: 28 December 2025; 8 months ago

Technical
- Line length: 50.3 km (31.25 mi)
- Number of tracks: 2
- Character: Underground and Elevated
- Track gauge: 1,435 mm (4 ft 8 1/2 in) standard gauge
- Electrification: 1,500 V DC (Overhead lines)
- Operating speed: 80 km/h (50 mph)
- Signalling: Urbalis 888 CBTC Moving block

Line 5 (formerly branded as the Huanzhong line) of the Shenzhen Metro runs West–East from Chiwan to Grand Theater forming an arc around central Shenzhen. It opened on 22 June 2011. Line 5 is an important east west and orbital line that connects various sub-centers of Shenzhen. This led to Line 5 being heavily used. In 2014, average daily ridership exceeded 500,000 people, with over 1 million passengers using the line on 20 July 2018, setting a new record. Since 2019, Line 5 has surpassed Line 1 as the busiest line in the Shenzhen Metro network. By 2021, the line regularly carries well over 1 million passengers every day and reaching the predicted long term daily passenger volume.

== History ==
=== Phase 1 ===
In 2004, Line 5 was originally envisioned to be an orbital express commuter railway using an upgraded Pinghu–Nanshan railway. In 2006 the line was redesigned to a subway with more frequent stops but still was an orbital route roughly following the Pingnan railway. In July 2007, the line was approved with an expected budget of 19.2 billion RMB (US$3 billion). The line would be 42.391 km (26.341 mi) long, of which 3.62 km (2.25 mi) is elevated, with 29 stations. The number of stations was reduced from 29 to 26 when the line was cut back from Grand Theater to Huangbeiling due to Grand Theater Station being planned to be an interchange between three other lines, making construction difficult. Construction of Line 5 started on 21 December 2007 with an additional station, Shangshuijing, added to the design. On 22 June 2011, Line 5 officially opened between Qianhaiwan and Huangbeiling. The final cost of the first phase was about 20.45 billion RMB (US$3.2 Billion). In initial opening, a fleet of 37 trainsets will be operating on Line 5 serving an expected daily passenger volume of more than 400,000 passengers. In the long-term Line 5 was planned to operate with a fleet of 74 trainsets serving a daily passenger volume of over 1 million passengers.

=== Phase 2 (southern extension) ===
On 6 April 2015, a southern extension towards Chiwan station broke ground. The southern extension is 7.65 km (4.75 mi) in length with 7 stations. This will greatly shorten the travel time between Bao'an, Qianhai and Shekou. As Liwan and Chiwan stations are close to the Dananshan and Xiaonanshan areas and residential neighborhoods, the opening of the extension line will attract more people to the Shekou area and will attract more people to race from Chiwan to Huangbeiling (Line 2 vs Line 5). The extension was opened on 28 September 2019.

=== Remaining section of Phase 1 ===
The section between Huangbeiling to Grand Theater was removed during planning in 2007. However, with passenger growth in subway usage, huge volumes of passengers are transferring westbound between Line 2 and Line 5 at Huangbeiling to reach Line 1 and beyond. By 2021, transfer volumes reached 16,000 passengers per hour during AM peak periods. The environmental assessment of the section was carried out on 25 February 2019 to restart the project and improve capacity in the area. The remaining section of Phase 1 started construction on 13 August 2019. This section is 2.88 km in length with 3 stations and completely parallels Line 2. The extension opened on 28 December 2025.

== Opening timeline ==
| Segment | Commencement | Length | Station(s) | Name |
|---|---|---|---|---|
| Qianhaiwan — Huangbeiling | 22 June 2011 | 40.00 km (24.85 mi) | 27 | Phase 1 |
| Chiwan — Qianhaiwan | 28 September 2019 | 7.65 km (4.75 mi) | 7 | Phase 2 (Southern extension) |
| Huangbeiling — Grand Theater | 28 December 2025 | 2.88 km (1.79 mi) | 3 | Phase 1 (remaining section) |

== Service routes ==
- Chiwan — Grand Theater
- Qianhaiwan — Grand Theater (Working days peak hours only)

== Stations ==
| Service routes | | Station name | | Connections | Nearby bus stops | Distance km | | Location |
| Service routes | | English | Chinese | Connections | Nearby bus stops | Distance km | | Location |
|---|---|---|---|---|---|---|---|---|
| ● | | Chiwan | 赤湾 | 2 8 | | 0.00 | 0.00 | Nanshan |
| ● | | Liwan | 荔湾 | | 42 81 M347 M364 M372 M375 M409 M467 | 2.60 | 2.60 | Nanshan |
| ● | | Railway Park | 铁路公园 | 15 | B991 | 0.70 | 3.20 | Nanshan; Qianhai |
| ● | | Mawan | 妈湾 | | M158 M409 | 0.70 | 3.90 | Nanshan; Qianhai |
| ● | | Qianwan Park | 前湾公园 | | | 1.18 | 5.08 | Nanshan; Qianhai |
| ● | | Qianwan | 前湾 | 9 | B990 | 0.88 | 5.96 | Nanshan; Qianhai |
| ● | | Guiwan | 桂湾 | | B683 B995 M158 | 1.25 | 7.21 | Nanshan; Qianhai |
| ● | ● | Qianhaiwan | 前海湾 | 1 11 | M158 M562 T01A Talent Port Line T01B（T01B人才港专线）Torch Line T01B（T01B火炬专线）T168 T188 | 0.56 | 7.77 | Nanshan; Qianhai |
| ● | ● | Linhai | 临海 | | | 1.37 | 9.14 | Bao'an |
| ● | ● | Baohua | 宝华 | | M235 M379 M558 Charming Bay Area Orange Line（魅力湾区线橙线） | 0.88 | 10.02 | Bao'an |
| ● | ● | Bao'an Center | 宝安中心 | 1 | M157 M350 M371 M375 M376 M377 M379 M470 M473 Charming Bay Area Orange Line（魅力湾区线橙线） | 0.63 | 10.65 | Bao'an |
| ● | ● | Fanshen | 翻身 | | 631 794 797 B623 E15 M375 M376 M377 M483 T2A Peak-time 26（高峰26） | 0.84 | 11.49 | Bao'an |
| ● | ● | Lingzhi | 灵芝 | 12 | 382 395 606 610 615 630 651 797 866 E23 M250 M349 M370 M371 M378 M380 M425 | 1.53 | 13.02 | Bao'an |
| ● | ● | Honglang North | 洪浪北 | 15 | 382 610 613 629 630 651 866 B829 M206 M245 M246 M313 M376 M377 M378 M379 M381 M382 M385 M393 | 0.91 | 13.93 | Bao'an |
| ● | ● | Xingdong | 兴东 | 29 | 382 613 630 631 651 797 866 B889 M206 M376 M377 M378 M379 M382 M385 M393 Peak-time 103（高峰103） | 1.19 | 15.12 | Bao'an |
| ● | ● | Liuxiandong | 留仙洞 | 13 | 37 54 235 382 797 B708 B796 B855 M393 M429 Peak-time 93（高峰93） Peak-time 103（高峰103） | 2.72 | 17.84 | Nanshan |
| ● | ● | Xili | 西丽 | 7 27 | 19 36 54 66 67 74 81 101 104 122 226 233 235 237 316 325 325B 326 332 382 392 392区间 797 B604 B708 B796 B797 E19 M203 M243 M299 M343 M345 M369 M385 M393 M429 M459 M492 N8 Peak-time 75（高峰75） Peak-time 93（高峰93） Peak-time 94（高峰94） Peak-time 104（高峰104） | 1.12 | 18.96 | Nanshan |
| ● | ● | University Town | 大学城 | | 36 43 49 74 81 122 B736 M217 M299 M343 M369 M385 M393 M459 Peak-time 94（高峰94） | 1.14 | 20.10 | Nanshan |
| ● | ● | Tanglang | 塘朗 | | B818 M217 M343 M393 M460 Peak-time 94（高峰94） Peak-time 119（高峰119） Peak-time 120（高峰120） | 3.70 | 23.80 | Nanshan |
| ● | ● | Changlingpi | 长岭陂 | 27 | 43 74 81 M217 M299 M343 M369 M385 M393 M459 M460 Peak-time 94（高峰94） Peak-time 119（高峰119） | 1.56 | 25.36 | Nanshan |
| ● | ● | Shenzhen North | 深圳北站 | 4 6 XS GSH IOQ | B666 B667 B730 B742 E7 E11 E22 M217 M225 M299 M300 M340 M341 M343 M344 M347 M352 M353 M354 M365 M462 M477 U1 Peak-time 76（高峰76） Peak-time 120（高峰120） | 2.55 | 28.91 | Longhua |
| ● | ● | Minzhi | 民治 | 22 | 302 302区间 324 333 334 336 339 352 620 621 B657 B690 B917 E7 M225 M262 M282 M302 M344 M365 M372 M391 M392 M500 Peak-express 9（高快9） Peak-time 7（高峰7） Peak-time 13（高峰13） Peak-time 24（高峰24） Sightseeing 3（观光3） | 1.27 | 30.18 | Longhua |
| ● | ● | Wuhe | 五和 | 10 | 328 612 982 B686 E22 M137 M263 M271 M282A M282B M342 M346 M383 M385 M398 M415 M448 M461A M461B M491 M521 M533 M566 M567 Peak-express 41（高快41） Peak-time 91（高峰91） | 2.34 | 32.52 | Longgang |
| ● | ● | Bantian | 坂田 | | 312 321 333 651 839 982 B668 B742 B923 E7 E8 E22 E27 M221 M233 M300 M301 M363 M374 M379 M385 M415 M447 M448 M481 M505 Peak-time 39（高峰39） | 1.05 | 33.57 | Longgang |
| ● | ● | Yangmei | 杨美 | | 321 651 839 B742 M233 M301 M363 M379 M385 M415 M461 | 0.95 | 34.52 | Longgang |
| ● | ● | Shangshuijing | 上水径 | | 123 303 307 308 312 381 839 980 B695 K105 M233 M267 M268 M269 M271 M272 M378 M379 M414 M415 M421 N19 Peak-time 25（高峰25） Peak-time 79（高峰79） | 2.66 | 37.18 | Longgang |
| ● | ● | Xiashuijing | 下水径 | | 123 303 307 308 312 381 839 980 B695 K105 M233 M267 M268 M269 M271 M272 M378 M379 M414 M415 M421 N19 Peak-time 25（高峰25） Peak-time 79（高峰79） | 1.08 | 38.26 | Longgang |
| ● | ● | Changlong | 长龙 | | 9 61 303 306 307 308 312 369 821B 839 956 980 B695 K545 M233 M265 M267 M268 M269 M271 M272 M378 M379 M402 M414 M415 M421 N19 Peak-time 79（高峰79） | 0.85 | 39.11 | Longgang |
| ● | ● | Buji | 布吉 | 3 14 BJQ GS | 8 85 309 321 322 357 366 371 372 375 376 383 398 839 954 977 980 E24 M203 M224 M233 M244 M265 M268 M271 M273 M283 M295 M310 M311 M358 M378 M379 M404 M406 M408 M415 M485 Peak-time 79（高峰79） Sightseeing 2（观光2） Shen-Hui 3A（深惠3A） Wutong-Hill 2（梧桐山2） | 1.05 | 40.16 | Longgang |
| ● | ● | Baigelong | 百鸽笼 | 17 | 80 82 822 M281 | 1.51 | 40.67 | Longgang |
| ● | ● | Buxin | 布心 | | 29 59 64 83 107 372 379 B696 N2 N3 N6 | 1.90 | 41.57 | Luohu |
| ● | ● | Tai'an | 太安 | 7 | 2 23 308 363 376 B840 M364 M437 Dameisha-holiday 2（大梅沙假日2） | 0.85 | 42.42 | Luohu |
| ● | ● | Yijing | 怡景 | | 13 17 52 57 65 103 104 113 202 214 218 223 229 308 333 B909 H92 M373 M437 N15 U1 Airport 6（机场6） | 2.09 | 44.51 | Luohu |
| ● | ● | Huangbeiling | 黄贝岭 | 2 8 | 10 27 69 85 111 205 220 223 311 336 363 381 382 387 E26 K113 M290 M348 M362 M383 M445 N14 N21 Dameisha-holiday 2（大梅沙假日2） Peak-time 32（高峰32） Peak-time 97（高峰97）Sightseeing 1（观光1） | 1.65 | 46.16 | Luohu |
| | | Hubei | 湖贝 | 2 8 (OSI) | 10 17 29 85 104 220 223 M133 M373 M383 N85 Peak-time 73（高峰73） | 1.14 | 47.30 | Luohu |
| | | Dongmen | 东门 | 1 3 17 (via Laojie) | | 0.34 | 47.64 | Luohu |
| | | Grand Theater | 大剧院 | 1 2 8; 9 11 (via Hongling South) | 3 10 14 12 29 85 101 104 113 203 204 223 M103 M106 M112 M133 M152 M159 M192 M482 | 1.46 | 49.10 | Luohu |

== Rolling Stock ==
| Type | Date of manufacture | Series | Sets | Serial number | Assembly | Notes |
|---|---|---|---|---|---|---|
| Type A | 2009 - 2012 | A-size stock | 30 | 501-530 | Tc+Mp+M+M+Mp+Tc | Manufactured by Zhuzhou Electric Locomotive Co., Ltd., Siemens traction system (501-522) and CSR Times traction system (523-530) |
| Type A | 2015 - 2016 | A-size stock | 21 | 531-551 | Tc+Mp+M+M+Mp+Tc | Manufactured by Changchun Railway Vehicles, Bombardier Transportation traction system |
| Type A | 2018 - 2019 | A-size stock | 6 | 552-557 | Tc+Mp+M+M+Mp+Tc | Manufactured by Zhuzhou Electric Locomotive Co., Ltd., CRRC Times traction system |
| Type A | 2025 - 2026 | A-size stock | 39 | 559-597 | Tc+Mp+M+M+Mp+Tc | Manufactured by Changchun Railway Vehicles, CRRC Times traction system |

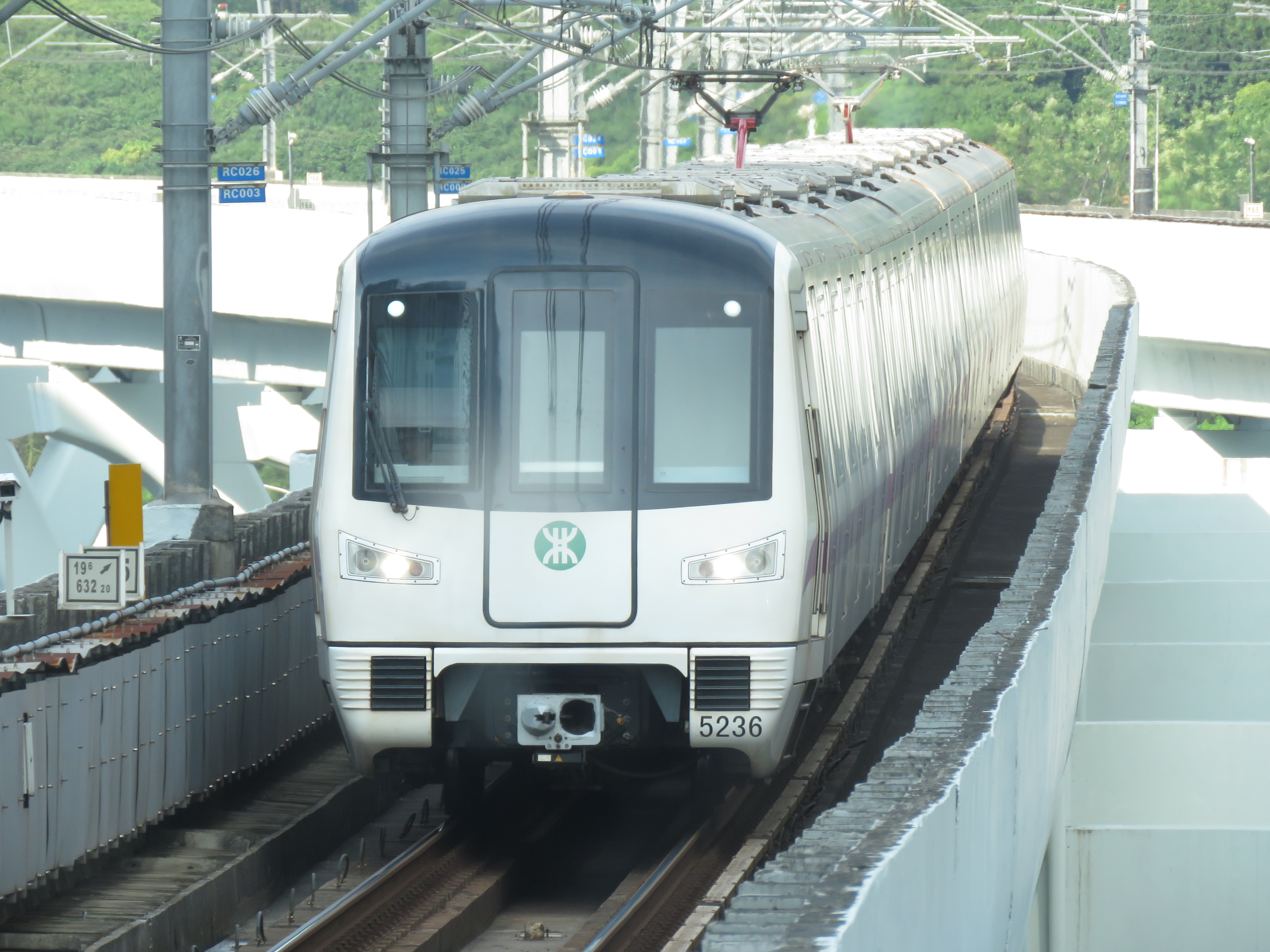
Zhuzhou Electric Locomotive Co., Ltd. train

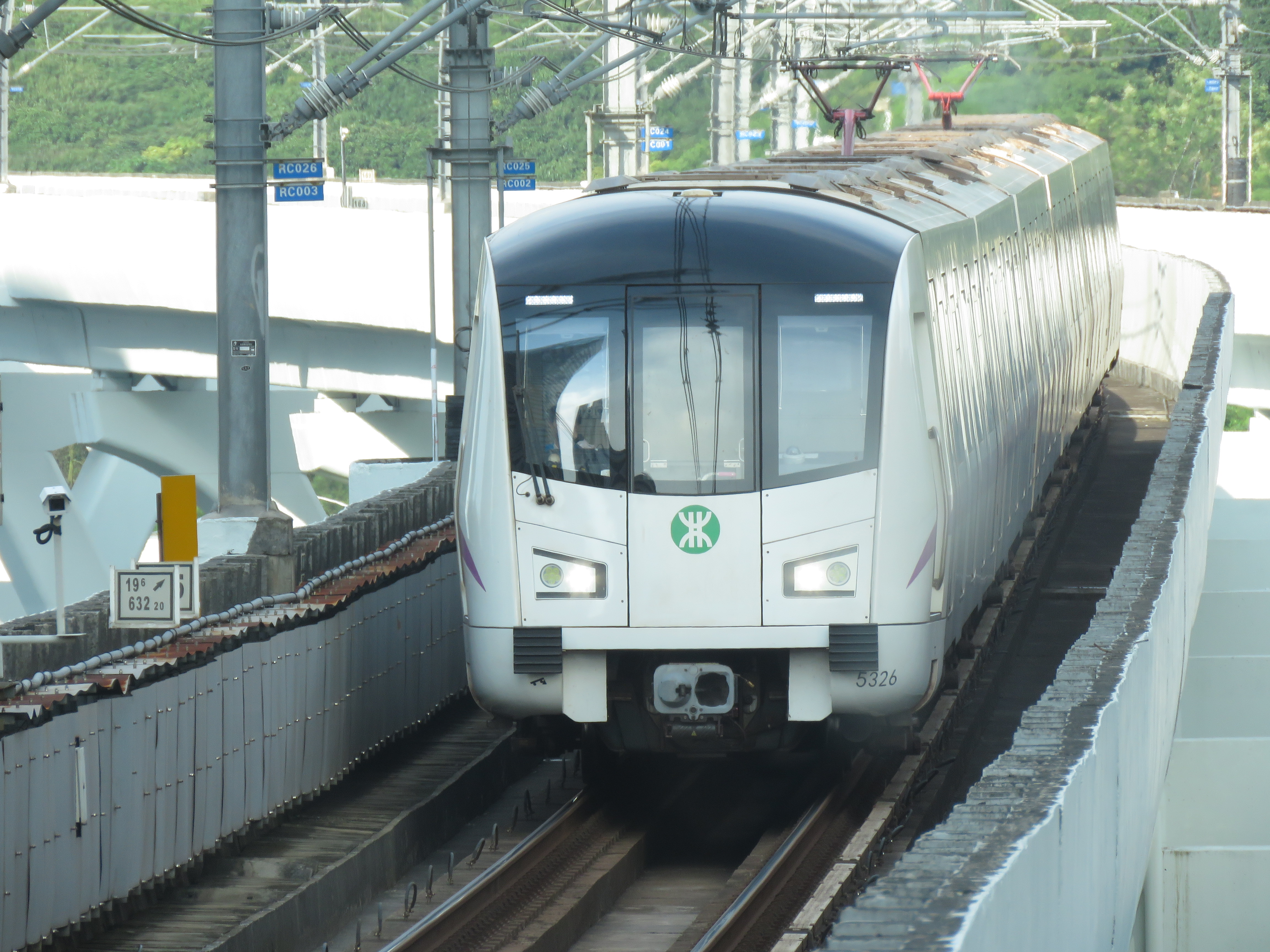
Changchun Railway Vehicles train

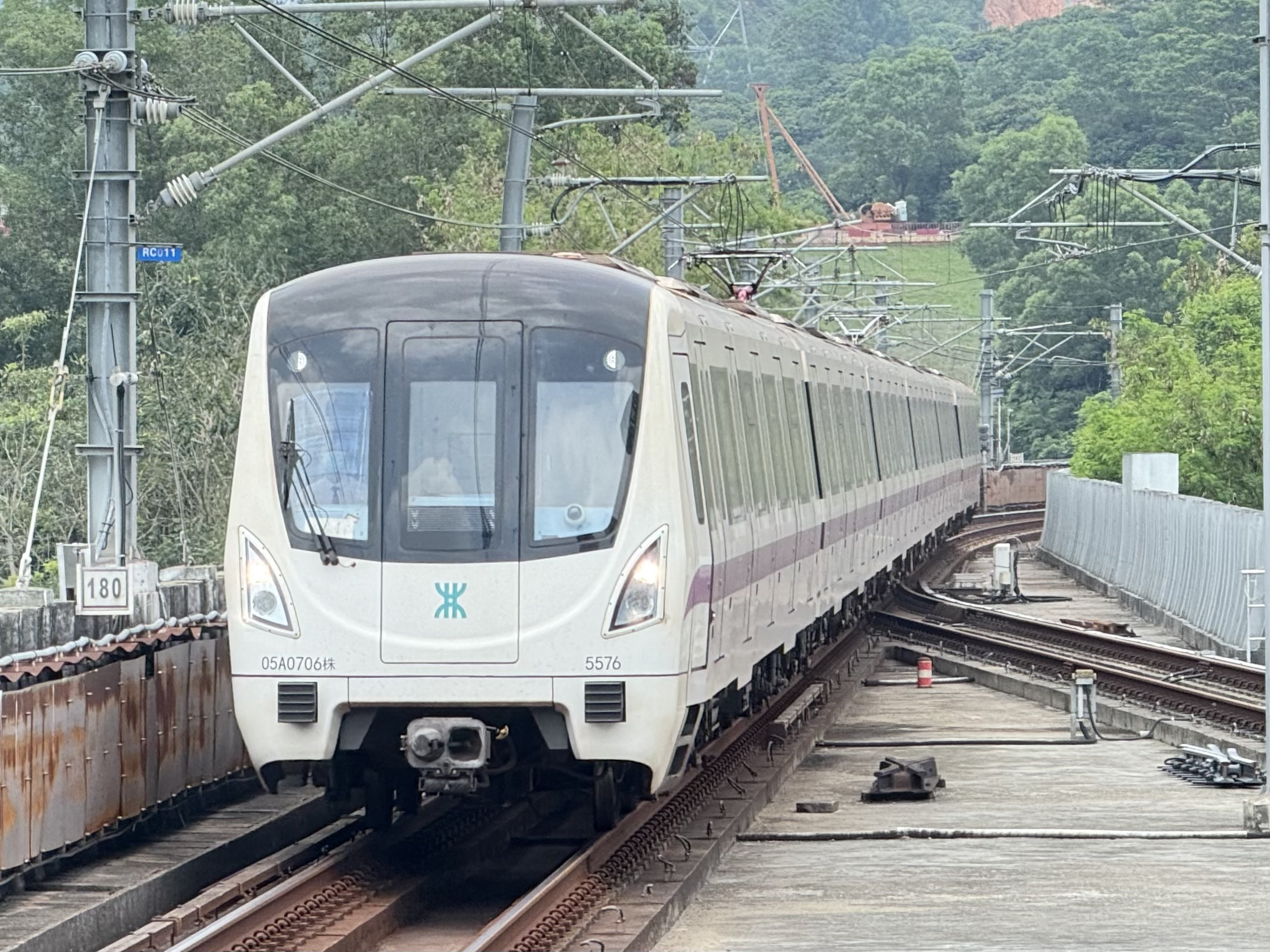
Zhuzhou Electric Locomotive Co., Ltd. train

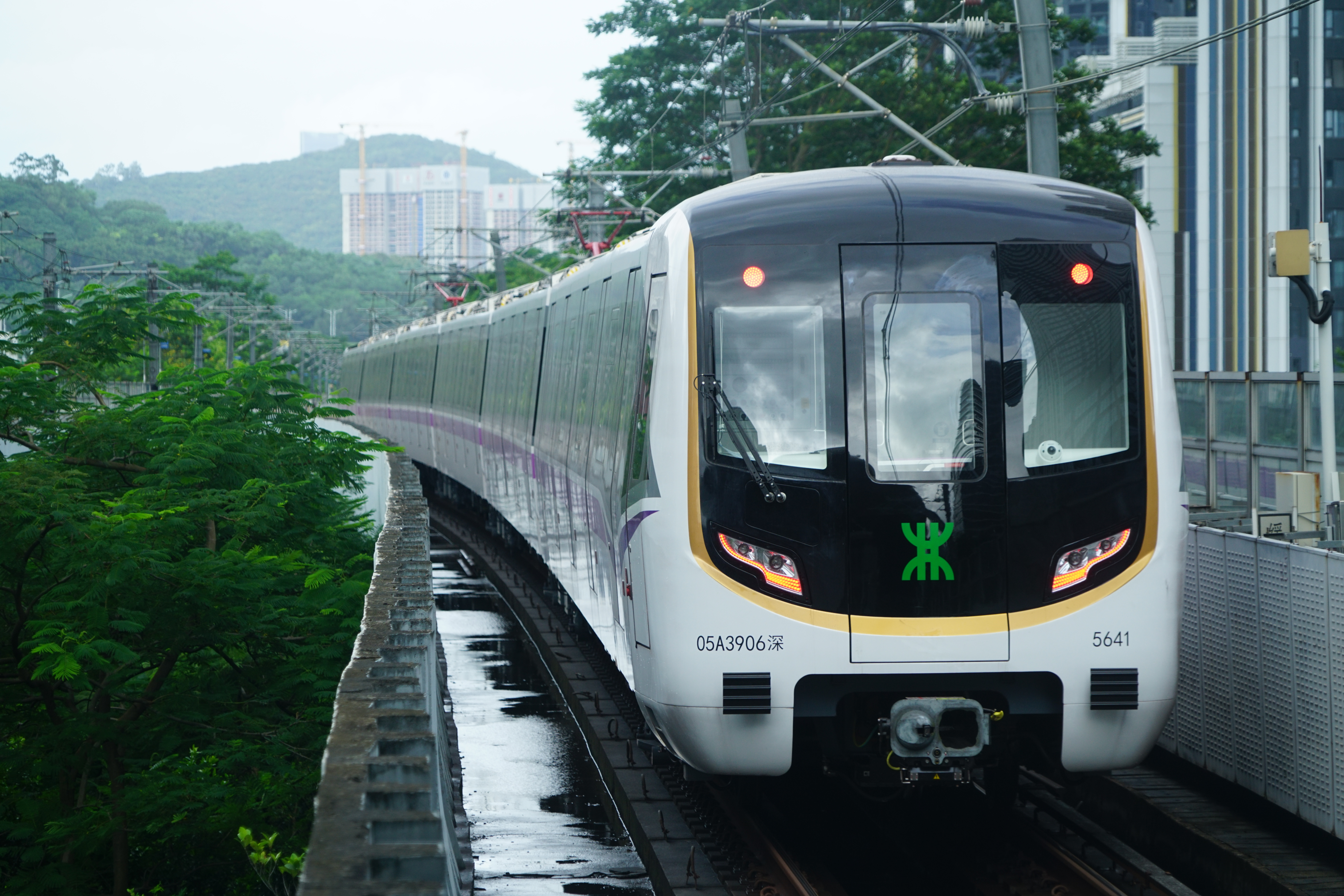
CRRC Changchun Railway Vehicles train
