= Bantian station =

Metro station in Shenzhen, Guangdong, China

Coordinates: 22°37′39″N 114°4′15″E

Bantian 坂田
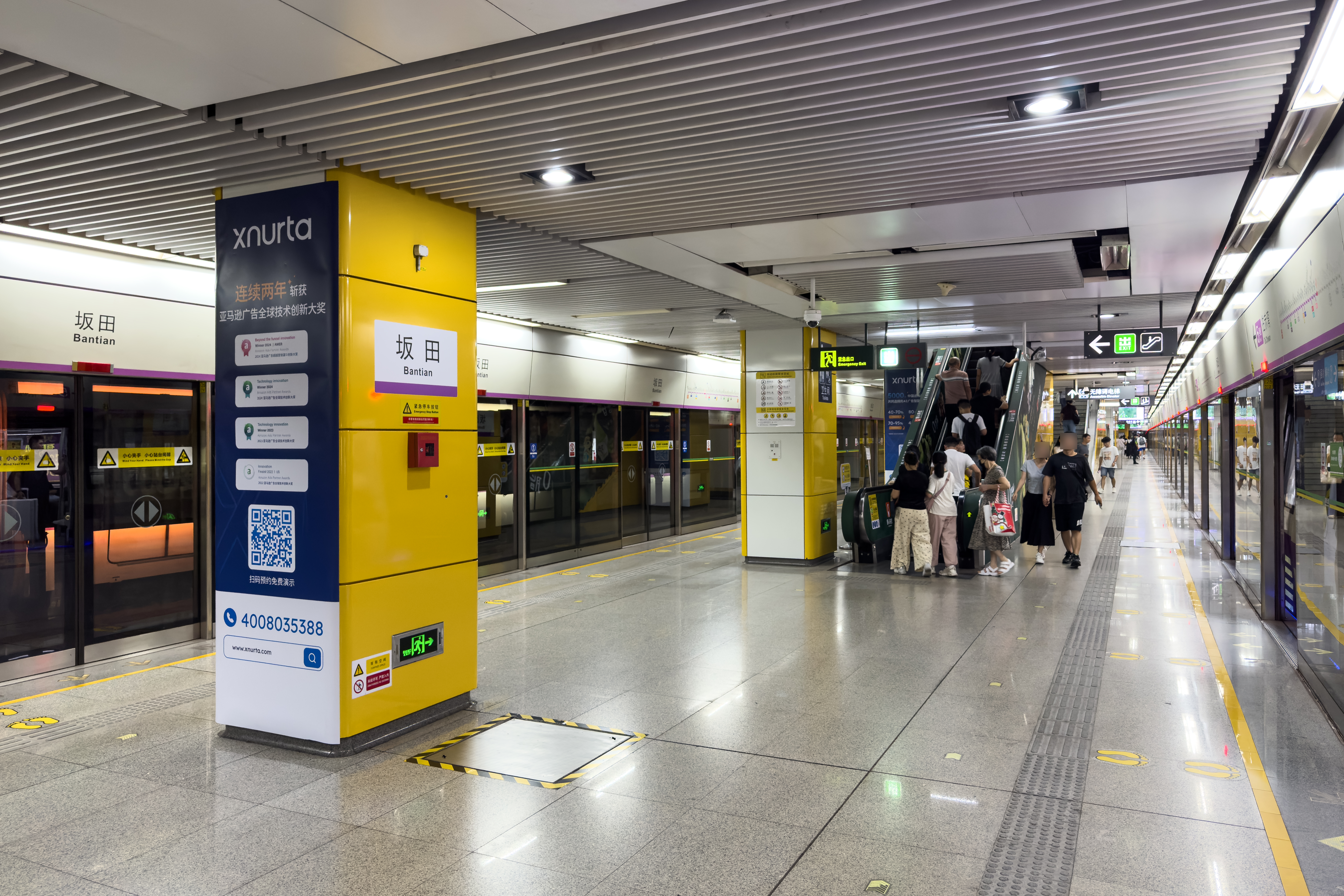
- Bantian Station

General information
- Location: Longgang District, Shenzhen, Guangdong; China
- Operator: SZMC (Shenzhen Metro Group)
- Line: Line 5

History
- Opened: 22 June 2011

Services
Preceding station	Shenzhen Metro	Following station
Yangmei towards Grand Theater	Line 5	Wuhe towards Chiwan
Location

Bantian station (Chinese: 坂田站; pinyin: Bǎntián Zhàn; Jyutping: baan^{2} tin^{4} zaam^{6}) is a station on Line 5 of the Shenzhen Metro. It opened on 22 June 2011. It is located at the junction of Bulong Road and Banxuegang Avenue.
