= Honglang North station =

Metro station in Shenzhen, China

Coordinates: 22°34′29″N 113°54′38″E

Honglang North 洪浪北
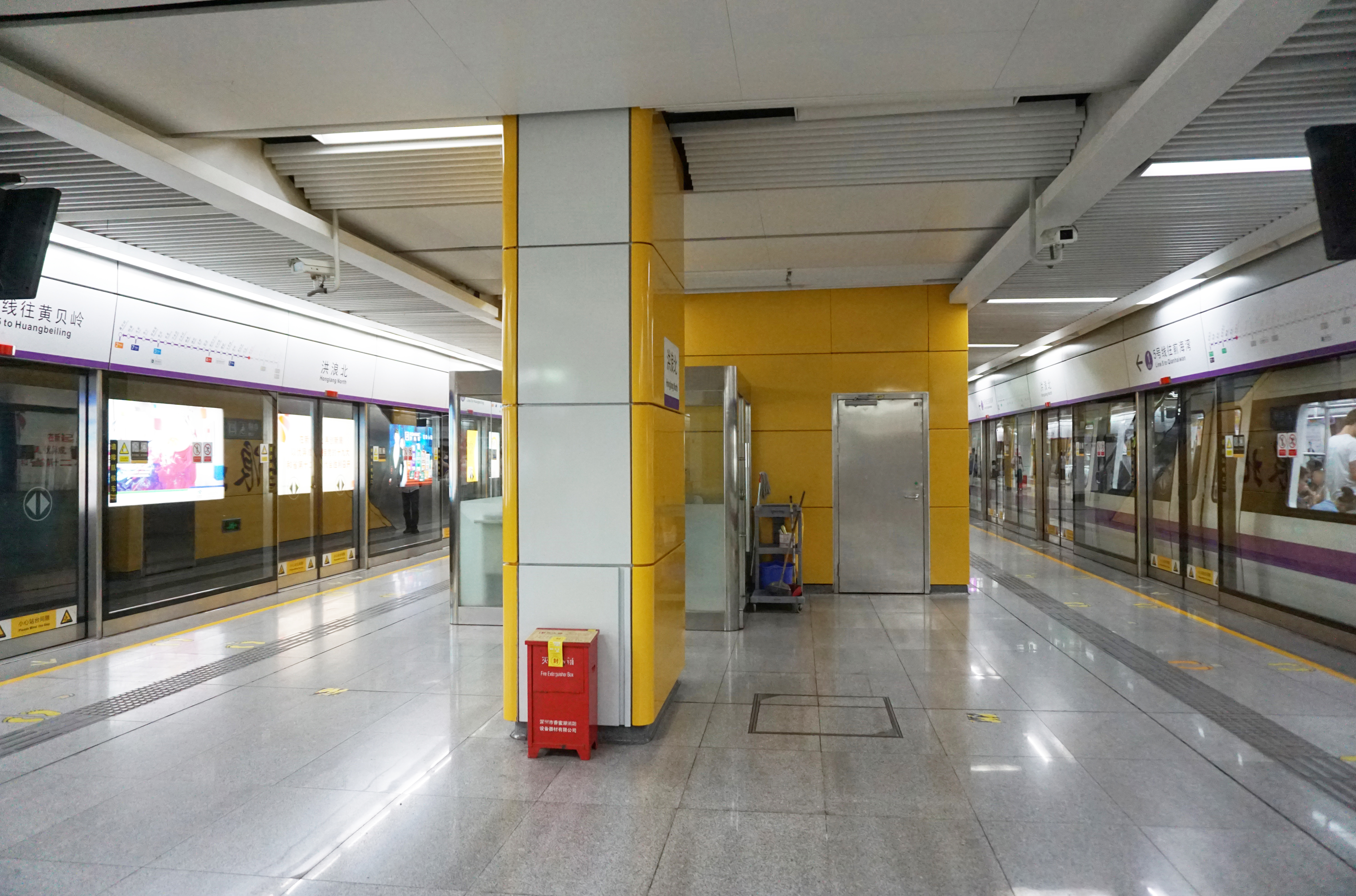

General information
- Location: Bao'an District, Shenzhen, Guangdong; China
- Operator: SZMC (Shenzhen Metro Group)
- Line: Line 5

History
- Opened: 22 June 2011

Services
Preceding station	Shenzhen Metro	Following station
Xingdong towards Grand Theater	Line 5	Lingzhi towards Chiwan
Location

Honglang North station (Chinese: 洪浪北站; pinyin: Hónglàng Běi Zhàn; Jyutping: hung^{4} long^{6} bak^{1} zaam^{6}) is a metro station on Line 5 of the Shenzhen Metro. It opened on 22 June 2011. This station is underground.

== Station layout ==
G	-	Exit
B1F; Concourse	Lobby	Customer Service, Shops, Vending machines, ATMs
B2F; Platforms	Platform 1	← 5 towards Chiwan (Lingzhi)
B2F; Platforms	Island platform, doors will open on the left
B2F; Platforms	Platform 2	→ 5 towards Grand Theater (Xingdong) →

== Exits ==
Exit	Destination
Exit A	Chuangye 2nd Road (S), Haizhen Road, Xin'an 2nd Road, Honglang Road North, Bao'an District Human Resources Bureau
Exit B	Chuangye 2nd Road (S), Dabao Road, Haizhen Road, Xin'an Local Taxation Office, Local Taxation Bureau of Ban'an District of Shenzhen, Shenzhen Bao’an Entry-Exit Inspection & Quarantine Bureau of the People's Republic of China, Customs House, Dalang Community Health Service Center, Fenghuayuan, Baoya Garden, Donglian Industrial Area, First Industrial Town of China Bao'an Group
Exit C	Xin'an 3rd Road (N), Shanghe Neighborhood Committee, Dalang Neighborhood Committee, Xingfeng Primary School
Exit D	Chuangye 2nd Road (N), Guanhua Yucai School, Toppan Printing Co., (Shenzhen) Ltd.
