= Yijing station =

Metro station in Shenzhen, China

Coordinates: 22°33′23″N 114°8′24″E

Yijing 怡景
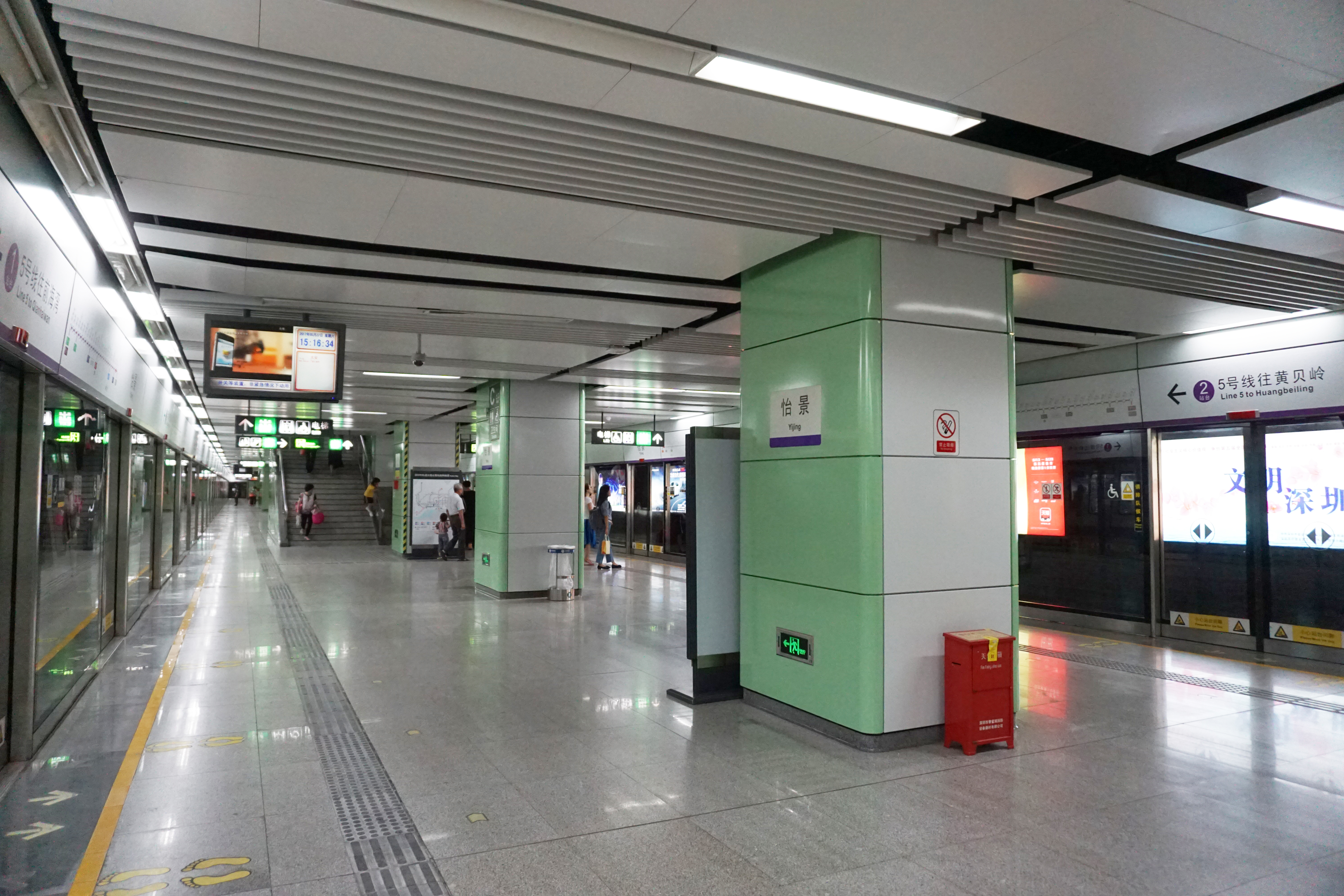

General information
- Location: Yijing Road & Huangbei Road, Huangbei Subdistrict, Luohu District, Shenzhen, Guangdong; China
- Operator: SZMC (Shenzhen Metro Group)
- Line: Line 5

History
- Opened: 22 June 2011

Services
Preceding station	Shenzhen Metro	Following station
Huangbeiling towards Grand Theater	Line 5	Tai'an towards Chiwan
Location

Yijing station (Chinese: 怡景站; pinyin: Yíjǐng Zhàn; Jyutping: ji^{4} ging^{2} zaam^{6}) is a station on Line 5 of the Shenzhen Metro. It opened on 22 June 2011. It is located under the intersection of Yijing Road and Huangbei Road.

== Station layout ==
G	-	Exit
B1F; Concourse	Lobby	Customer Service, Shops, Vending machines, ATMs
B2F; Platforms	Platform 1	← 5 towards Chiwan (Tai'an)
B2F; Platforms	Island platform, doors will open on the left
B2F; Platforms	Platform 2	→ 5 towards Grand Theater (Huangbeiling) →

== Exits ==
Exit	Destination
Exit A	Huangbei Road (W), Yijing Garden, Hehua Market
Exit B	Yijing Road (S), Jingbeinan Residential Area, Jingbei Primary School, Fengjingtai Building
Exit C	Yijing Road (N), Yanhe Road, Luohu District Youth Activity Center, Luohu District Library, Bibo Primary School, Junior Middle Department of Cuiyuan Middle School, Jingbeibei Residential Area, Bibo Garden, Luohu District Finance Bureau, Marriage Registry of Luohu District Civil Affairs Bureau, Enforcement Bureau of Luohu District People's Court, Luohu District People's Procuratorate, Luohu District Consumer Council, Luohu Branch of Market Supervision Administration of Shenzhen Municipality, Luohu District Health Inspection Institute, Exit & Entry Administration Service Center Luohu Precinct, Shenzhen PSB, Luohu District Human Resources Bureau, Rehabilitation Branch of Luohu District TCM Hospital
Exit D	Yijing Road (N), Aiguo Road, Shenzhen National Cartoon and Animation Industry Base, Shenzhen Symphony Concert Hall, Hubin Xincun, Luohu School for Hong Kong Children
