= Xiashuijing station =

Metro station in Shenzhen, Guangdong, China

Coordinates: 22°36′51″N 114°6′39″E

Xiashuijing 下水径
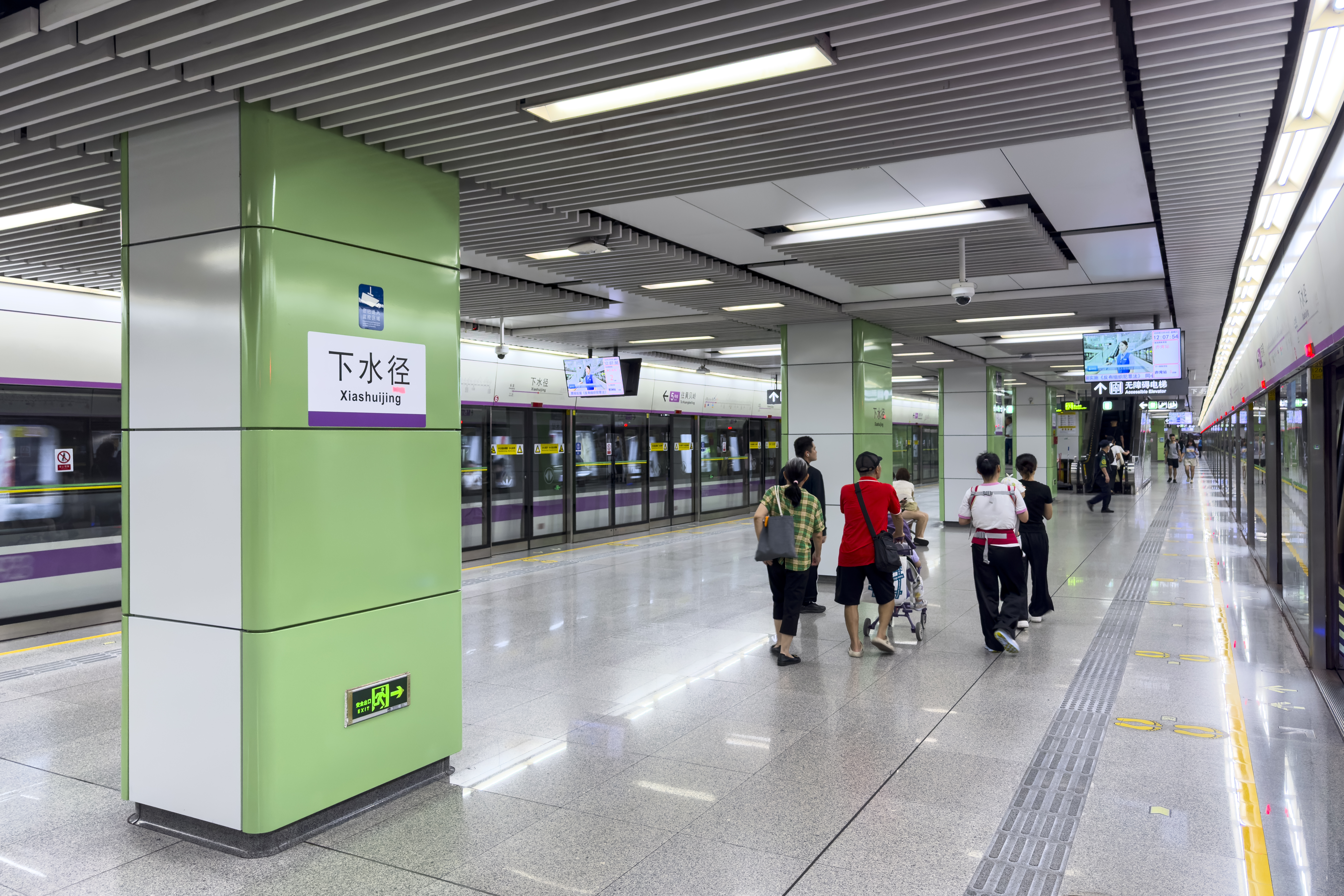

Chinese name
- Simplified Chinese: 下水径
- Traditional Chinese: 下水徑
- Literal meaning: Lower Water Path
Transcriptions
Yue: Cantonese
- Jyutping: haa^{6} seoi^{2}ging^{3}

General information
- Location: Longgang District, Shenzhen, Guangdong; China
- Operator: SZMC (Shenzhen Metro Group)
- Line: Line 5

History
- Opened: 22 June 2011

Services
Preceding station	Shenzhen Metro	Following station
Changlong towards Grand Theater	Line 5	Shangshuijing towards Chiwan
Location

Xiashuijing station (Chinese: 下水径站; pinyin: Xiàshuǐjìng Zhàn; Jyutping: haa^{6} seoi^{2} ging^{3} zaam^{6}) is a metro station on Line 5 of the Shenzhen Metro. It opened on 22 June 2011. This station is located under Jihua Road.

== Station layout ==
G	-	Exit
B1F; Concourse	Lobby	Customer Service, Shops, Vending machines, ATMs
B2F; Platforms	Platform 1	← 5 towards Chiwan (Shangshuijing)
B2F; Platforms	Island platform, doors will open on the left
B2F; Platforms	Platform 2	→ 5 towards Grand Theater (Changlong) →

== Exits ==
Exit	Destination
Exit A	Jihua Road (W), Buji Passenger & Freight Transport Station, Daliang Station
Exit B	Reserved Exit
Exit C	Jihua Road (E), Xiashuijing Building, Zhongnan Mingzhu Building, Shenzhen Donghua Outpatient Department, Qiyuan School, Xiashuijing Village Committee Building, Shuijing Police Station, Changlongyuan, Yangguang Building, Hubei Baofang Industrial Area
Exit D	Reserved Exit
