= Huangbeiling station =

Metro station in Shenzhen, Guangdong, China

Coordinates: 22°32′44″N 114°8′5″E

Huangbeiling 黄贝岭
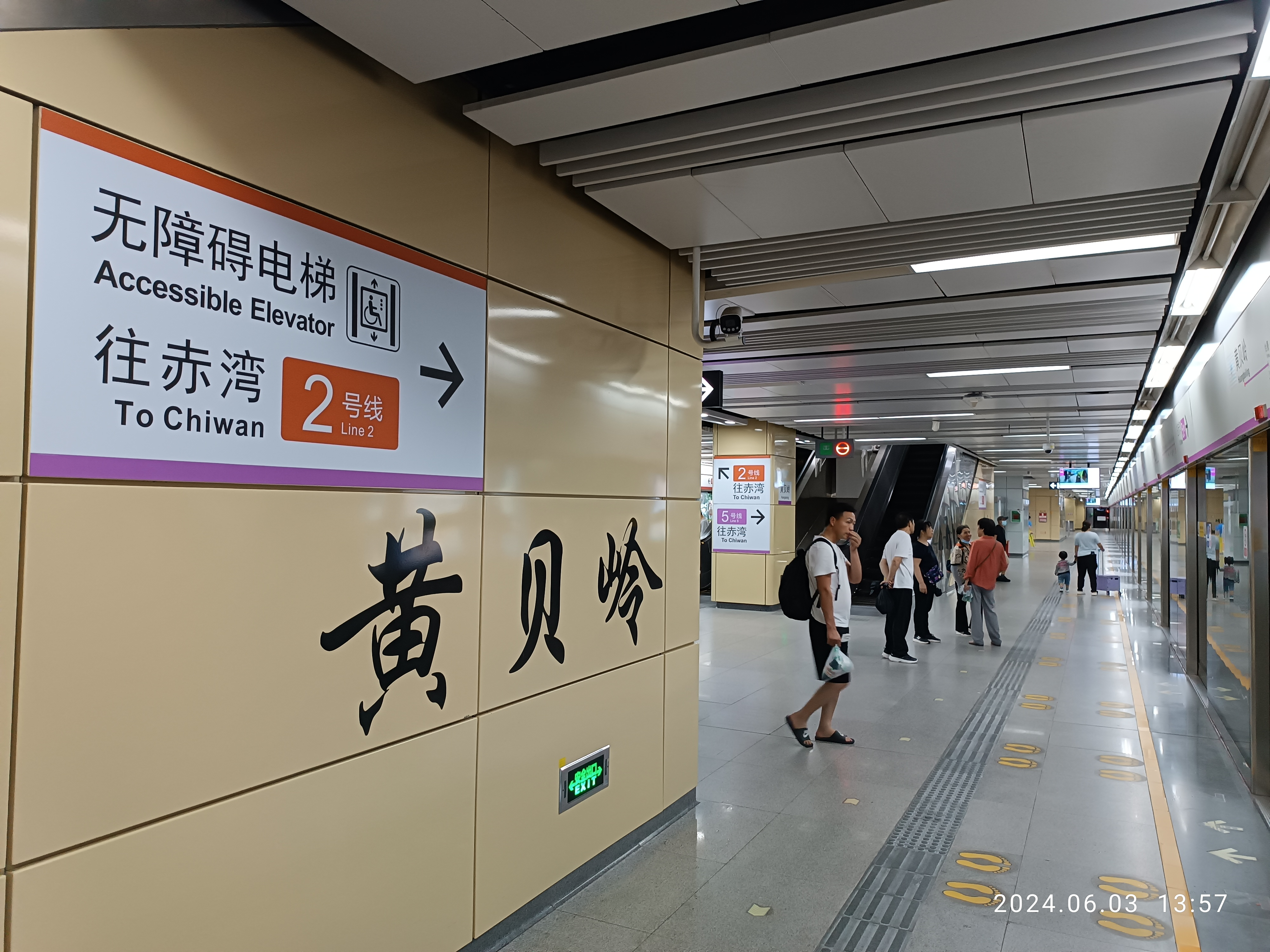
- Platforms

Chinese name
- Traditional Chinese: 黃貝嶺
- Simplified Chinese: 黄贝岭
- Literal meaning: Yellow Shell Ridge
Transcriptions
Standard Mandarin
- Hanyu Pinyin: Huángbèi Lǐng
Yue: Cantonese
- Jyutping: Wong4 Bui3 Leng5/Ling5

General information
- Location: Shennan East Road, Huangbei Subdistrict, Luohu District, Shenzhen, Guangdong; China
- Operated by: SZMC (Shenzhen Metro Group)
- Lines: Line 2; Line 5
- Platforms: 4 (2 island platforms)
- Tracks: 4

Construction
- Structure type: Underground
- Accessible: Yes

Other information
- Station code: 228

History
- Opened: Line 5: 22 June 2011 (14 years ago); Line 2: 28 June 2011 (14 years ago)

Services
Preceding station	Shenzhen Metro	Following station
Hubei towards Chiwan	Line 2	Xinxiu towards Liantang (Line 8: Xichong)
Hubei towards Grand Theater	Line 5	Yijing towards Chiwan
Route map
Location

Huangbeiling station (simplified Chinese: 黄贝岭站; traditional Chinese: 黃貝嶺站; pinyin: Huángbèilǐng Zhàn; Jyutping: Wong4 Bui3 Leng5/Ling5 Zaam6) is an interchange station on Line 2 and Line 5 of the Shenzhen Metro. Line 2 platforms opened on 28 June 2011 and Line 5 platforms opened on 22 June 2011. This station is located underneath Shennan East Road.

== Station layout ==
G	–	Exit
B1F; Concourse	Lobby	Customer Service, Shops, Vending machines, ATMs
B2F; Platforms		2 towards Chiwan (Hubei)
B2F; Platforms	Island platform, doors will open on the left (Line 2) / right (Line 5)
B2F; Platforms		5 towards Grand Theater (Hubei)
B2F; Platforms		5 towards Chiwan (Yijing)
B2F; Platforms	Island platform, doors will open on the right (Line 5) / left (Line 2)
B2F; Platforms		8 towards Xichong (Xinxiu)

== Exits ==
Exit	Picture	Destination
A		North Side of Shennan East Road, Fenghuang Road, Huangbeiling Park, Huangbeiling Archway, Huangbeiling Village
B		North Side of Shennan East Road, Shenzhen Luohu District People's Government, Shenzhen Luohu District Government Service Center, Shenzhen Luohu District Bureau of Letters and Visits
C		South Side of Shennan East Road, Wenhua Community Health Service Center, Shenzhen Xingzhi Vocational Technical School
D		South Side of Shennan East Road, Eastern Scenic Spot Holiday Special Line, Haifu Garden, Wenhua Garden, Royal Suites & Towers
E		North of Shennan East Road, Honorlux Tower
F 1		North of Shennan East Road, Qingping Road, Yejin Building
F 2		North of Shennan East Road, Qingping Road, Fude Garden
G 1		South of Shennan East Road, West of Beidou Road, Zhizheng Building
G 2		South of Shennan East Road, East of Beidou Road, Xintiandi Mingju
H		South of Shennan East Road, Wenhua Building

== Gallery ==
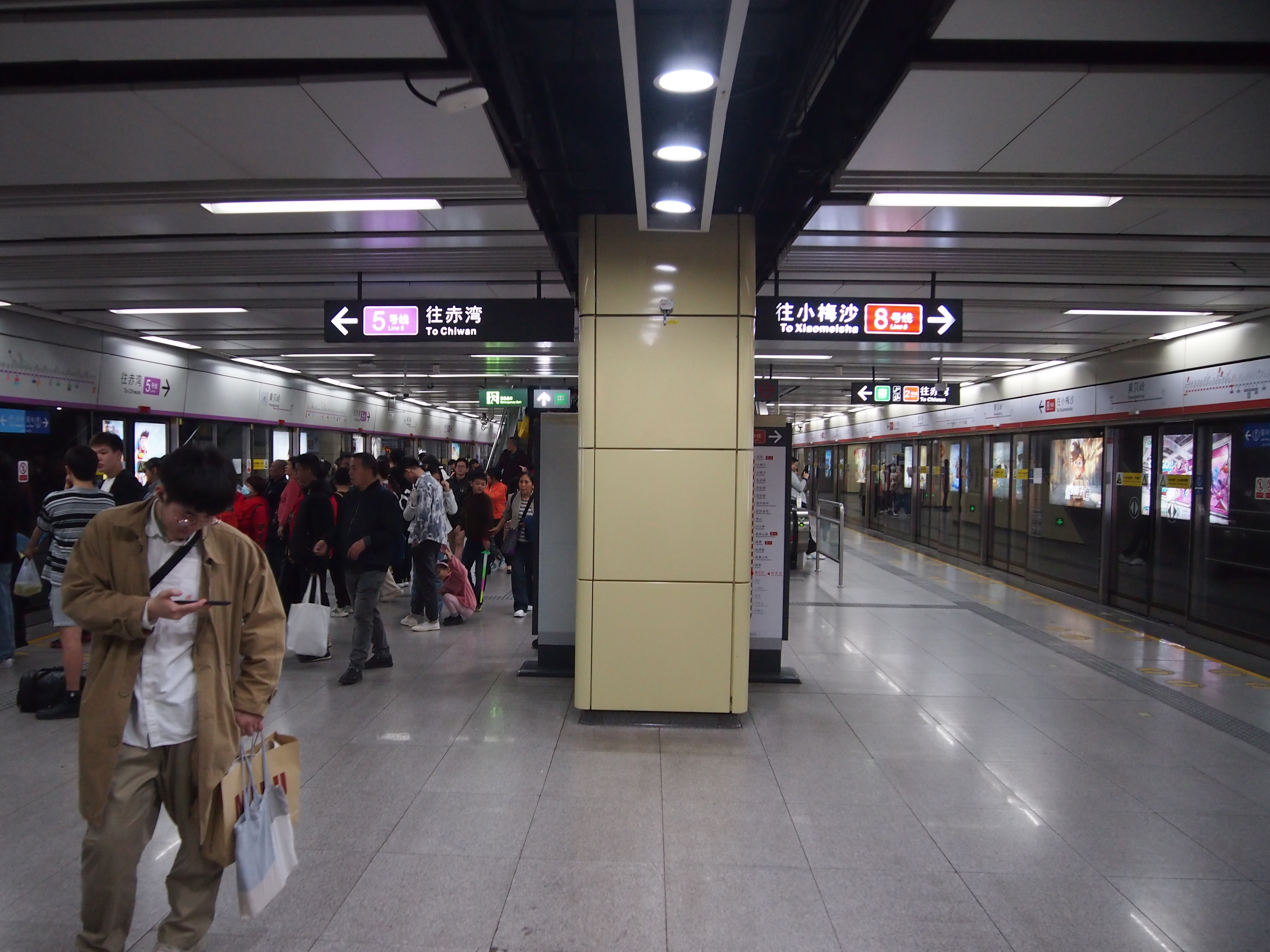
Eastbound Platforms (2024)

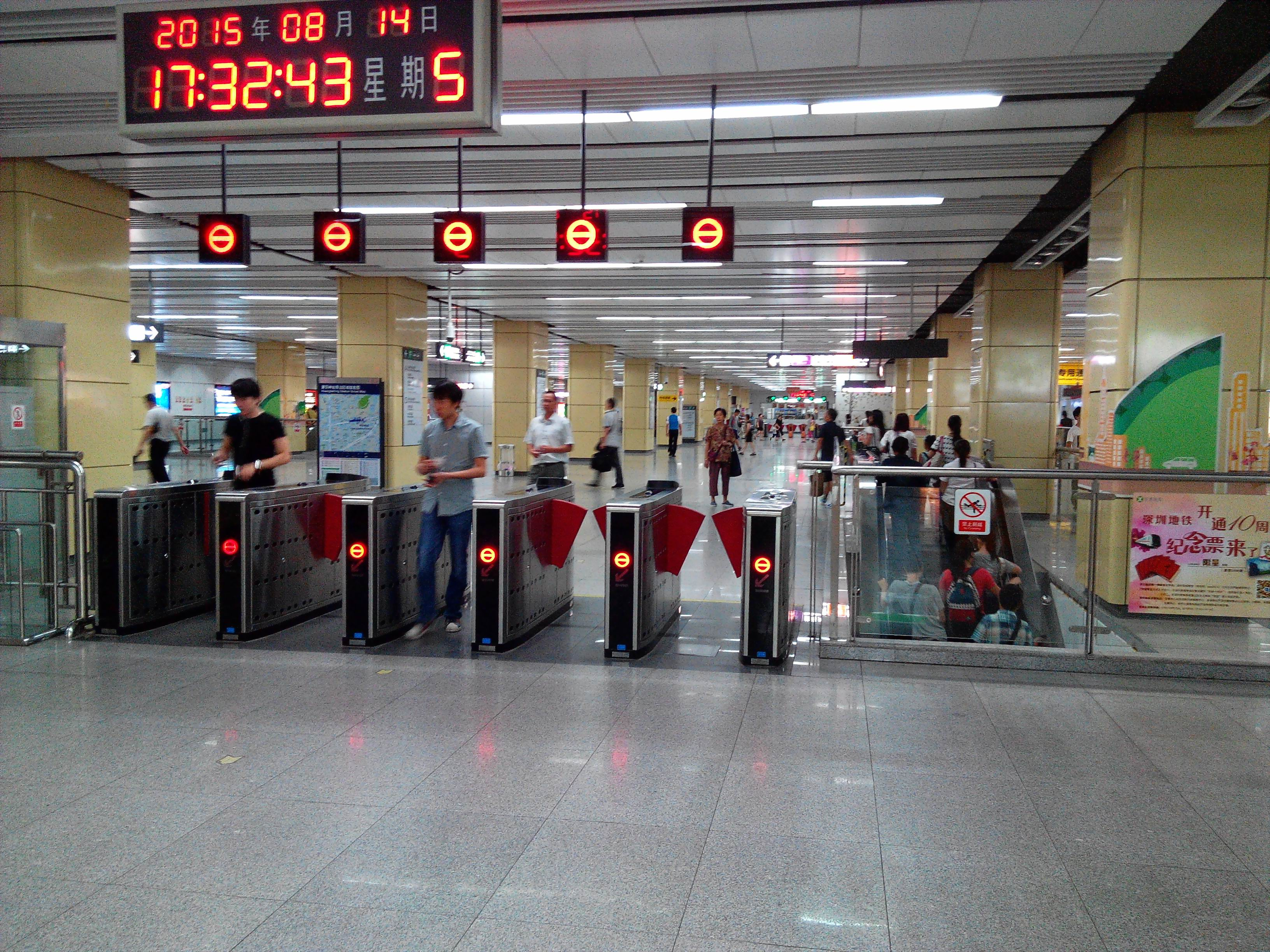
Concourse (2015)

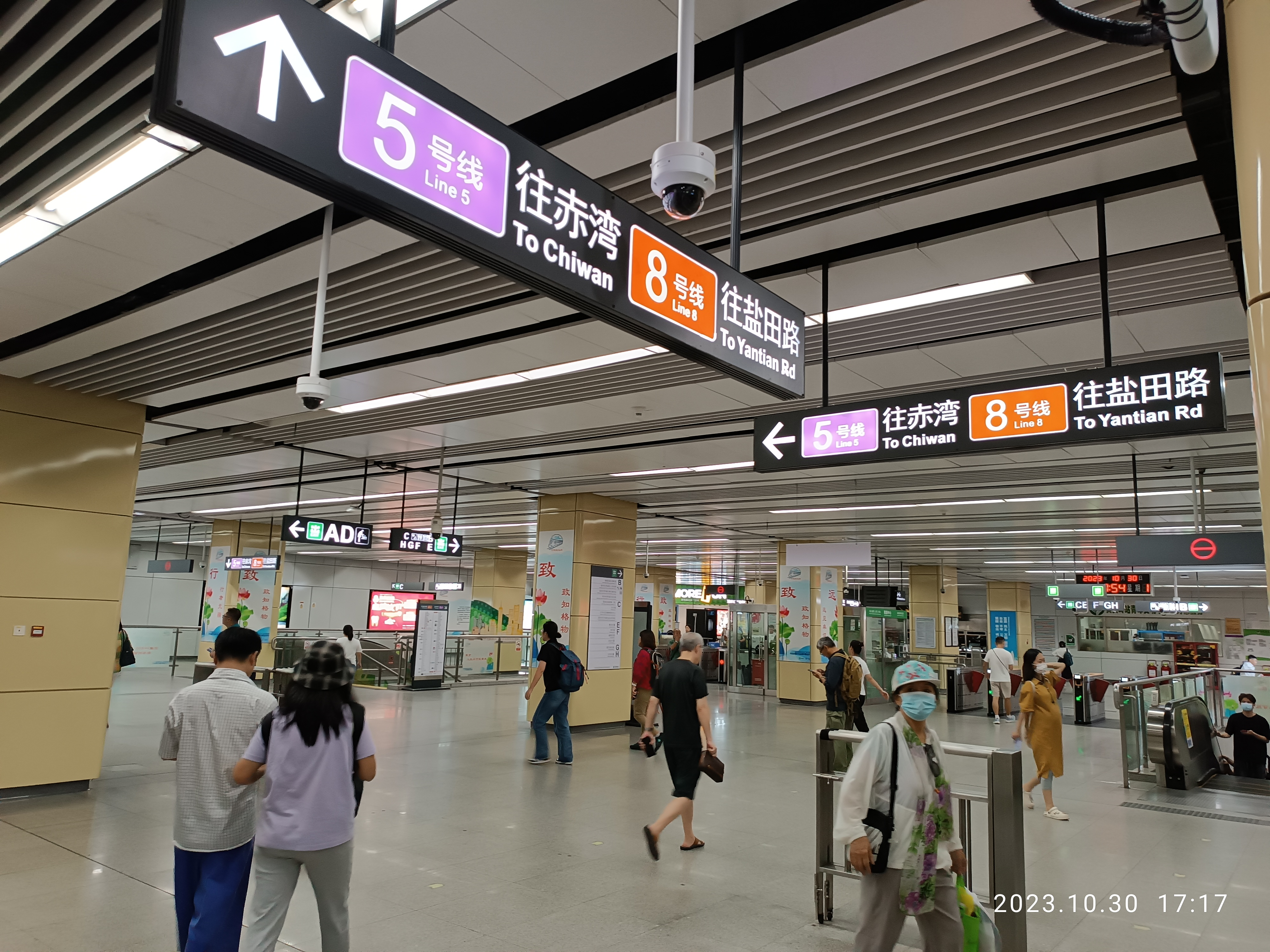
Concourse (2023)

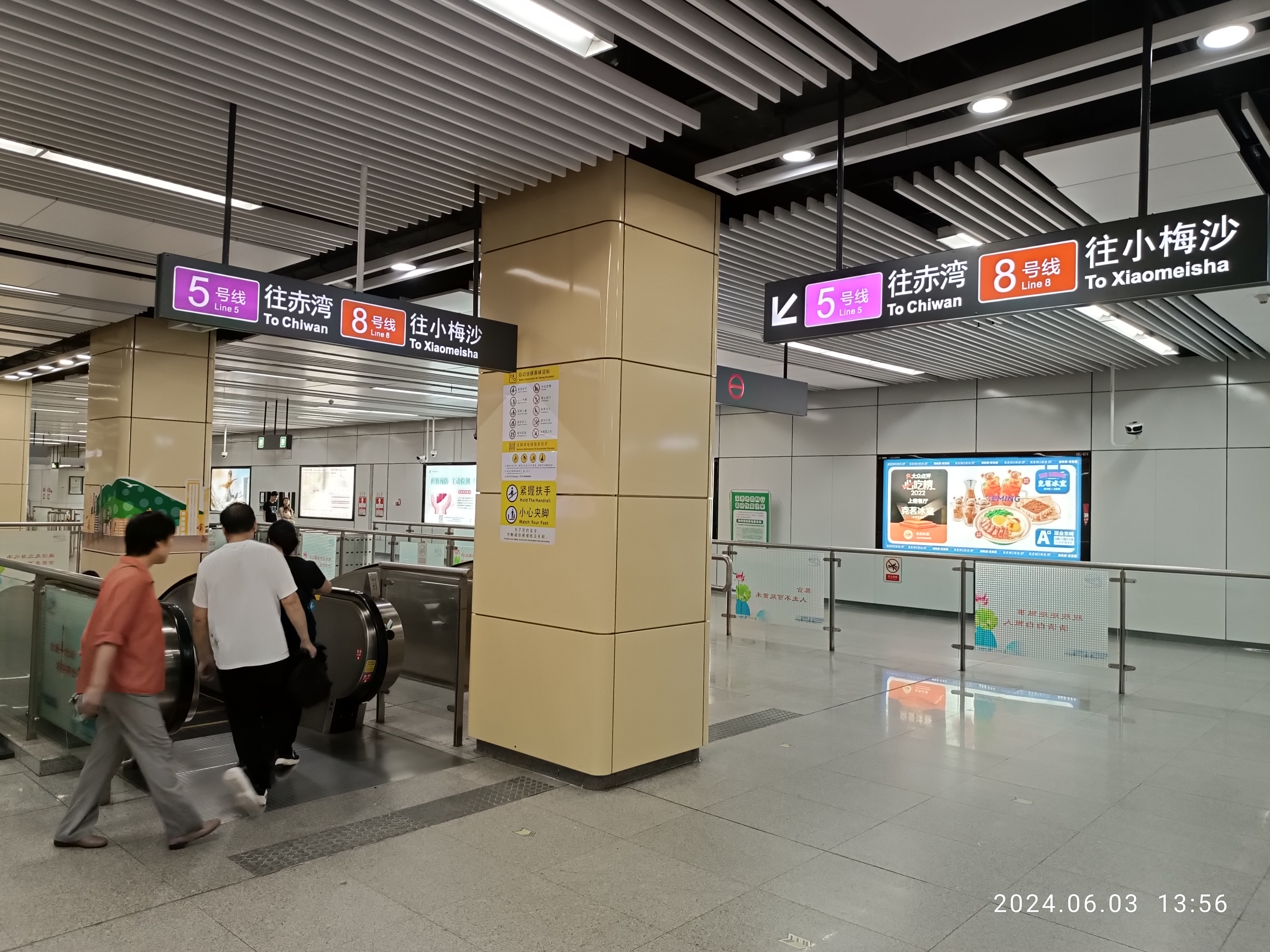
Concourse (2024)

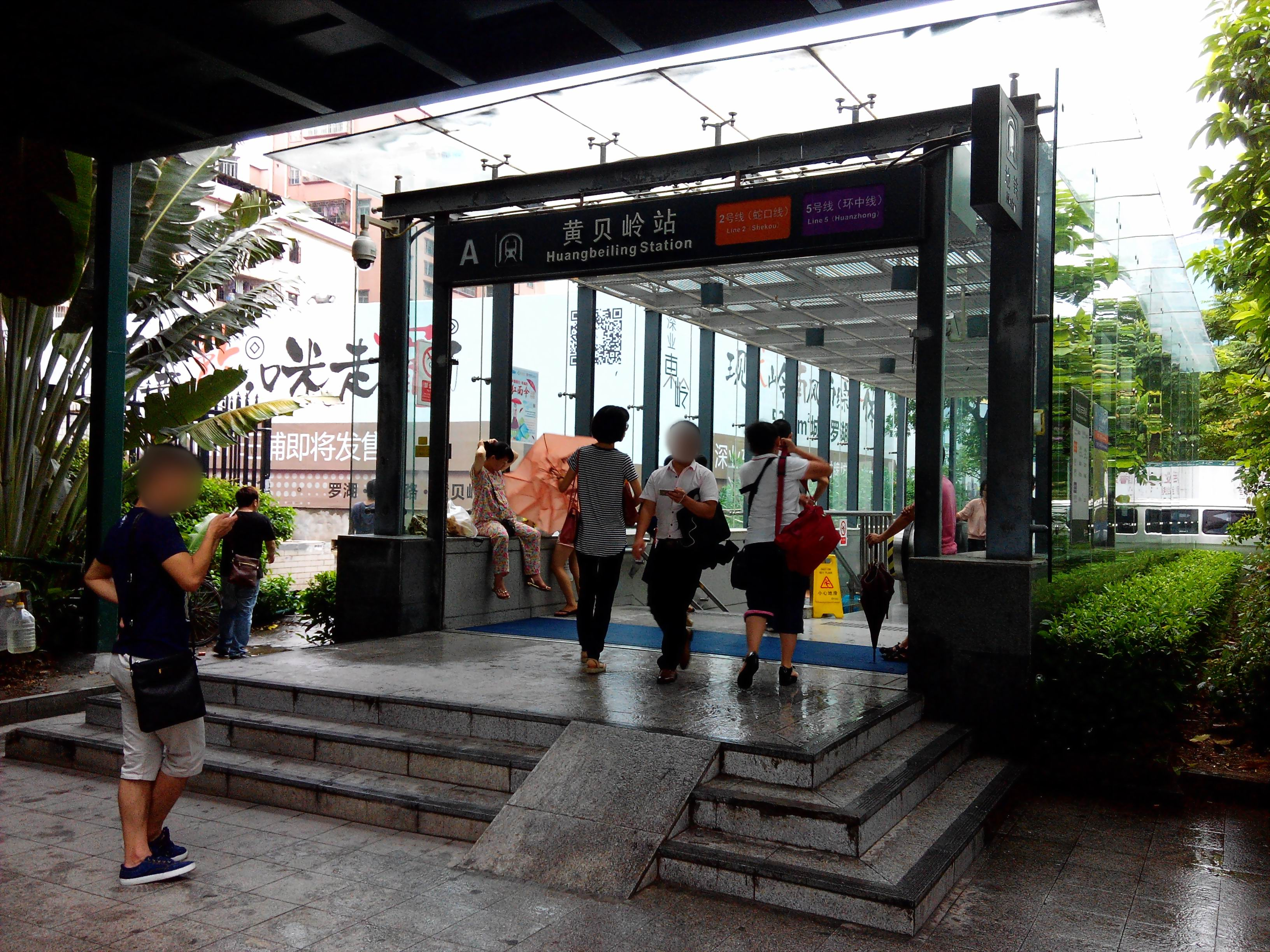
Old Exit A (2015)
