= Shangshuijing station =

Metro station in Shenzhen, Guangdong, China

Coordinates: 22°37′21″N 114°6′6″E

Shangshuijing 上水径
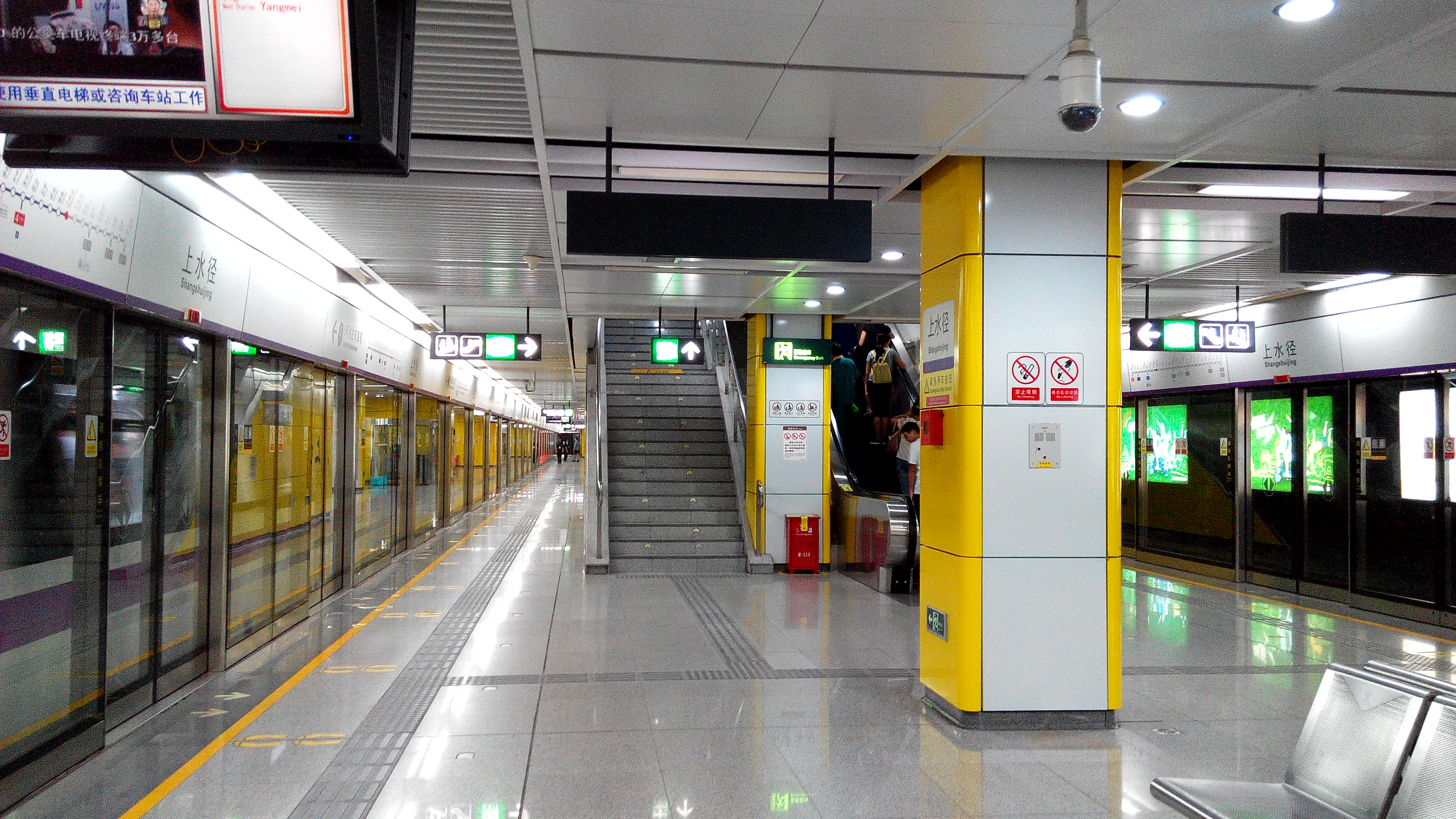
- Platforms (2016)

Chinese name
- Simplified Chinese: 上水径
- Traditional Chinese: 上水徑
- Literal meaning: Upper Water Path
Transcriptions
Yue: Cantonese
- Jyutping: soeng^{6} seoi^{2} ging^{3}

General information
- Location: Longgang District, Shenzhen, Guangdong; China
- Operator: SZMC (Shenzhen Metro Group)
- Line: Line 5

History
- Opened: 22 June 2011

Services
Preceding station	Shenzhen Metro	Following station
Xiashuijing towards Grand Theater	Line 5	Yangmei towards Chiwan
Location

Shangshuijing station (Chinese: 上水径; pinyin: Shàngshuǐjìng Zhàn; Jyutping: soeng^{6} seoi^{2} ging^{3} zaam^{6}) is a station on Line 5 of the Shenzhen Metro. It opened on 22 June 2011. It is located at a hillside west to Jihua Road, Buji Subdistrict, Longgang District, Shenzhen, China.

== Station layout ==
G	-	Exit
B1F; Concourse	Lobby	Customer Service, Shops, Vending machines, ATMs
B2F; Platforms	Platform 1	← 5 towards Chiwan (Yangmei)
B2F; Platforms	Island platform, doors will open on the left
B2F; Platforms	Platform 2	→ 5 towards Grand Theater (Xiashuijing) →

== Exits ==
Exit	Destination
Exit A	Reserved Exit
Exit B	Reserved Exit
Exit C	Jihua Road, Longgang Bus Co. Ltd., Shenzhen Bus Group, Shidai School, Ai'ai School, Deqinchuang Industry, Shuijing School, Shenzhen Shangshuijing Co. Ltd., Lihu Garden, Zhonghai Yicui
Exit D	Lianluo Road (W)
Exit E	Reserved Exit
