= Xingdong station =

Shenzhen Metro station

Coordinates: 22°34′55″N 113°55′8″E

Xingdong 兴东
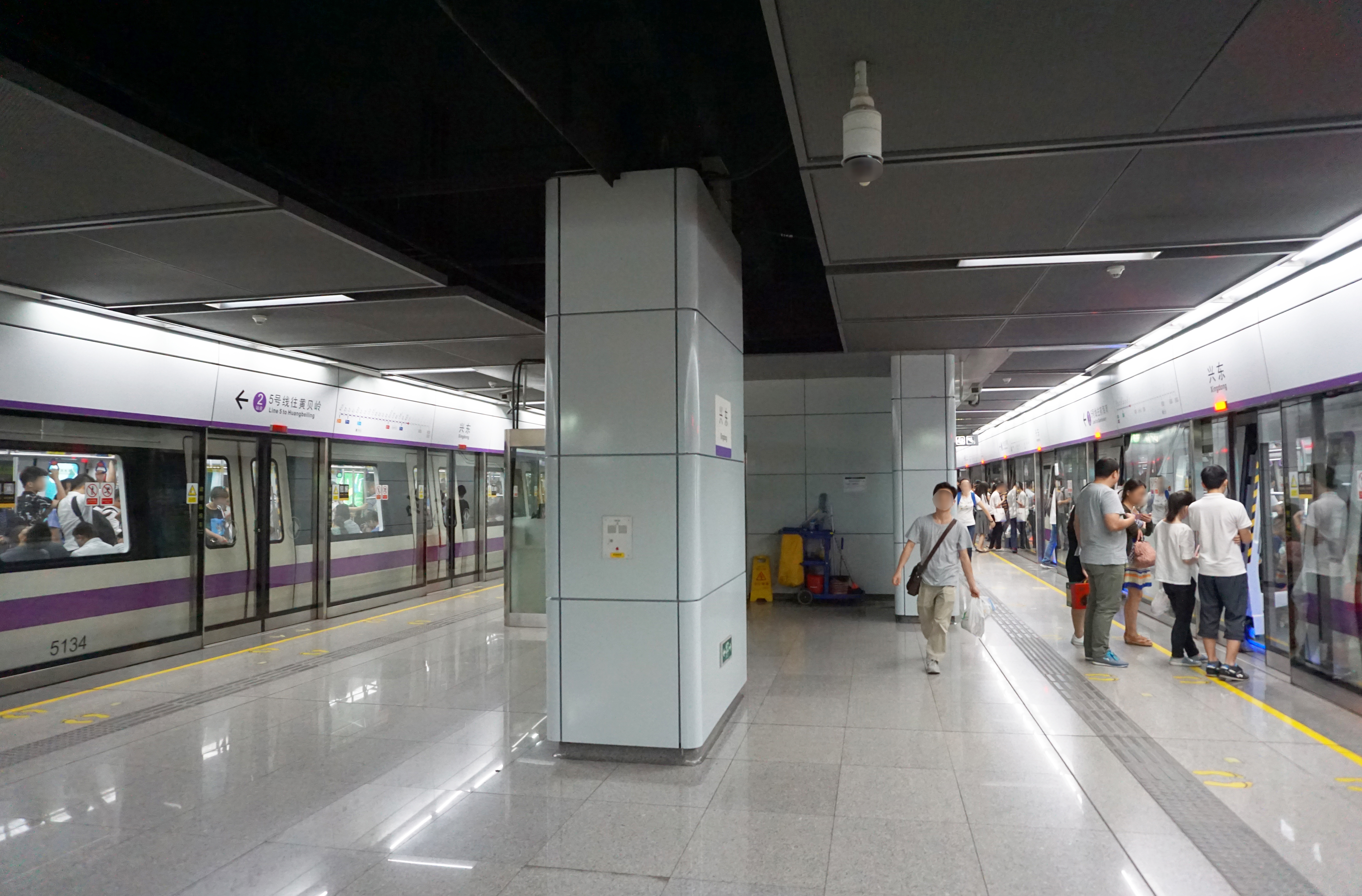
- Interior of Xingdong Station

General information
- Location: Bao'an District, Shenzhen, Guangdong; China
- Operator: SZMC (Shenzhen Metro Group)
- Line: Line 5

History
- Opened: 22 June 2011

Services
Preceding station	Shenzhen Metro	Following station
Liuxiandong towards Grand Theater	Line 5	Honglang North towards Chiwan
Location

Xingdong station (Chinese: 兴东站; pinyin: Xīngdōng Zhàn; Jyutping: hing^{1} dung^{1} zaam^{6}) is an underground station on Line 5 of the Shenzhen Metro. It opened on 22 June 2011.

== Station layout ==
G	-	Exit
B1F; Concourse	Lobby	Customer Service, Shops, Vending machines, Automatic ticket vending machines
B2F; Platforms	Platform 1	← 5 towards Chiwan (Honglang North)→
B2F; Platforms	Island platform, doors will open on the left
B2F; Platforms	Platform 2	5 towards Grand Theater (Liuxiandong) →

== Exits ==
Exit	Destination
Exit A	Liuxian 3rd Road (W), Chuangye 2nd Road, Shenzhen Kingway Beer Food Court, Area 69 Cofco Industrial Park
Exit B	Liuxian 3rd Road, Chuangye 2nd Road (S), Kingway Beer Plaza
Exit C	Liuxian 3rd Road, Chuangye 2nd Road (N), Yangtian Road, Yangtian Building, Chuangye Ertian
Exit D	Liuxian 3rd Road, Chuangye 2nd Road (N), Chuangye Yicun, Shengang Driving School
