= Hubei station =

Metro station in Shenzhen, Guangdong, China

Coordinates: 22°32′39″N 114°7′31″E

Hubei 湖贝
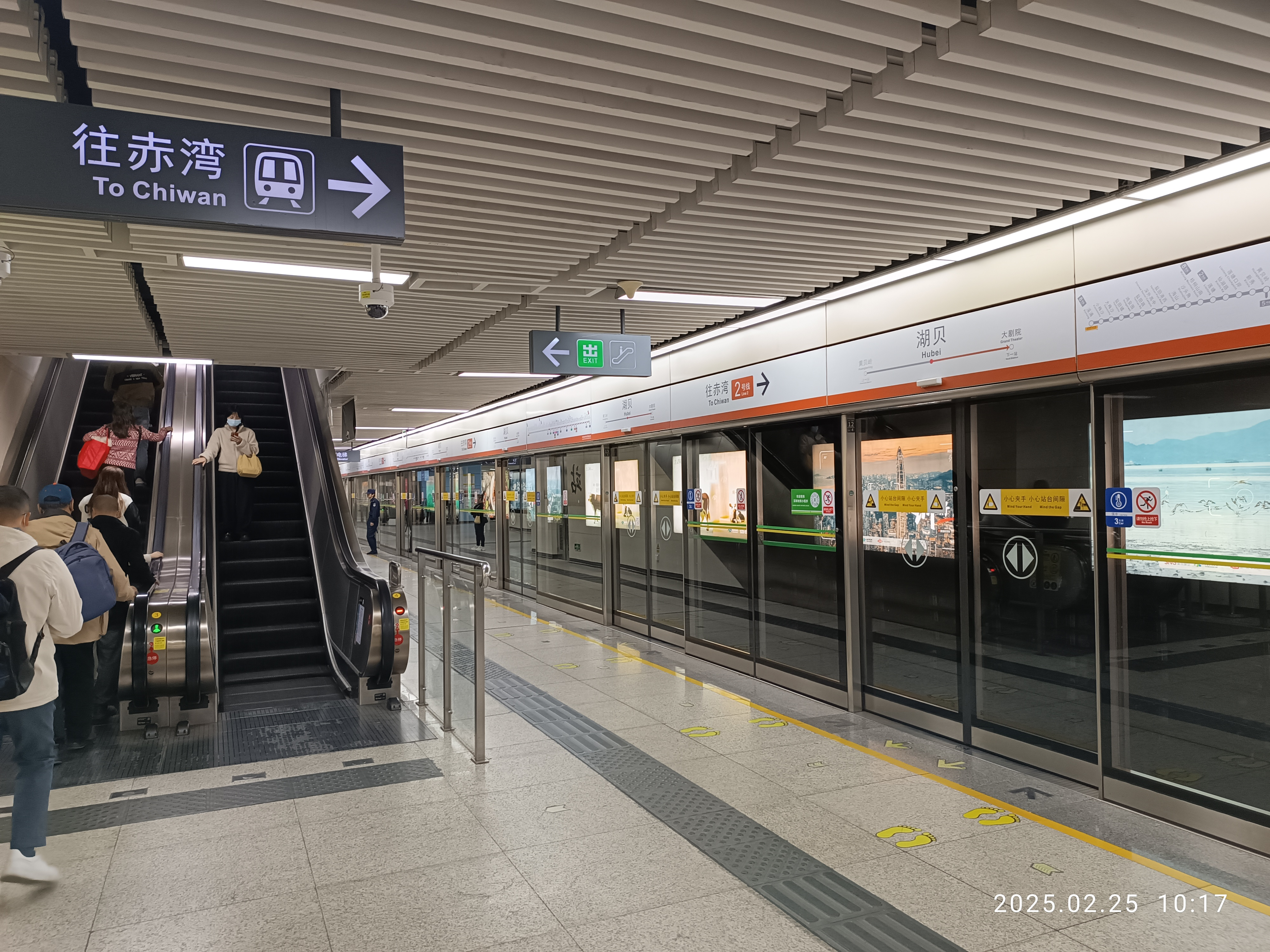
- Line 2 Platform to Chiwan

Chinese name
- Traditional Chinese: 湖貝
- Simplified Chinese: 湖贝
- Literal meaning: Lake shell
Transcriptions
Standard Mandarin
- Hanyu Pinyin: Hú Bèi
Yue: Cantonese
- Jyutping: Wu4 Bui3

General information
- Location: Shennan East Road, Nanhu Subdistrict, Luohu District, Shenzhen, Guangdong; China
- Operator: SZMC (Shenzhen Metro Group)
- Lines: Line 2; Line 5
- Platforms: 4 (2 split side platforms and 1 Island platform)
- Tracks: 4

Construction
- Structure type: Underground
- Platform levels: 2
- Accessible: Yes

Other information
- Station code: 227

History
- Opened: Line 2: 28 June 2011 (15 years ago); Line 5: 28 December 2025 (9 months ago)

Services
Preceding station	Shenzhen Metro	Following station
Grand Theater towards Chiwan	Line 2	Huangbeiling towards Liantang (Line 8: Xichong)
Dongmen towards Grand Theater	Line 5	Huangbeiling towards Chiwan
Route map
Location

Hubei station (traditional Chinese: 湖貝站; simplified Chinese: 湖贝站; pinyin: Húbèi Zhàn; Jyutping: wu4 bui3 zaam6) is an interchange station of Line 2 and Line 5 of the Shenzhen Metro. Line 2 platforms opened on 28 June 2011 and Line 5 platforms opened on 28 December 2025. This station is located underneath Shennan East Road.

== Station layout ==
G	-	Exit
B1F; Concourse	Lobby	Customer Service, Shops, Vending machines, ATMs
B2F; Platforms	Side platform, doors will open on the right
B2F; Platforms	Platform	← 2 towards Chiwan (Grand Theater)
B2F; Platforms	Platform	← 5 towards Grand Theater (Dongmen)
B2F; Platforms	Island platform, doors will open on the left
B2F; Platforms	Platform	5 towards Chiwan (Huangbeiling) →
B3F; Platforms	Side platform, doors will open on the left
B3F; Platforms	Platform	8 towards Xichong (Huangbeiling) →

== Entrances/exits ==
Exits	Pictures	Destinations
A		South Side of Shennan East Road (E), West Side of Nanji Road, North Side of Fengchun Road, Nanhu Sub-district Office of Luohu District, Luohu Art Gallery, Guangshen Building
B		North Side of Shennan East Road (E), Hubei Road, Leyuan Road, Luohu Cultural Park, Luohu Business Center, Luohu Traffic Police Battalian, Luohu Branch of Shenzhen Public Security Bureau, Shenzhen Luohu Hubei Primary School, Hurun Building, Huzhen Building, Dongmen Market
C		North Side of Shennan East Road (W), Dongmen Pedestrian Street, Zhenhua Building, Shenghua Building
D		South Side of Shennan East Road (W), Xiangxi Road, Xiangxicun, Shenzhen Far-East Women and Children Hospital, Zhongjian Building, Jincheng Building
E		North Side of Shennan East Road (W), Dongmen Middle Road, Dongmen Community Park
F		South Side of Shennan East Road (W), Dongmen Middle Road, Zhongjian, CSCEC Building, Jincheng Building, Bank of Guangzhou, Bank of China
G		South Side of Shennan East Road (E), Xiangxi Road, Shenzhen Far-East Women and Children Hospital, Luohu Rail Transit Police Station, Agricultural Bank of China

== Gallery ==
=== Line 2 ===
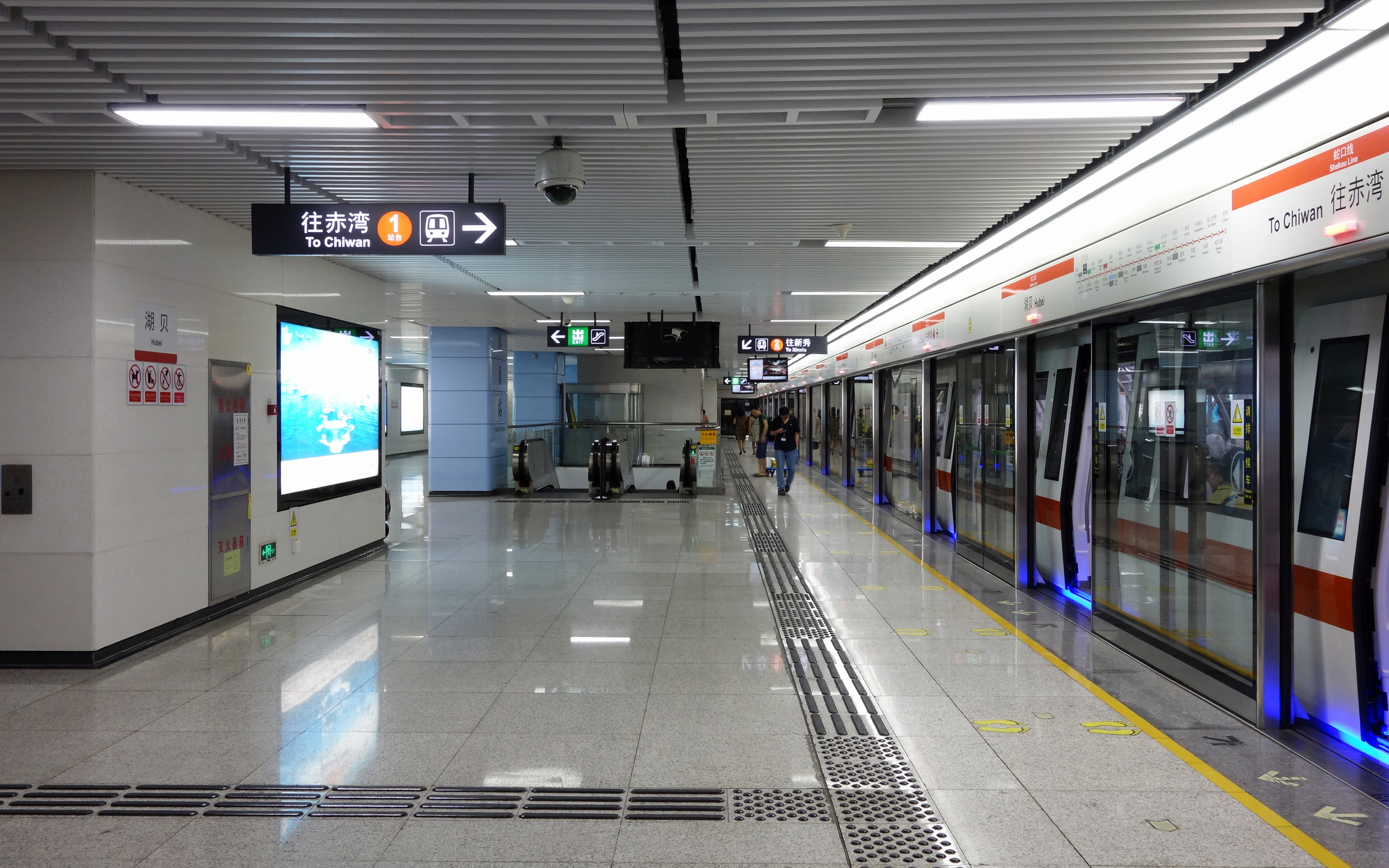
Line 2 Platform to Chiwan (2013)

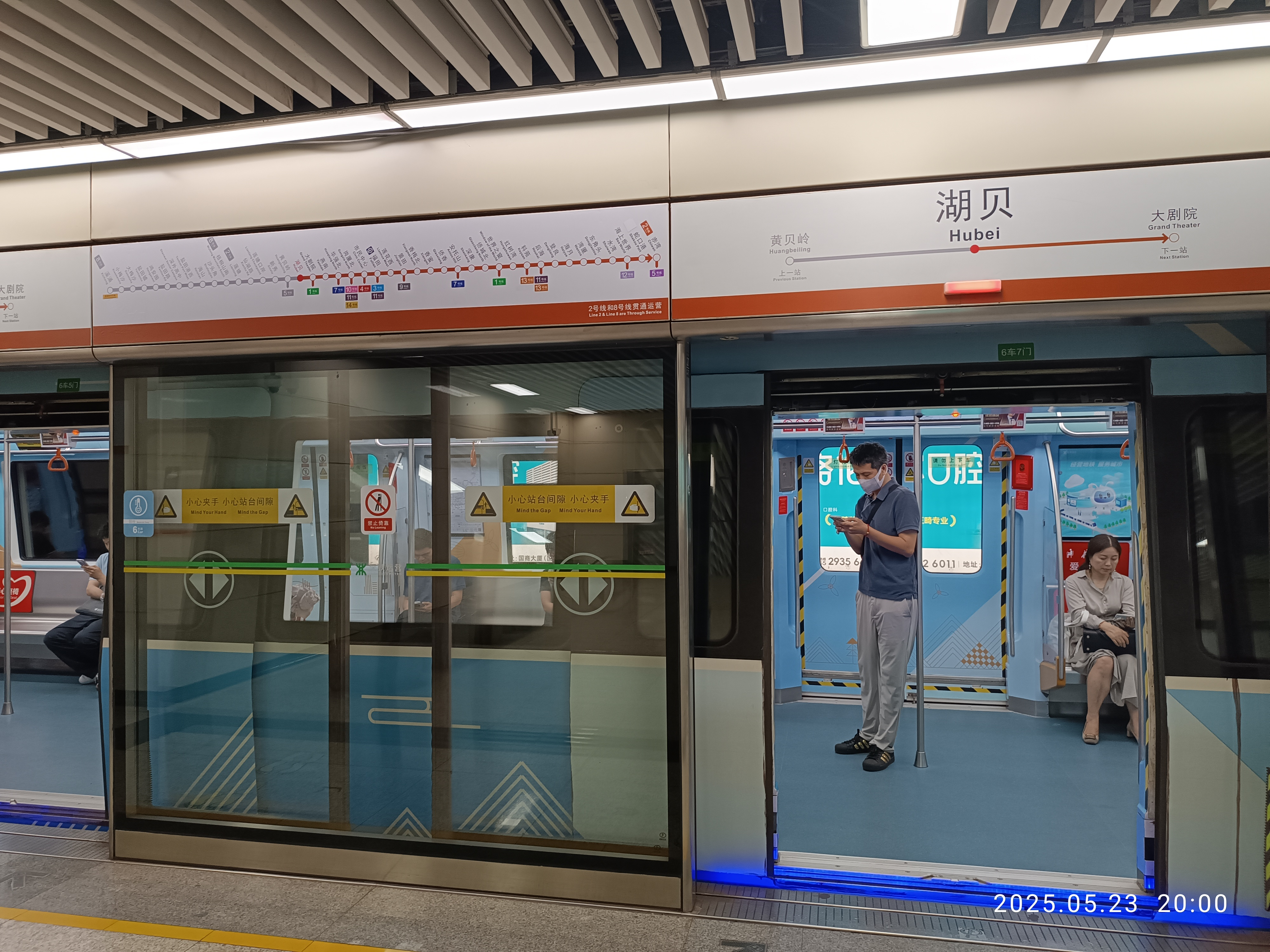
Line 2 Platform to Chiwan (2025)

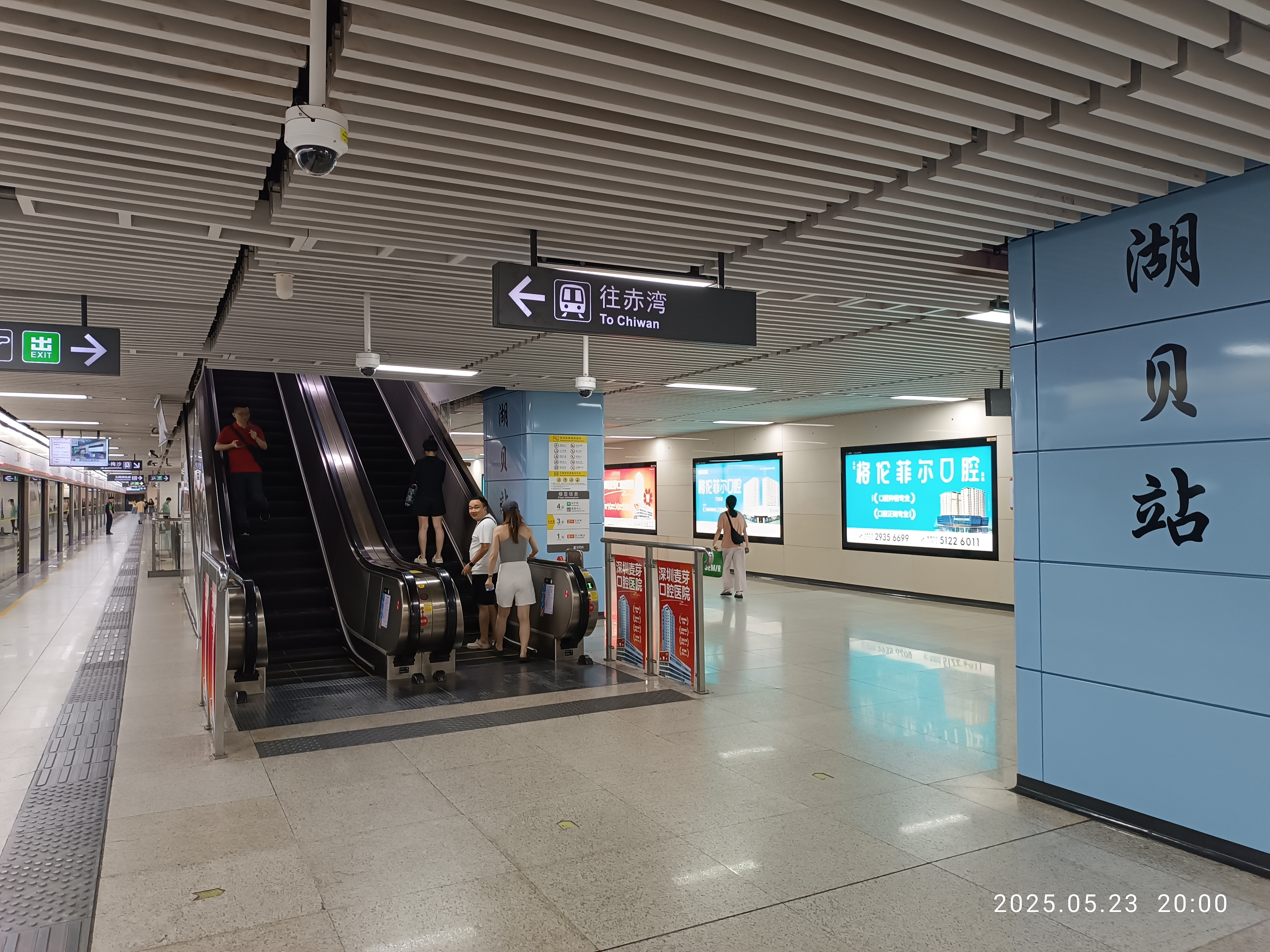
Line 2 Platform to Chiwan with Escalators (2025)

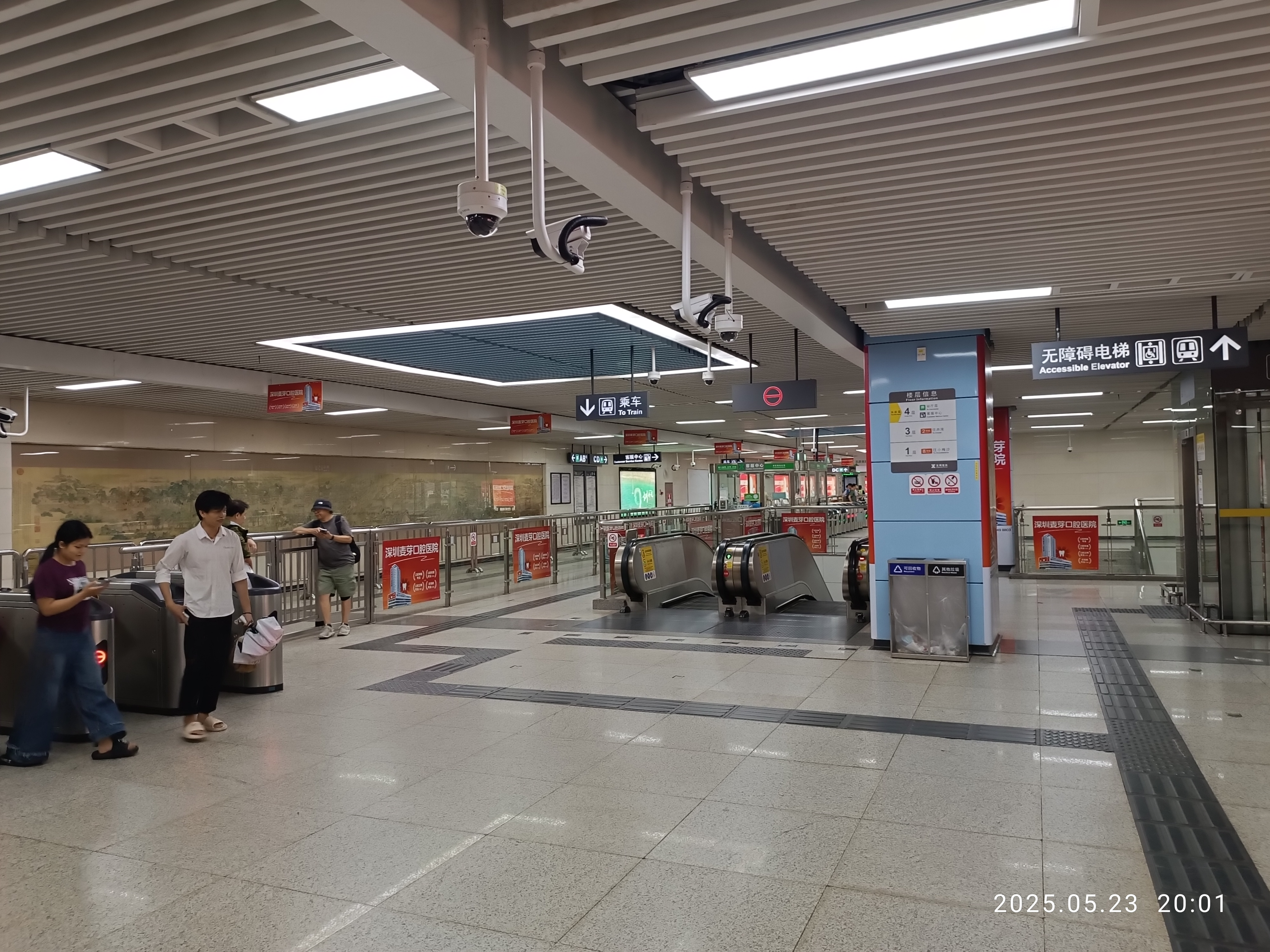
Line 2 Concourse (2025)

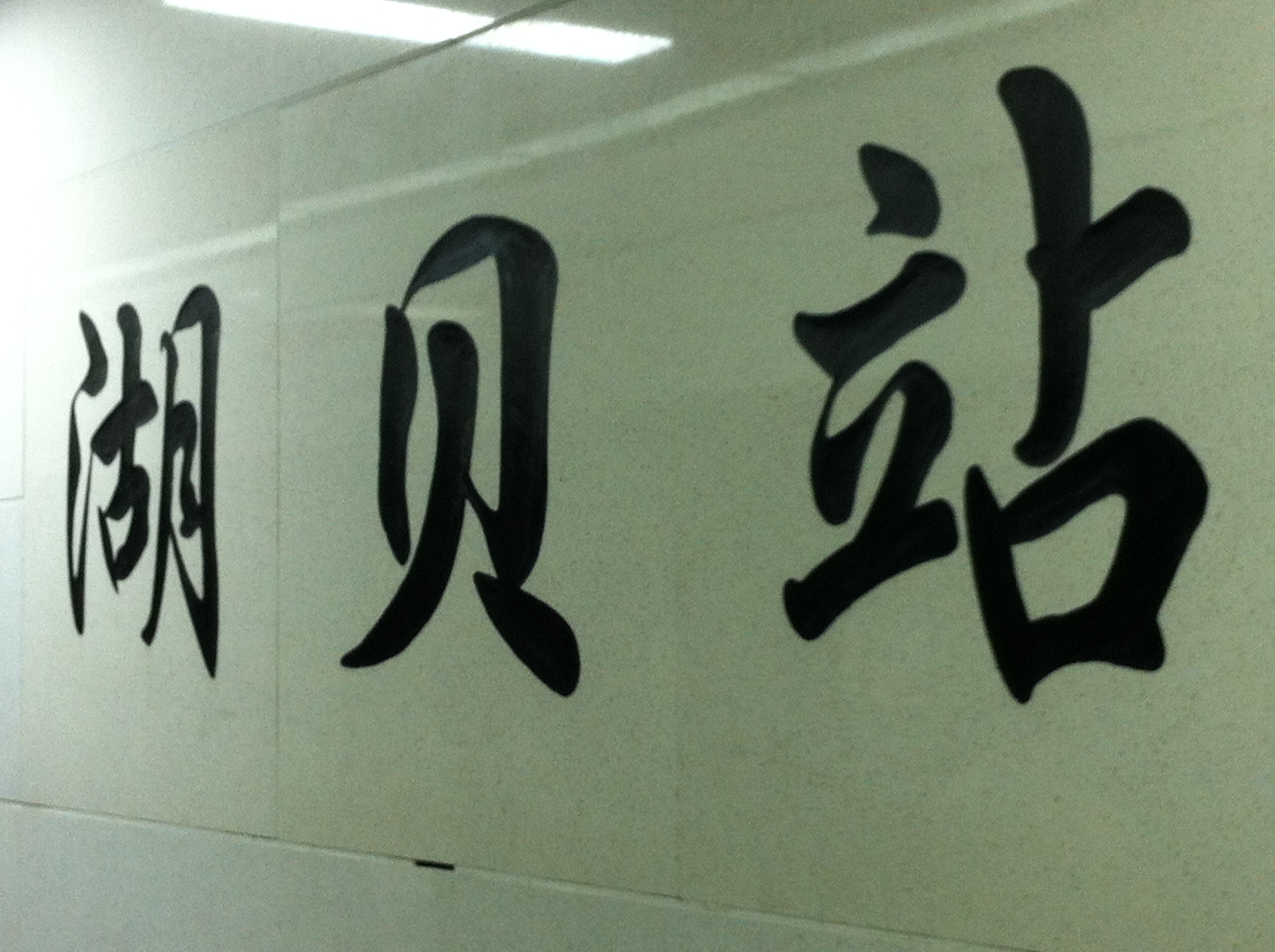
Line 2 Platform Calligraphy (2012)

=== Line 5 ===
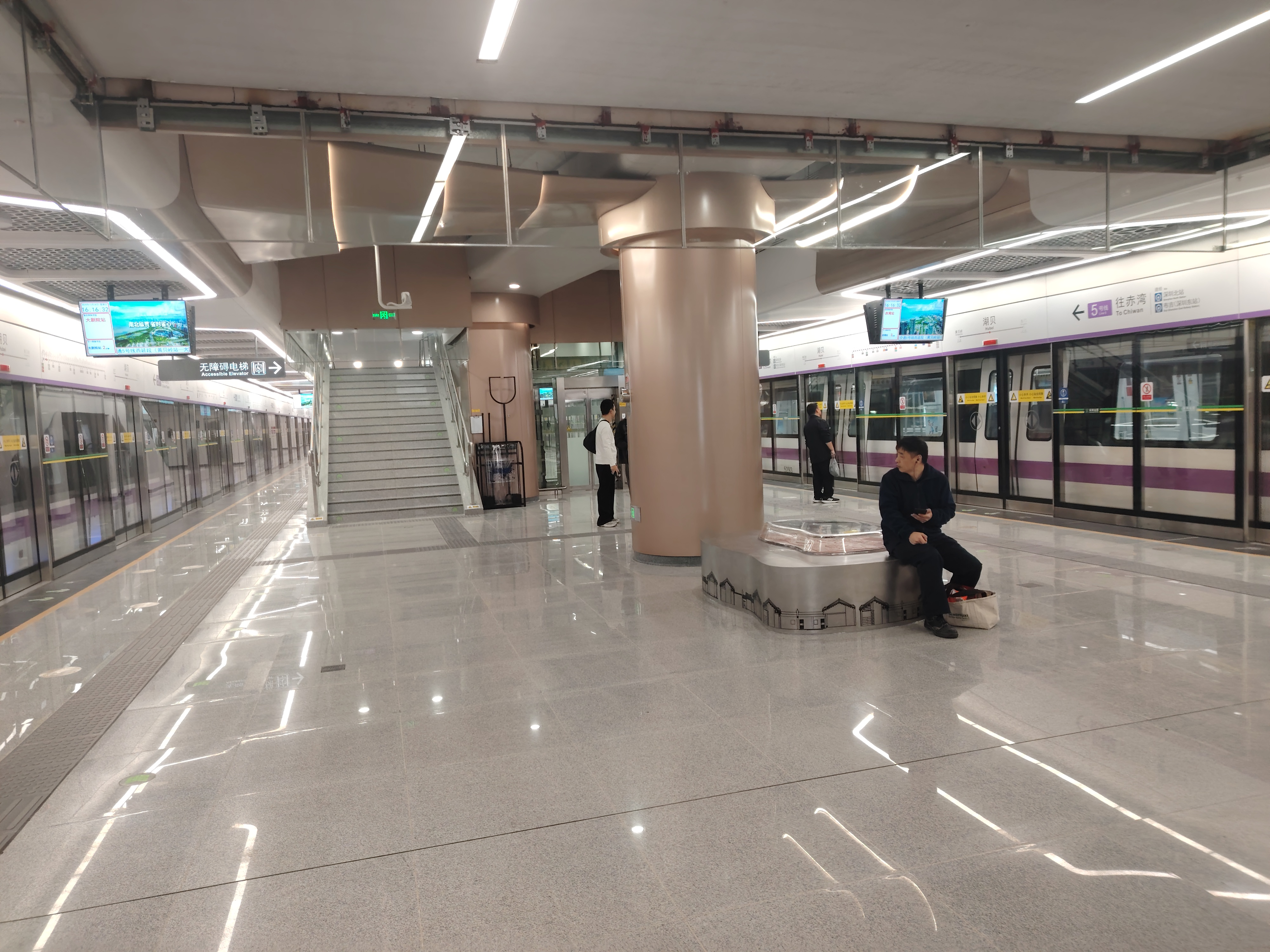
Line 5 Platforms (2025)

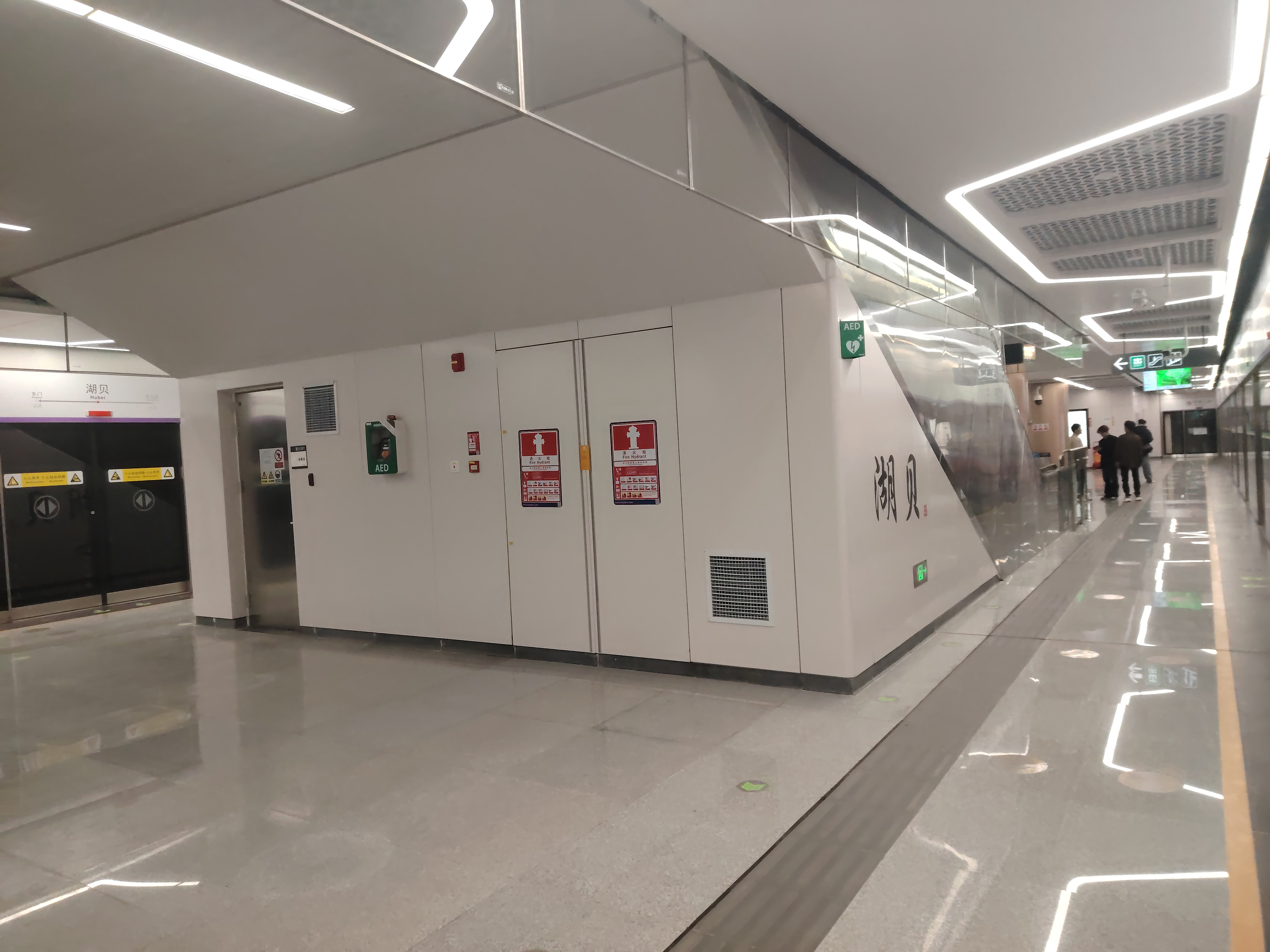
Line 5 Platforms (behind Escalators) (2025)

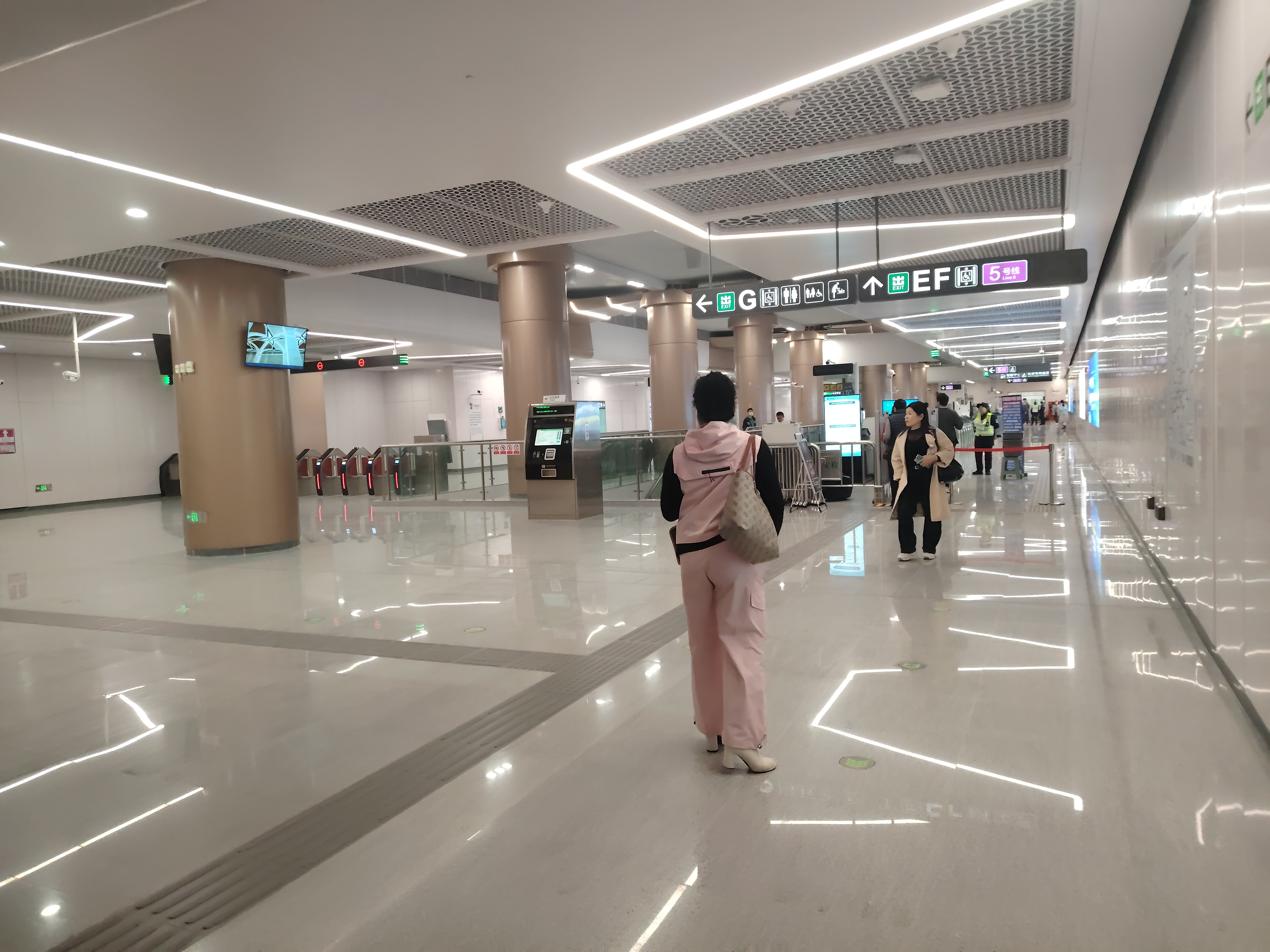
Line 5 Concourse (2025)
