= Yangmei station (Shenzhen Metro) =

Metro station in Shenzhen, China

Coordinates: 22°37′36″N 114°4′48″E

Yangmei 杨美
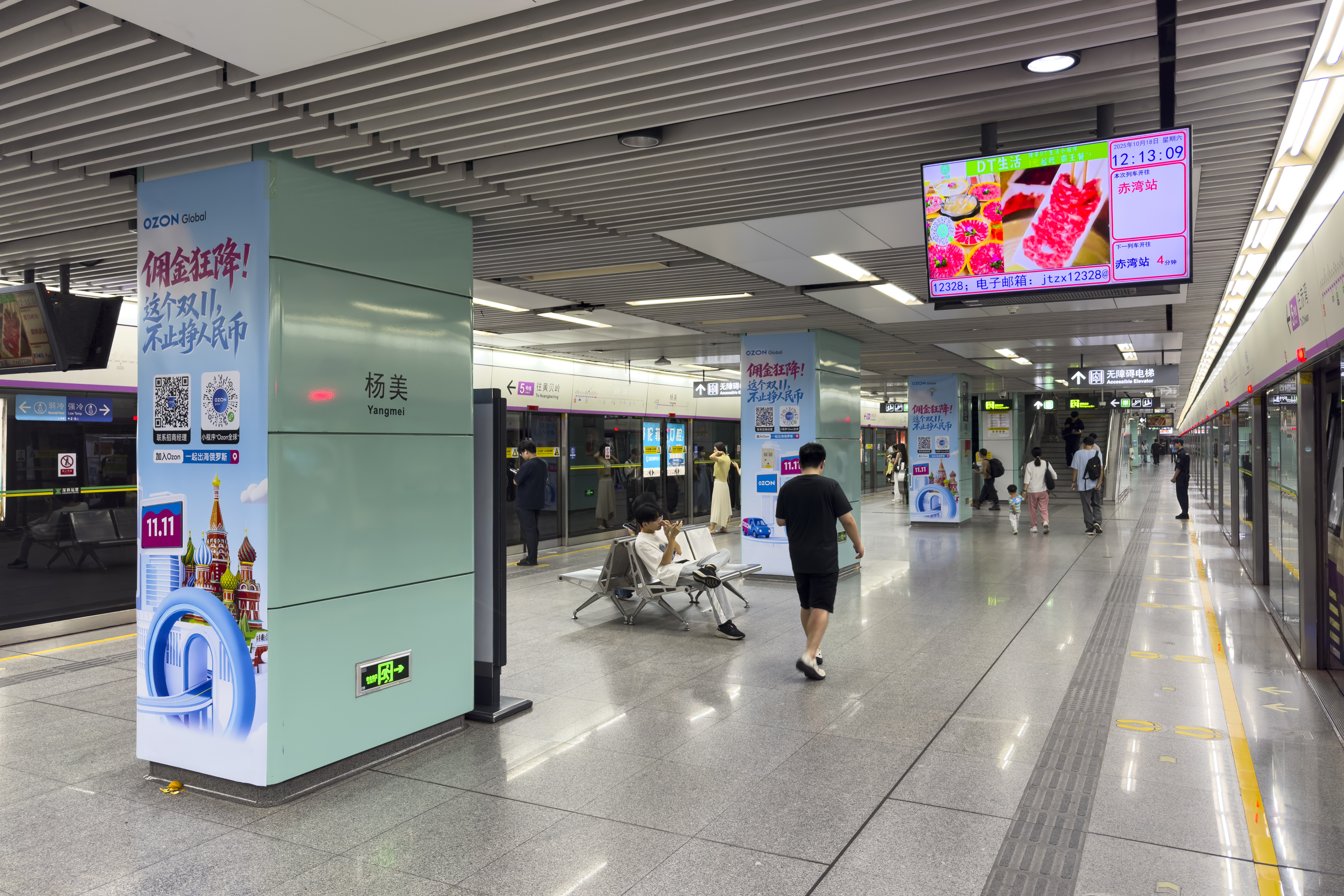
- Yangmei Station

General information
- Location: Longgang District, Shenzhen, Guangdong; China
- Operator: SZMC (Shenzhen Metro Group)
- Line: Line 5

History
- Opened: 22 June 2011

Services
Preceding station	Shenzhen Metro	Following station
Shangshuijing towards Grand Theater	Line 5	Bantian towards Chiwan
Location

Yangmei station (Chinese: 杨美站; pinyin: Yángměi Zhàn; Jyutping: joeng^{4} mei^{5} zaam^{6}) is a station on Line 5 of the Shenzhen Metro. Line 5 platforms opened on 22 June 2011. This station is located under the intersection of Bulong Road and Huancheng Road.

== Station layout ==
G	-	Exit
B1F; Concourse	Lobby	Customer Service, Shops, Vending machines, ATMs
B2F; Platforms	Platform 1	← 5 towards Chiwan (Bantian)
B2F; Platforms	Island platform, doors will open on the left
B2F; Platforms	Platform 2	→ 5 towards Grand Theater (Shangshuijing) →

== Exits ==
Exit number	The location can be arrived
Exit A	Bulong Road (S), Huancheng East Road (W)
Exit B	Bulong Road (S), Huancheng East Road (E), QiaoLian Village, Shunxing Industrial Estate
Exit C	Bulong Road (N), Huancheng East Road (E), Yangmei Community, Xinhuasheng Supermarket, Meijiafu Supermarket, Jiazhaoye ShangPin Apartment, Hongyang School, Kaisa Shangpin Garden
Exit D	Bulong Road (S), Huancheng East Road (W), Yangmei Community
