= Liuxiandong station =

Shenzhen Metro Line 5 and Line 13 station

Liuxiandong 留仙洞
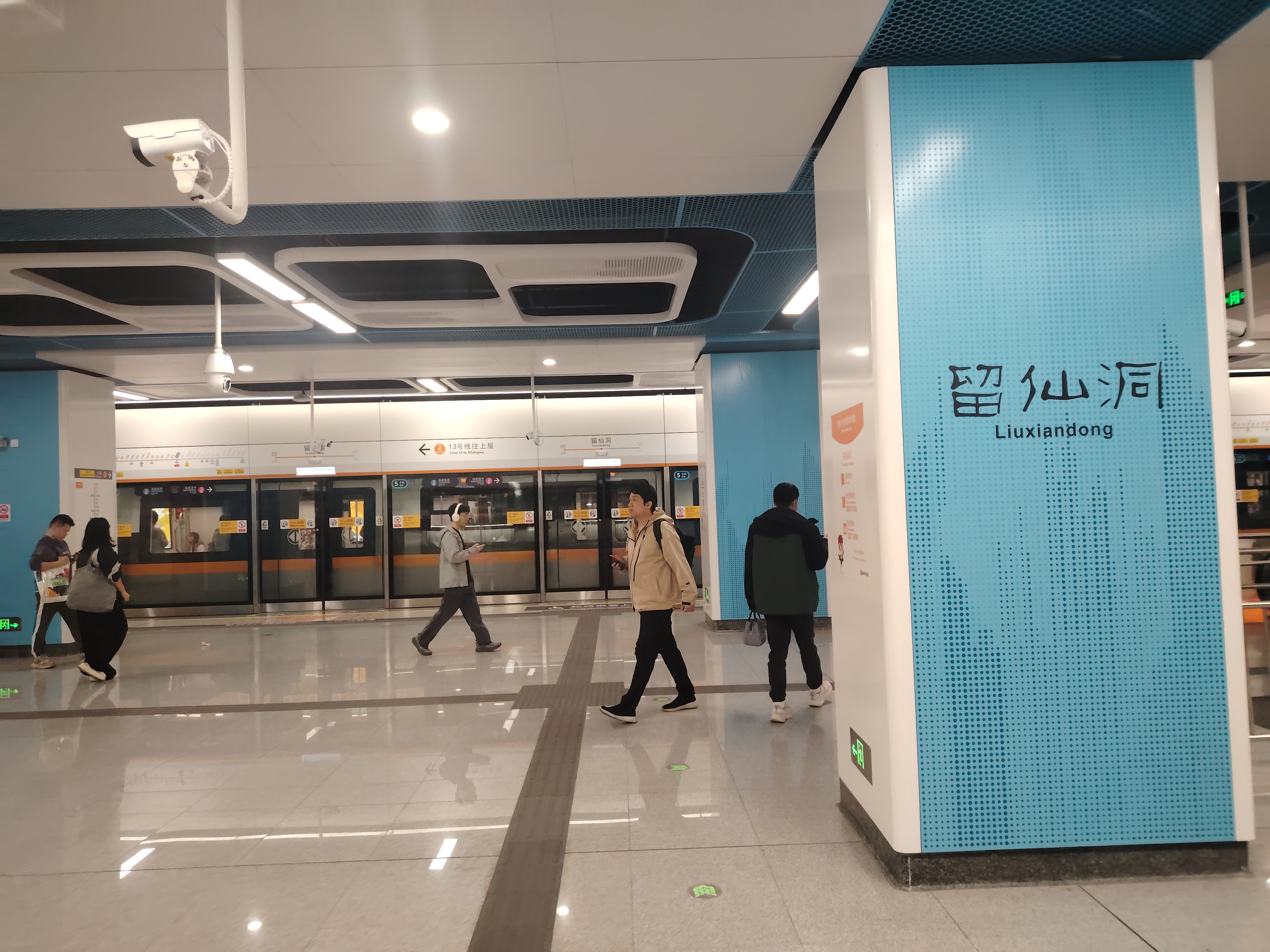
- Line 13 Platform

Chinese name
- Chinese: 留仙洞
Transcriptions
Standard Mandarin
- Hanyu Pinyin: Líuxiāndòng
Yue: Cantonese
- Yale Romanization: Làuhsīndúng
- Jyutping: lau^{4} sin^{1} dung^{6}

General information
- Location: Intersection of Liuxian Avenue (留仙大道) and Tongfa Road (同发路); Xili Subdistrict, Nanshan District, Shenzhen, Guangdong; China
- Coordinates: 22°35′0.31″N 113°56′20.83″E
- Operated by: SZMC (Shenzhen Metro Group)
- Lines: Line 5; Line 13
- Platforms: 4 (2 island platforms)
- Tracks: 4

Construction
- Structure type: Underground
- Accessible: Yes

History
- Opened: Line 5: 22 June 2011 (15 years ago); Line 13: 28 December 2025 (6 months ago)

Services
Preceding station	Shenzhen Metro	Following station
Xili towards Grand Theater	Line 5	Xingdong towards Chiwan
Shigu towards Shenzhen Bay Checkpoint	Line 13	Baiwang towards Lisonglang
Location

Liuxiandong station (Chinese: 留仙洞站; pinyin: Líuxiāndòng Zhàn; Jyutping: lau^{4} sin^{1} dung^{6} zaam^{6}; Cantonese Yale: Làuhsīndúng Jaahm) is an interchange station on Line 5 and Line 13 of the Shenzhen Metro. The Line 5 station opened on 22 June 2011, and the Line 13 was extended to the station on 28 December 2025, with a full renovation happening between January 23 and February 1 of 2026.

This station is located at the intersection of Liuxian Avenue, Tongfa Road, and Tongfa South Road.

== Station layout ==
G	-	Exits A-F
B1F; Concourse	Lobby	Customer Service, Shops, Vending machines, ATMs
B2F; 5 Platforms		5 towards Chiwan (Xingdong)
B2F; 5 Platforms	Island platform, doors will open on the left
B2F; 5 Platforms		5 towards Grand Theater (Xili)
B3F; 13 Platforms	Platform 1	13 towards Shenzhen Bay Checkpoint (Shigu)
B3F; 13 Platforms	Island platform, doors will open on the left
B3F; 13 Platforms	Platform 2	13 towards Lisonglang (Baiwang)

=== Gallery ===
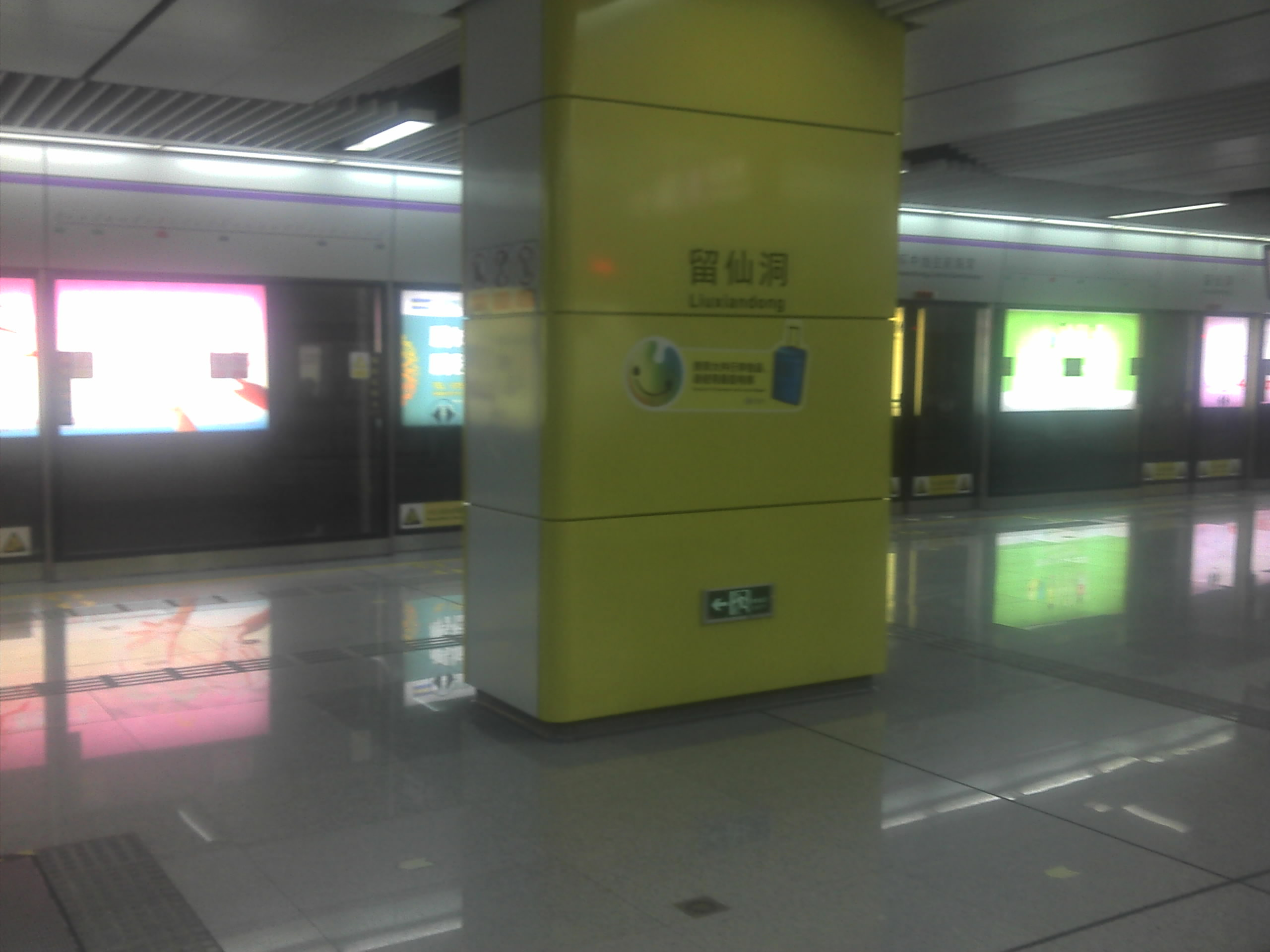
Line 5 Platform (2011)

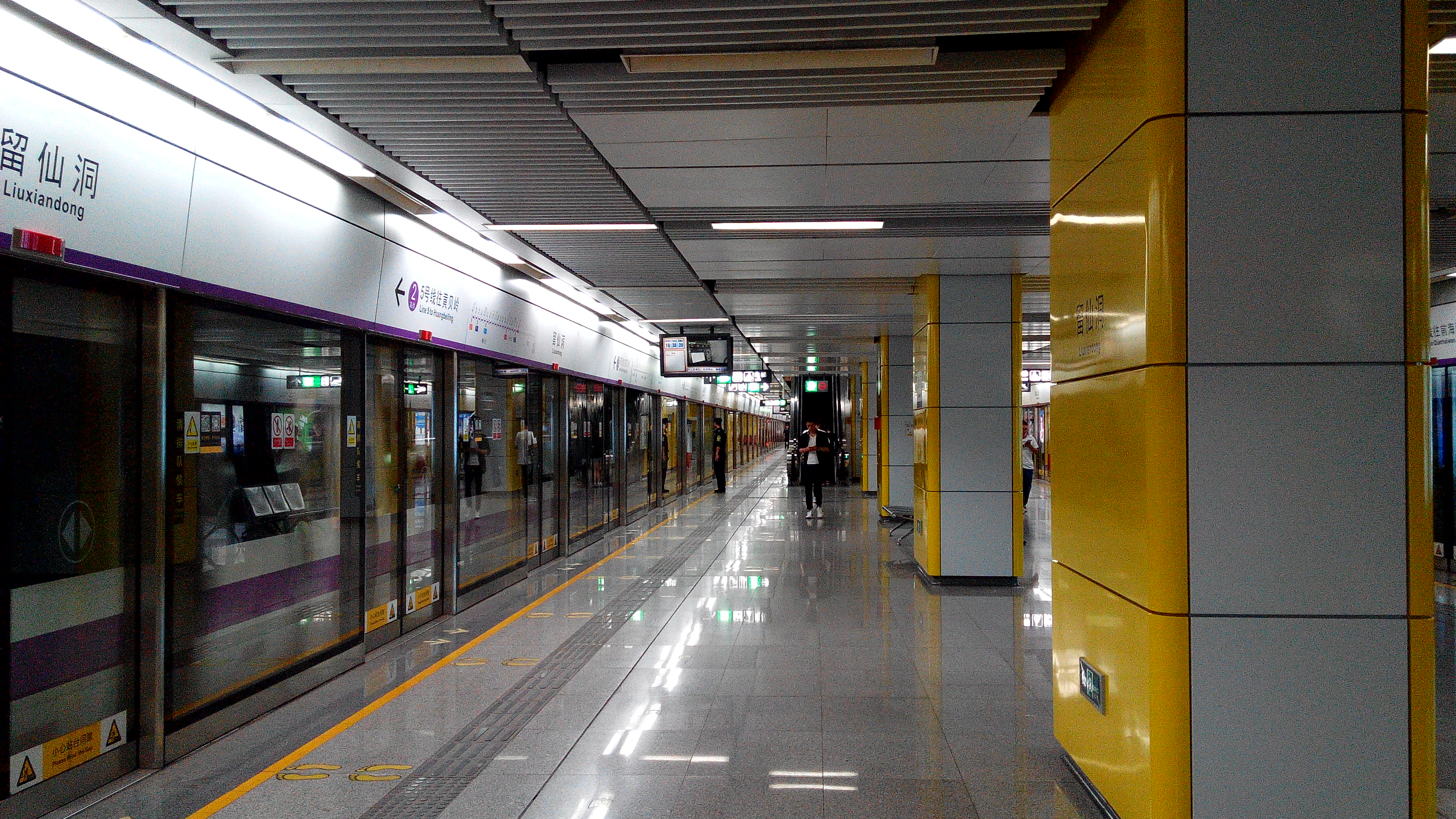
Line 5 Platform (2016)

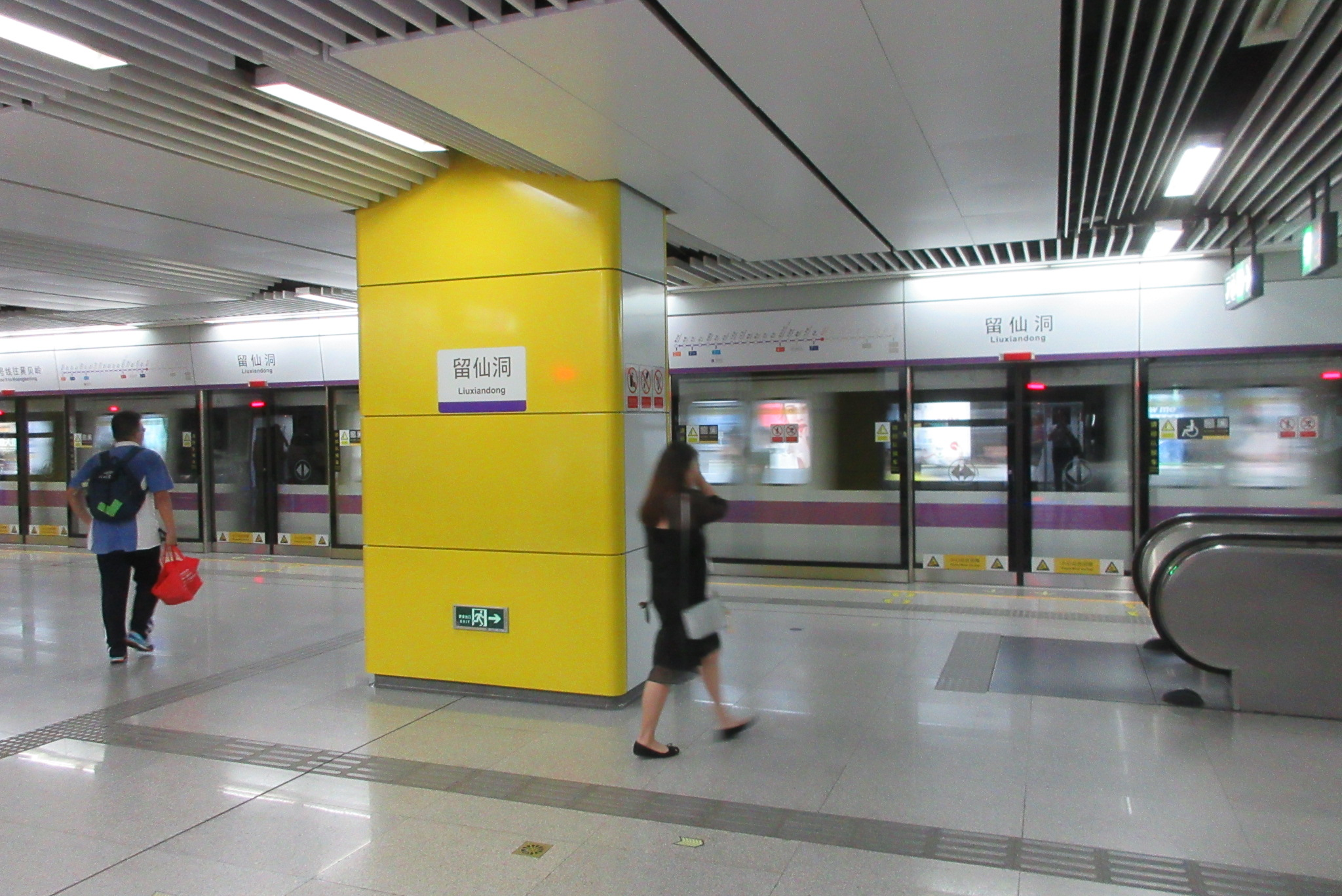
Line 5 Platform (2017)

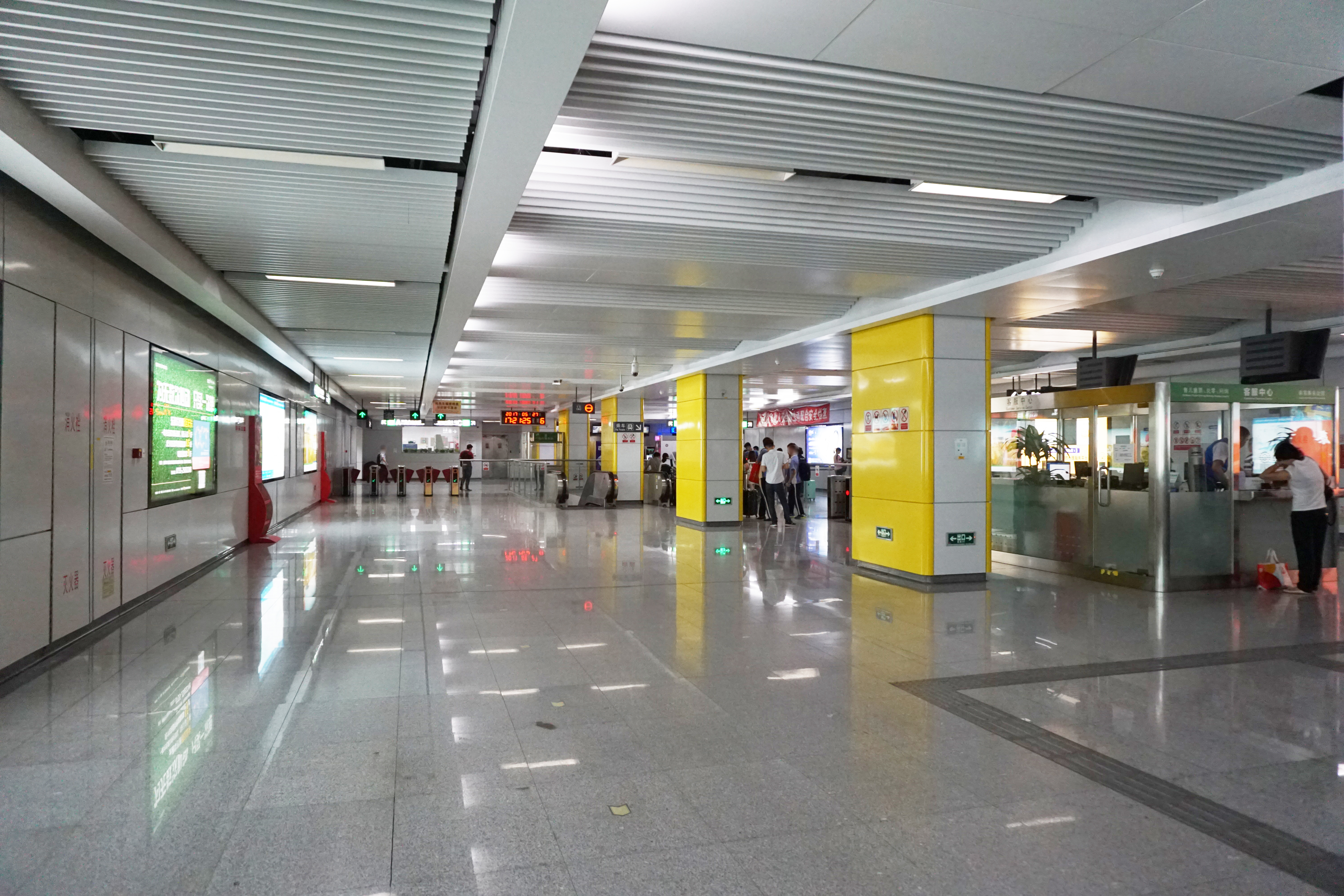
Line 5 Concourse

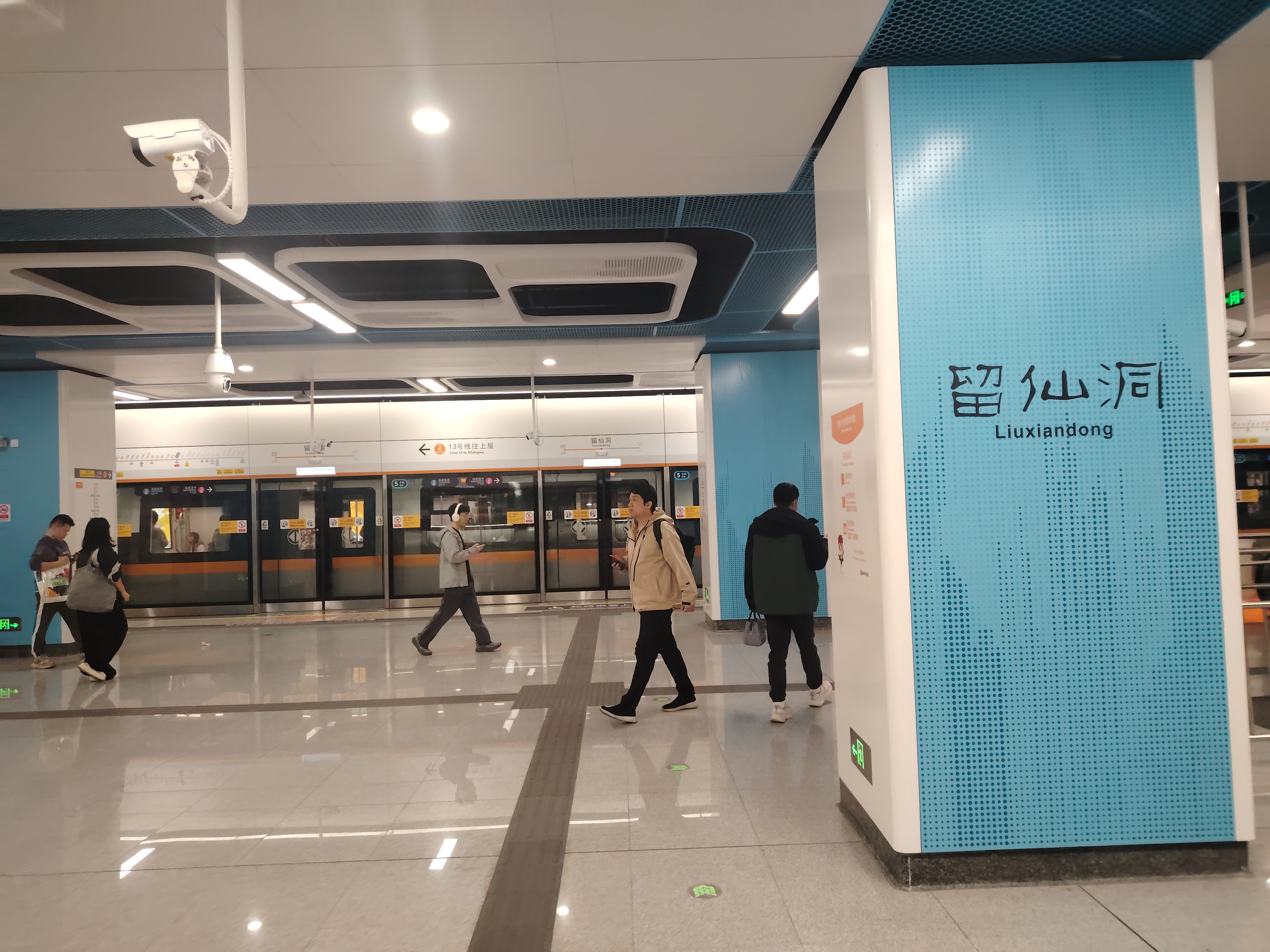
Line 13 Platform

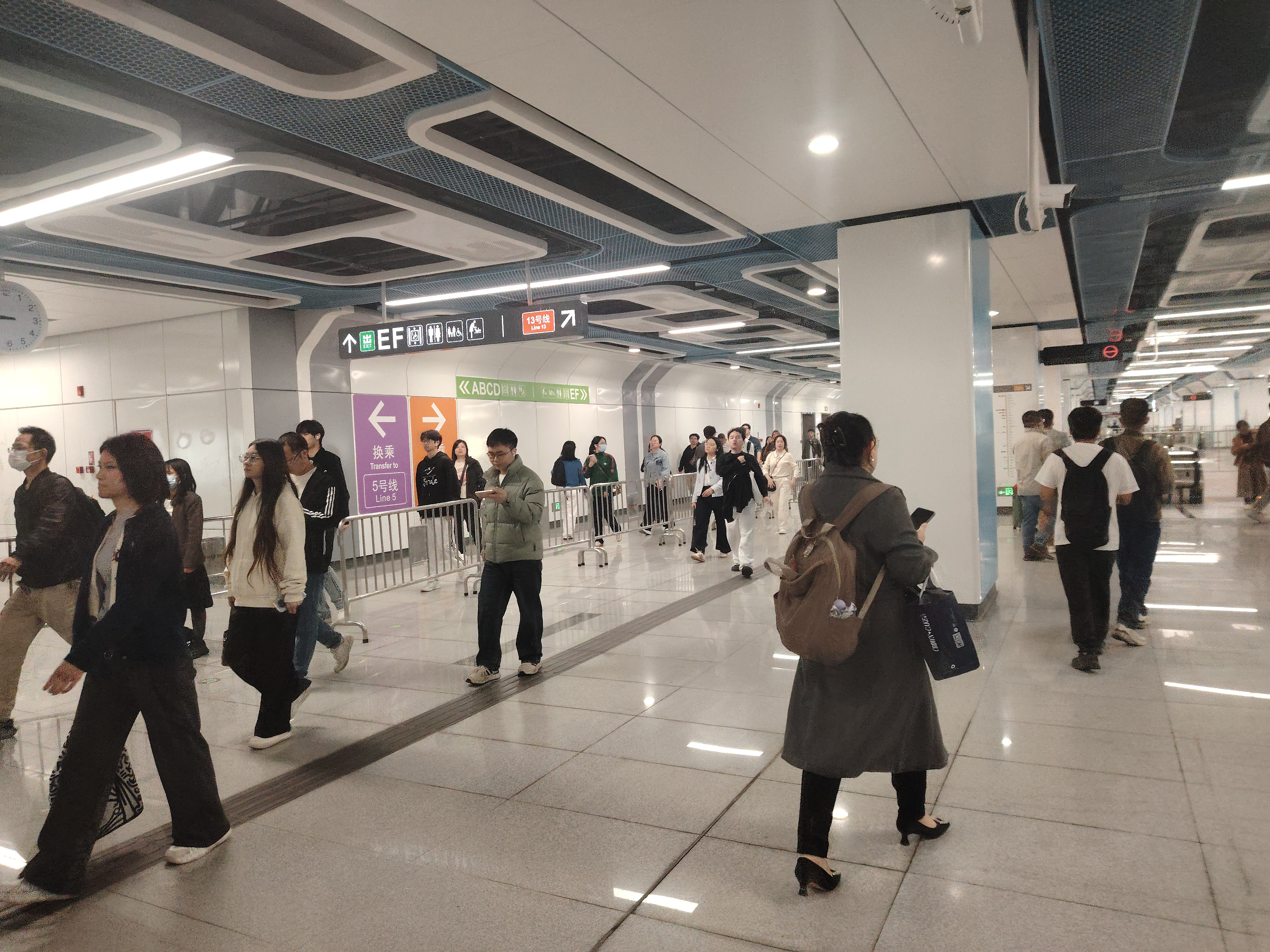
Line 13 Concourse

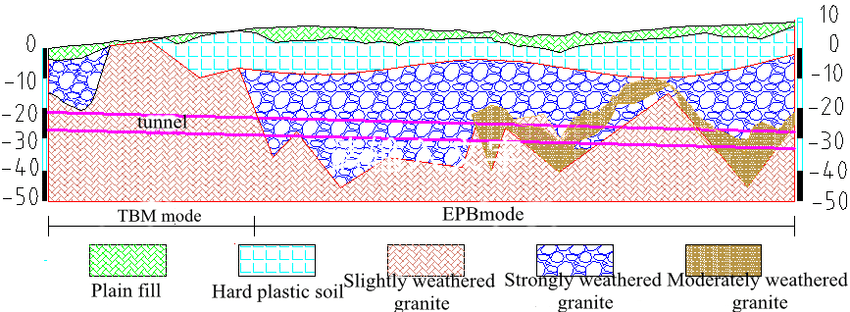
Geological profile of Liuxiandong station's middle airshaft section

=== Entrances/exits ===
The station has 6 points of entry/exit. Exits E and F were added with the opening of the Line 13 station. Exits C-F are equipped with elevators.

- : Liuxian Avenue (S-W), Creative City, DJI Sky City, Shenzhen innoX
- : Liuxian Avenue (N-E), Tongfa Road (E), Yuefang Plaza, Baoneng Huafu, Liuxian House
- : Liuxian Avenue (N-W), Tongfa Road (W), Shenzhen Polytechnic University (Xili Campus), Xiandong Community
- : Liuxian Avenue (S-E), Transsion Building, Lepu Medical Technology Building, UBtech Robotics Building, Tinno Mobile Building, Southern University of Science and Technology Hospital
- : Tongfa Road (E), Liya Garden, Shenzhen Academy of Metrology & Quality Inspection, Guanlong Village, Nanshan Experimental Education Group Xili Lake School
- : Tongfa Road (W), Xili Lantian Garden, High School of Shenzhen Experimental School
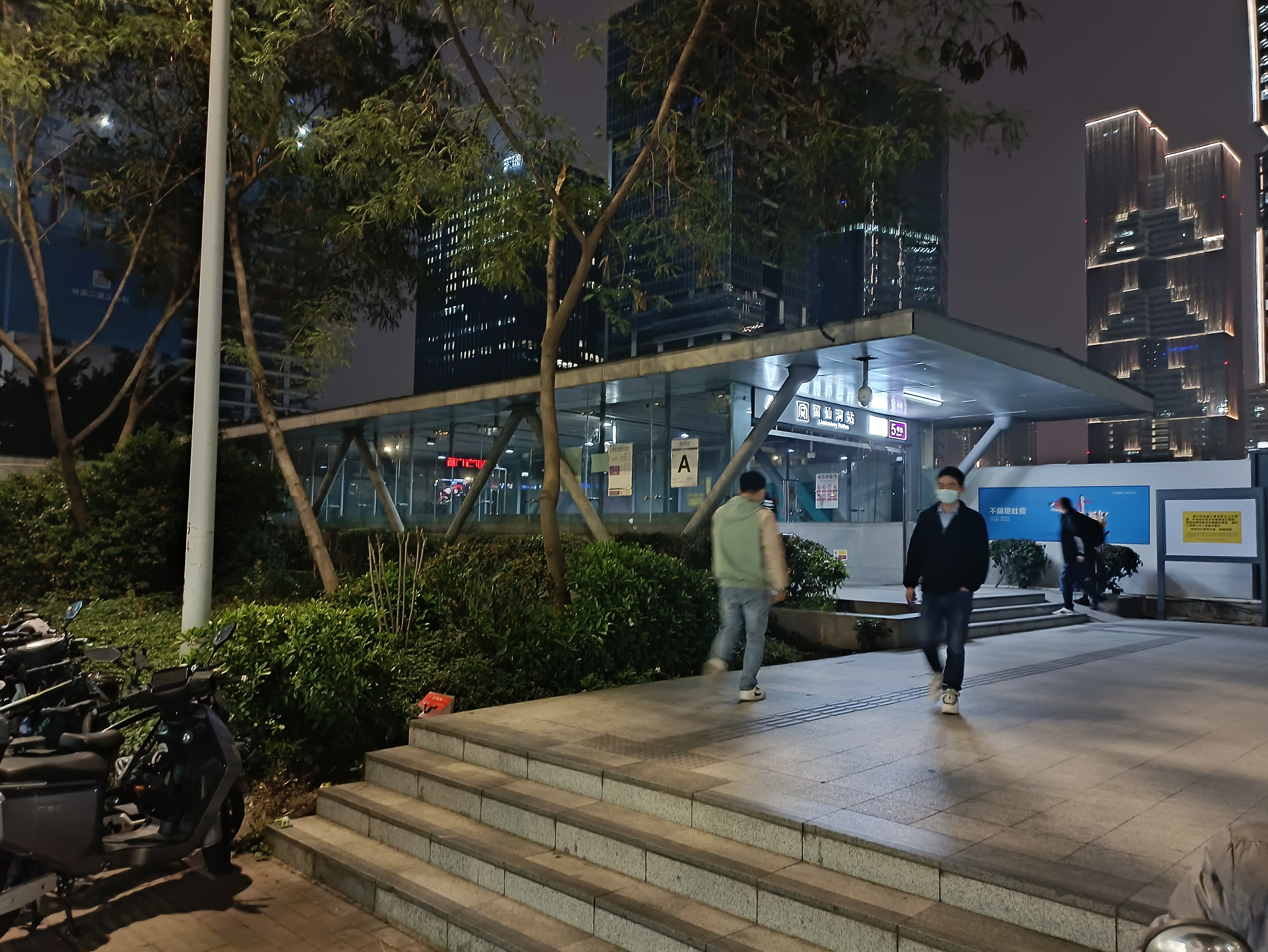
Entrance A

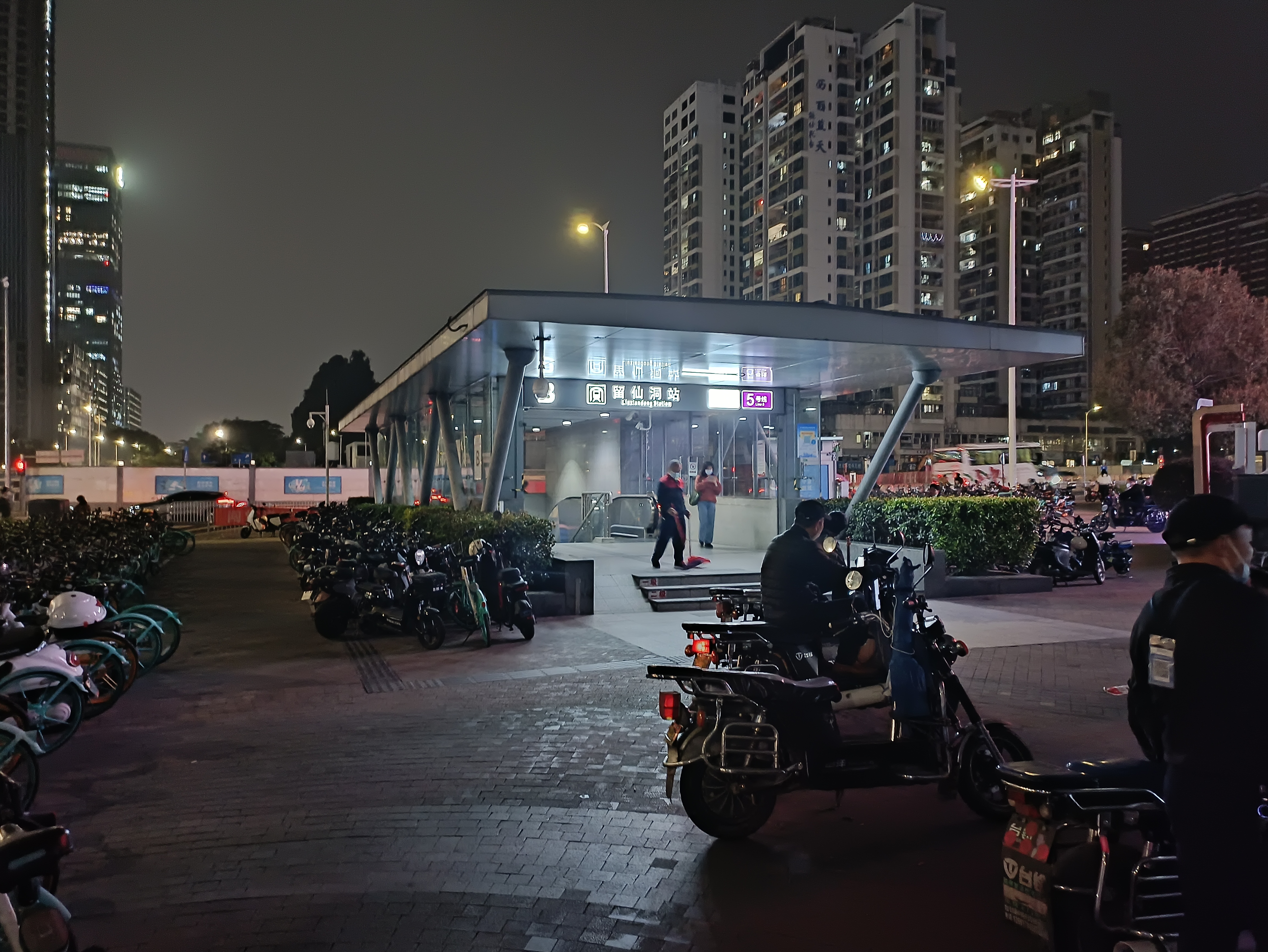
Entrance B

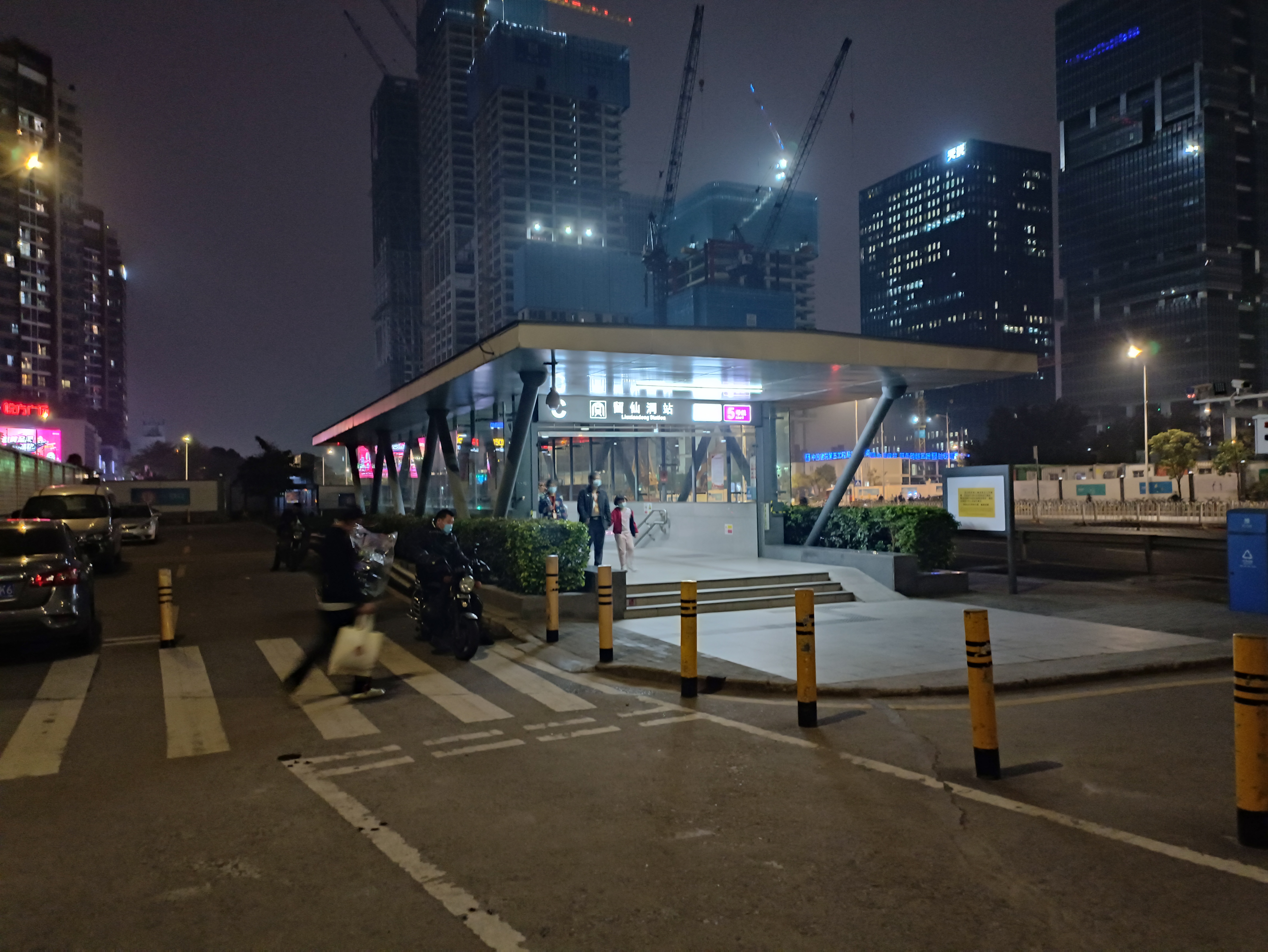
Entrance C

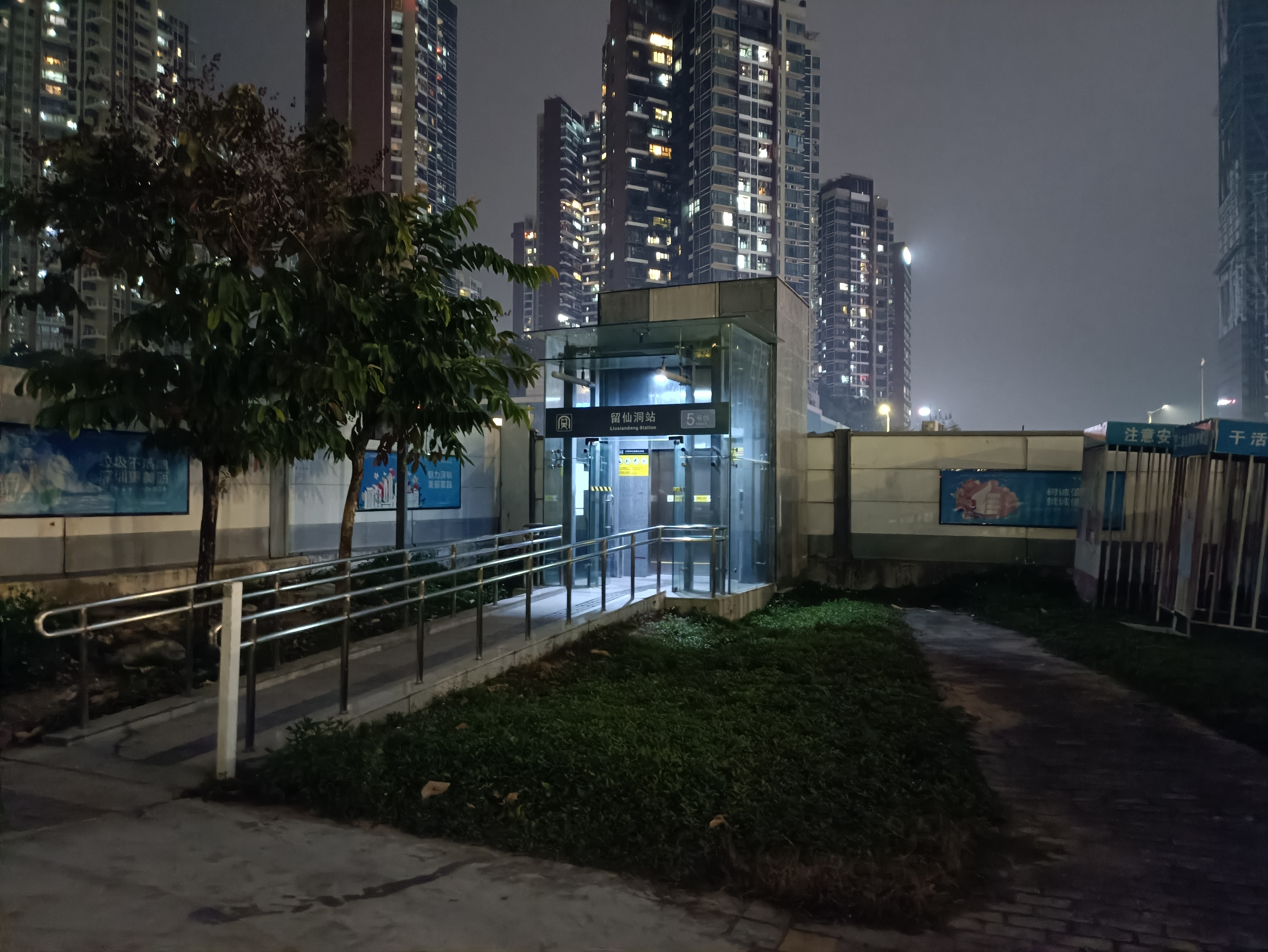
Entrance C (elevator entrance)

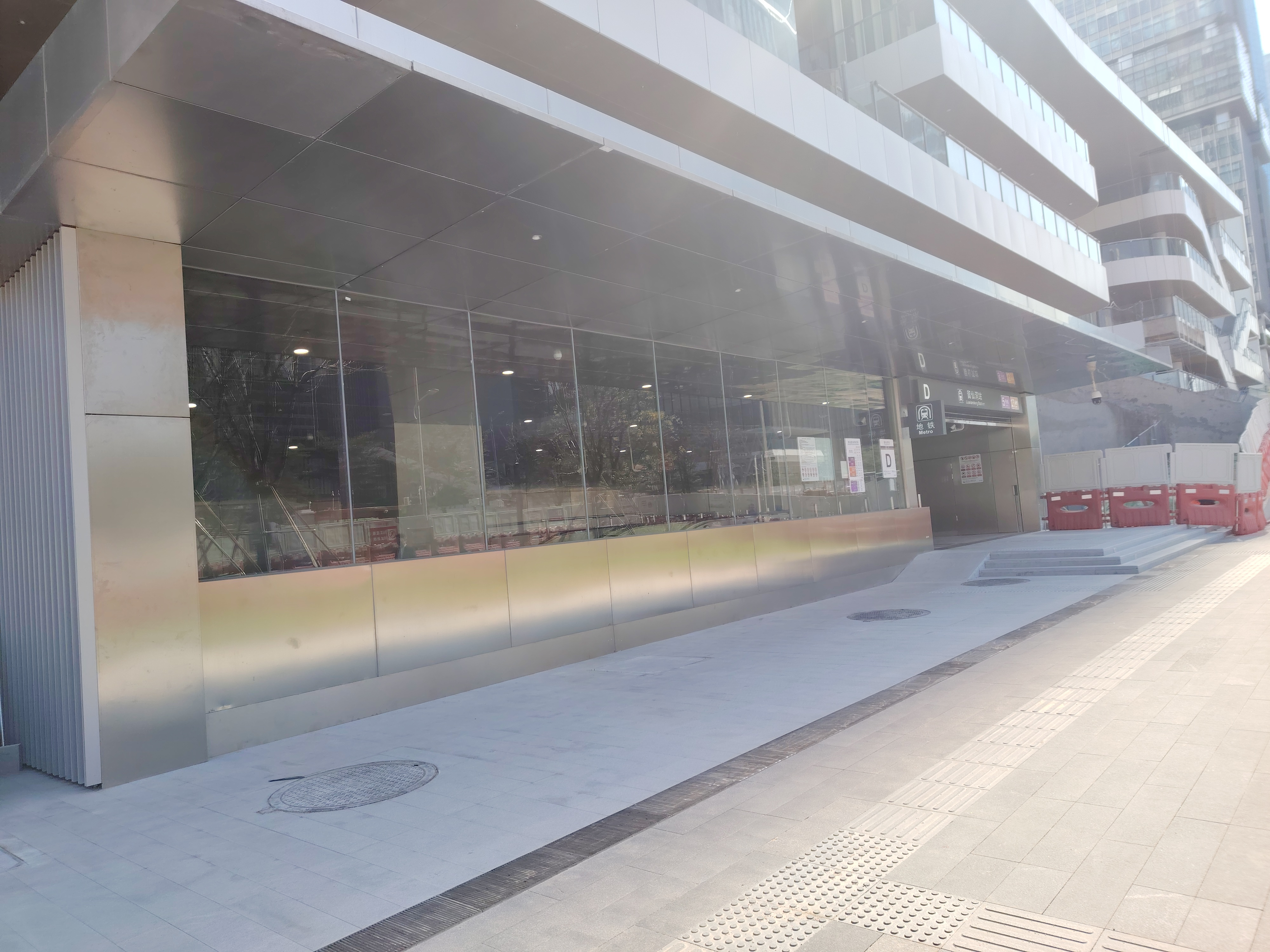
Entrance D

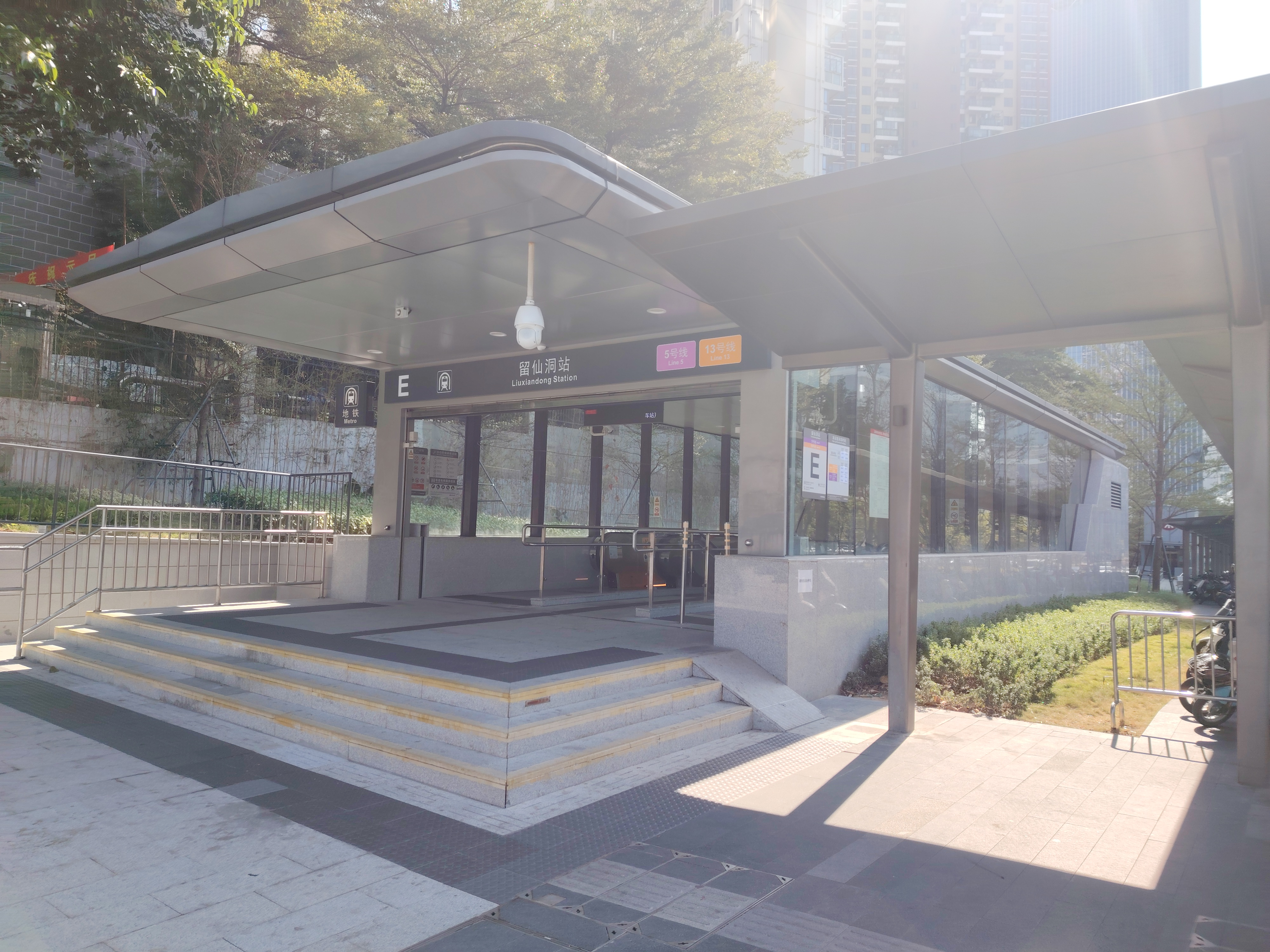
Entrance E

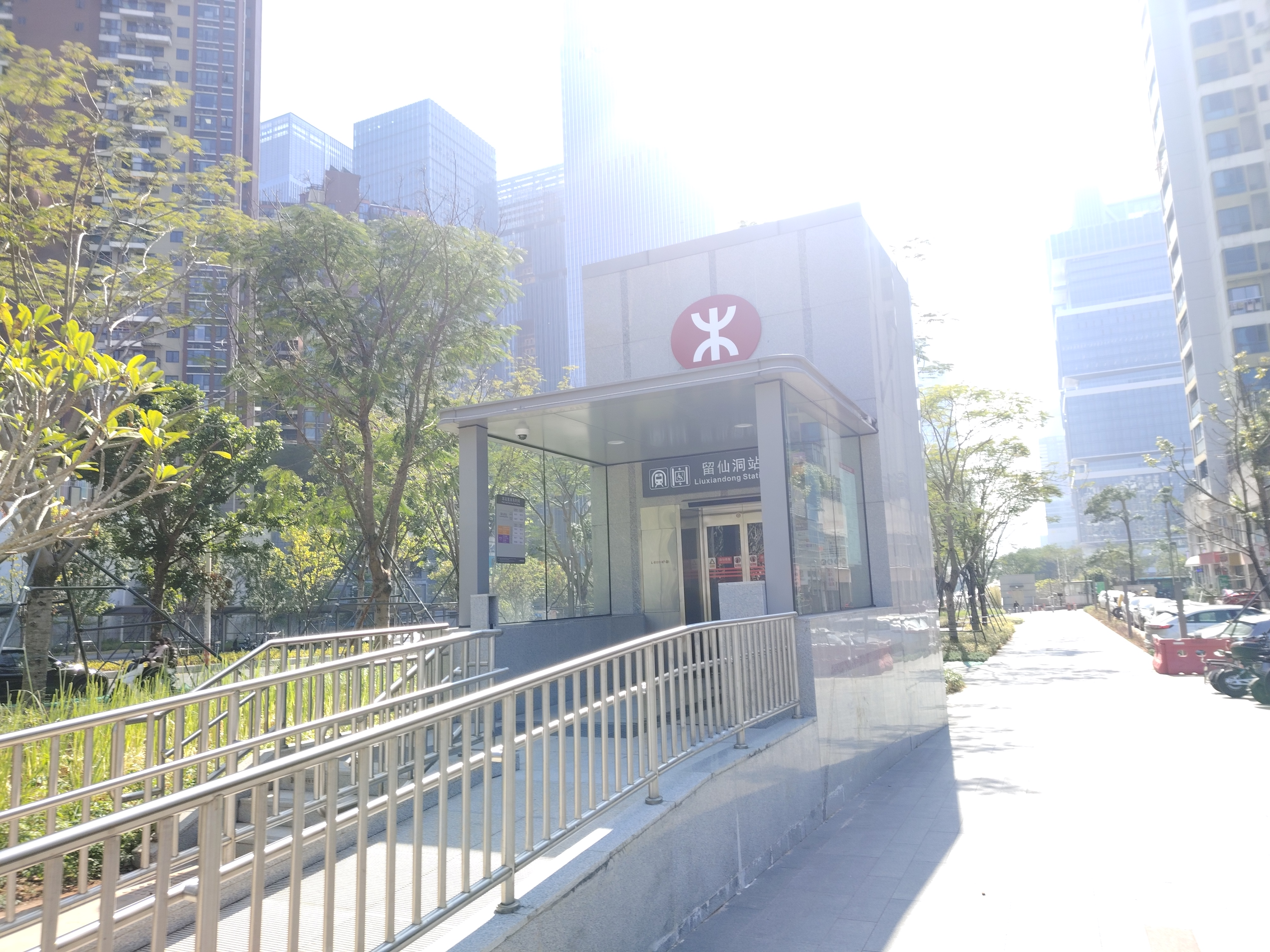
Entrance E (elevator entrance)

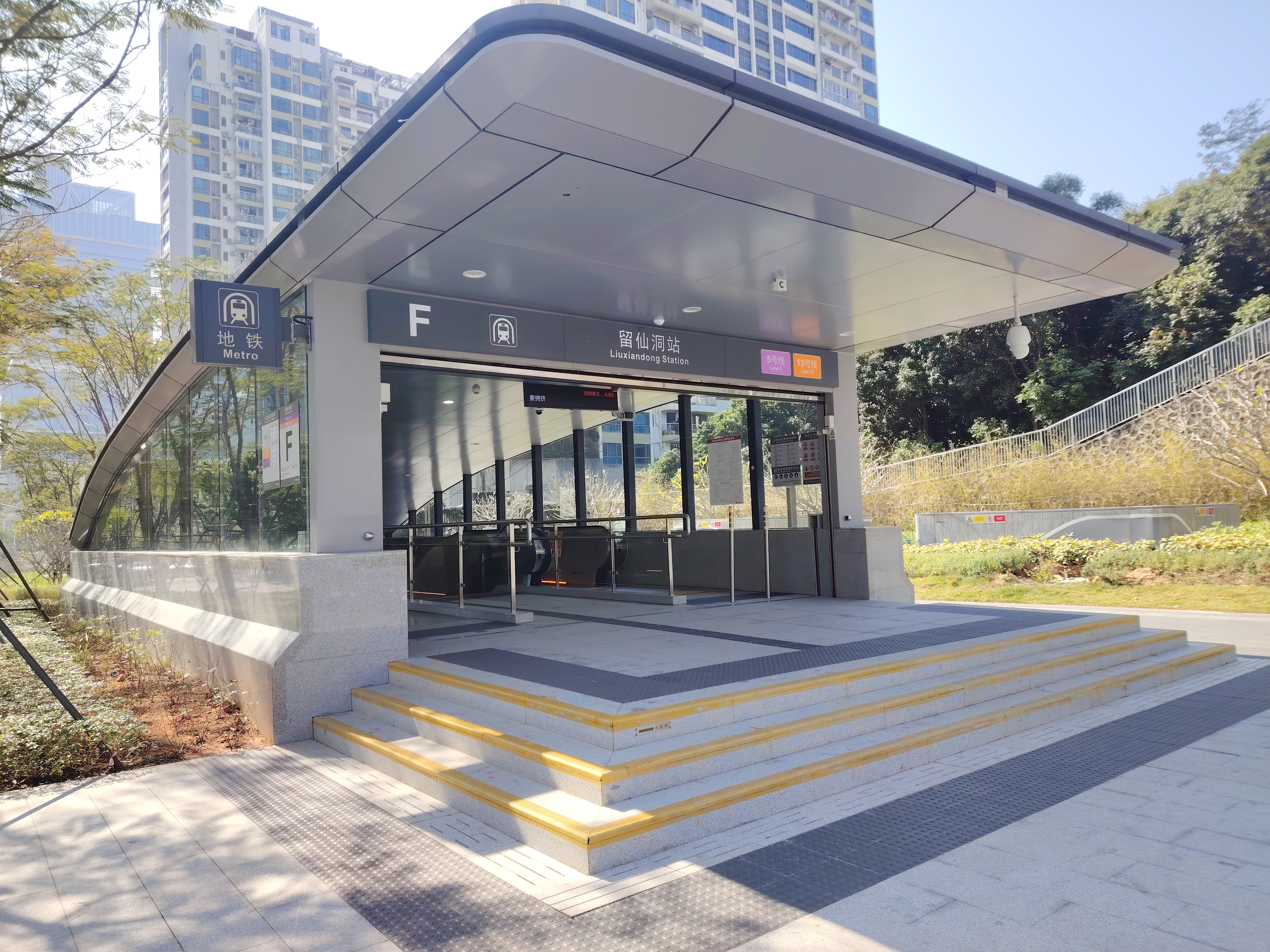
Entrance F

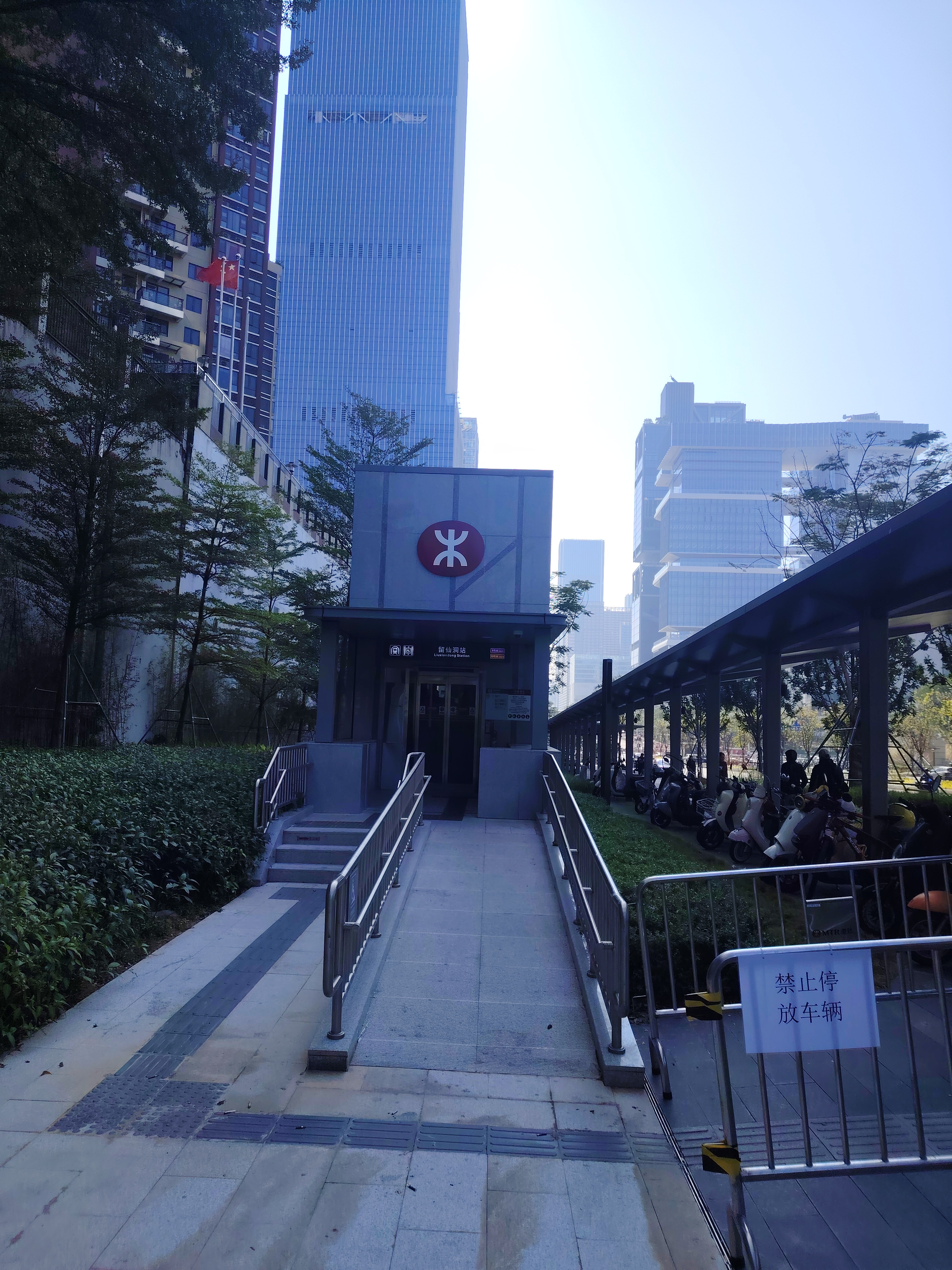
Entrance F (elevator entrance)
