= Xili station =

Metro station in Shenzhen, Guangdong, China

Xili 西丽
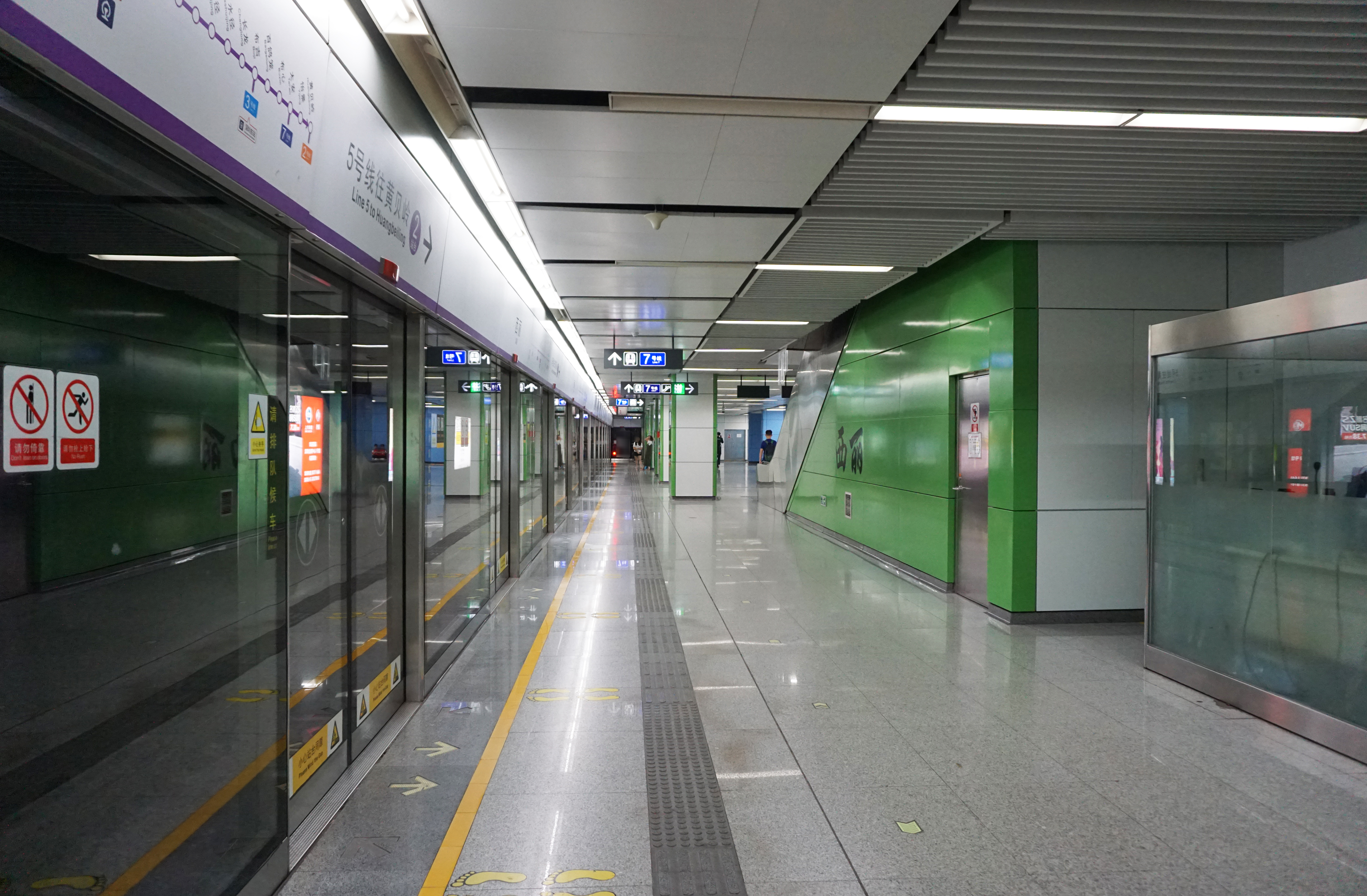
- Line 5 platform (towards Grand Theater)

General information
- Location: Nanshan District, Shenzhen, Guangdong; China
- Coordinates: 22°34′50″N 113°57′16″E
- Operator: SZMC (Shenzhen Metro Group)
- Lines: Line 5; Line 7
- Platforms: 4 (1 island platform and 2 side platforms)
- Tracks: 4

Construction
- Structure type: Underground
- Accessible: Yes

History
- Opened: Line 5: 22 June 2011 (15 years ago); Line 7: 28 October 2016 (9 years ago)

Services
Preceding station	Shenzhen Metro	Following station
University Town towards Grand Theater	Line 5	Liuxiandong towards Chiwan
Xili Lake towards SZU Lihu Campus	Line 7	Chaguang towards Tai'an
Location

Xili station (Chinese: 西丽站; pinyin: Xīlì Zhàn; Jyutping: sai^{1} lai^{6} zaam^{6}) is a station on Lines 5 and 7 of the Shenzhen Metro. Line 5 platforms opened on 22 June 2011 and Line 7 platforms opened on 28 October 2016. This station is an underground station.

== Station layout ==
G	-	Exits A-F
B1F; Concourse	Lobby	Ticket machines, customer service, shops, vending machines, transfer passage between Line 5 and Line 7
B2F; 7 Platforms	Platform	7 towards SZU Lihu Campus (Xili Lake)
B2F; 7 Platforms	Island platform, doors will open on the left
B2F; 7 Platforms	Platform	7 towards Tai'an (Chaguang)
B3F; 5 Platforms	Side platform, doors will open on the right
B3F; 5 Platforms	Platform	5 towards Chiwan (Liuxiandong)
B3F; 5 Platforms	Platform	5 towards Grand Theater (University Town)
B3F; 5 Platforms	Side platform, doors will open on the right

== Exits/entrances ==
This station has 6 Exits/entrances.

Exit	Pictures	Destination
A		South of Liuxian Boulevard, West of Shahe West Road, Southern University of Science and Technology Hospital, Xili People's Court, Xili Sub-district Office, Shigushan Park
B		West of Shahe West Road (S), Shigushan Park, Lilan Yuan
C		East of Shahe West Road (S), Zhongguan Xijun Garden, Xili People's Court, Zhongguan Building, Lixin Building, Jianxin Building,
D		East of Shahe West Road (N), Xili Primary School, Changfeng Building, Nanguo Licheng, Lihuang Building, Jiuxiangling Cun
E		West of Shahe West Road (N), West of Tongsha Road, Shenzhen Polytechnic University Xili Campus, Dingxin Building, Xinwei Community Workstation, Lixin Garden
F		North of Liuxian Boulevard, Shahe West Road, Xinweicun Bus Stop, Dingxin Building, Xinweicun, Xili Rainbow Department Store,

== Gallery ==
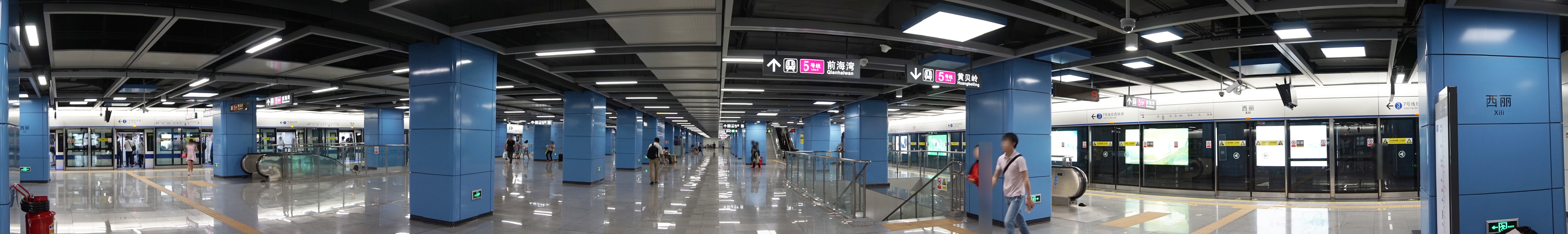
Line 7 Platforms Panorama
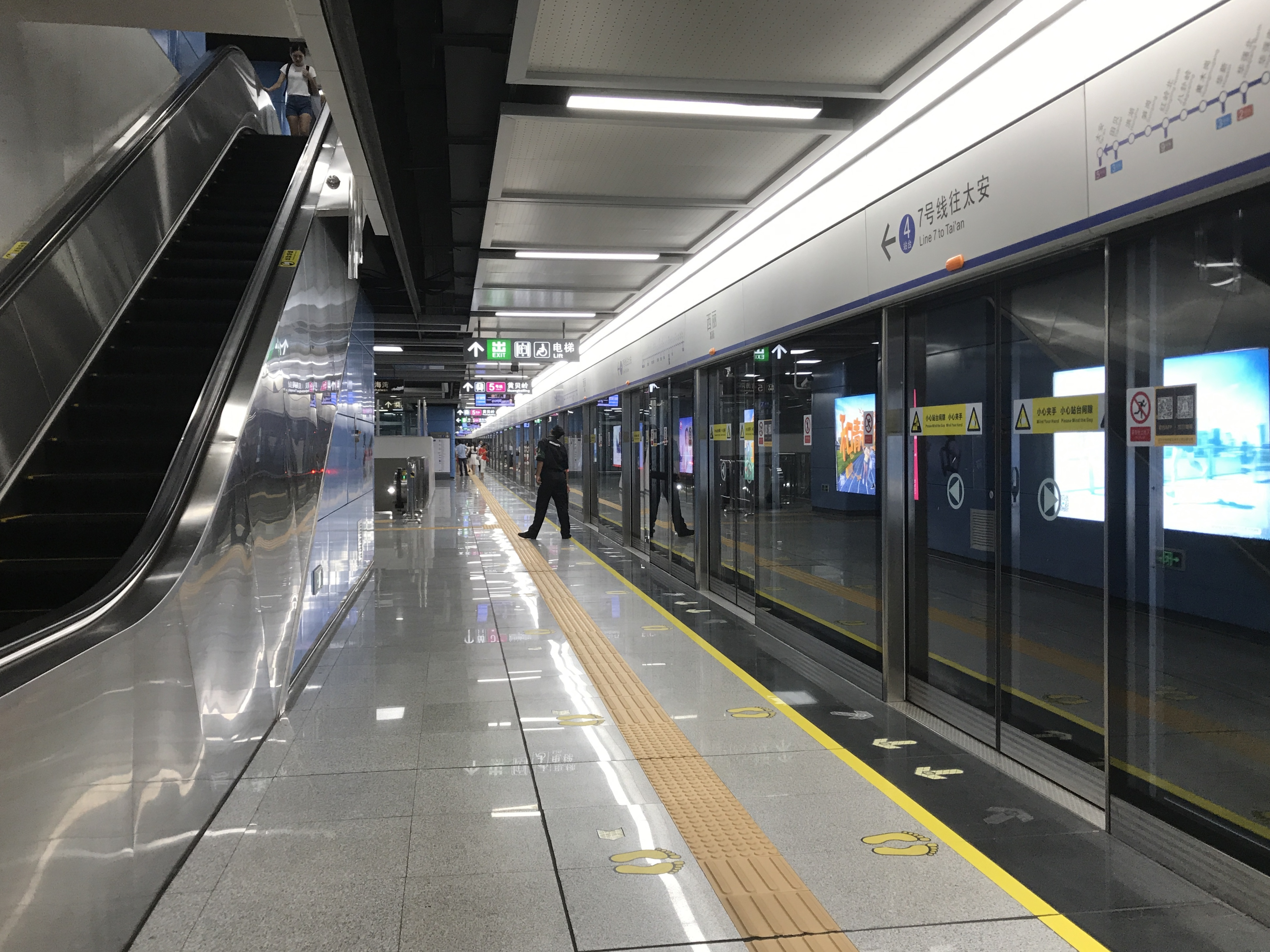
Line 7 Platform (2017)

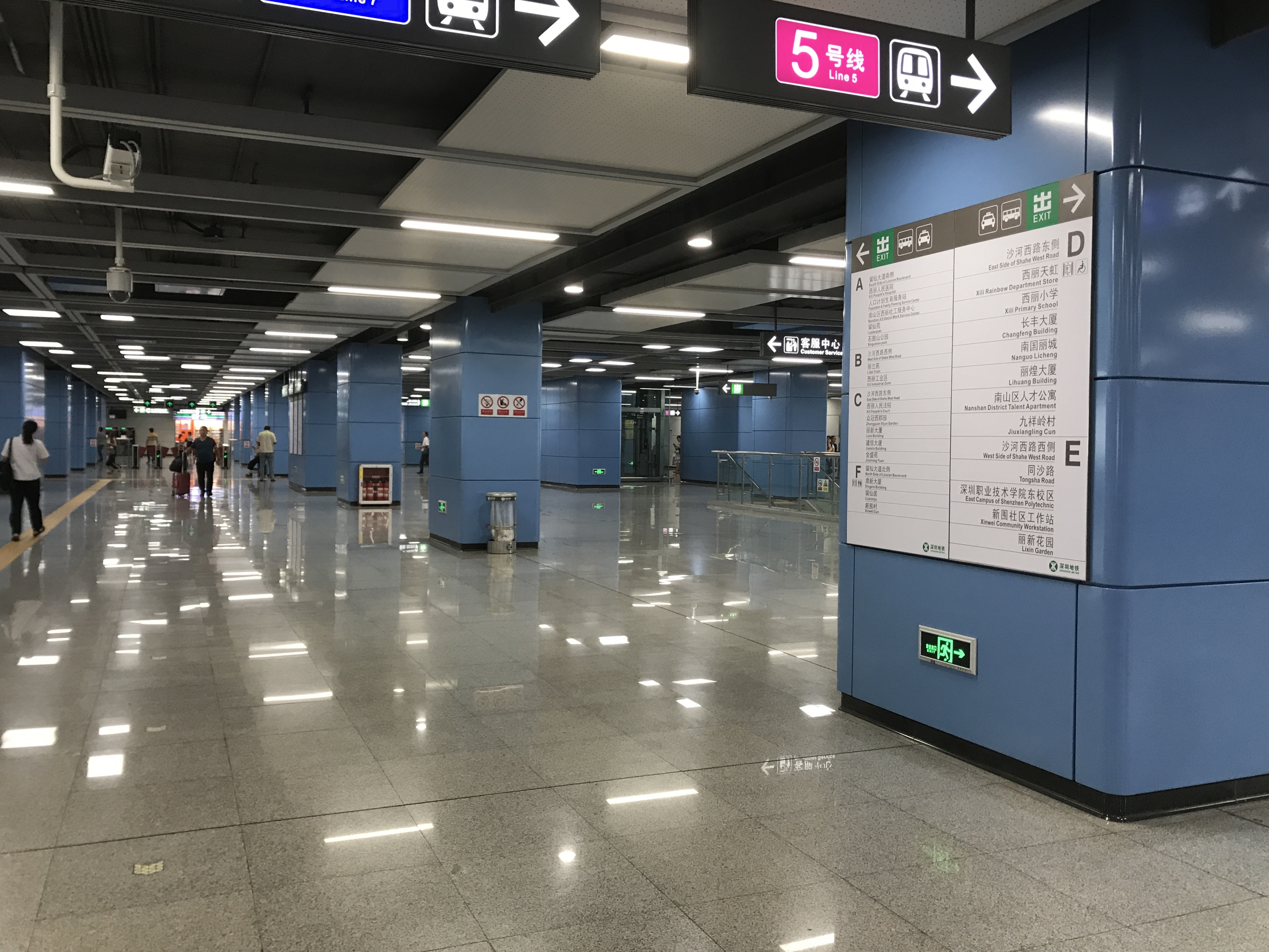
Concourse

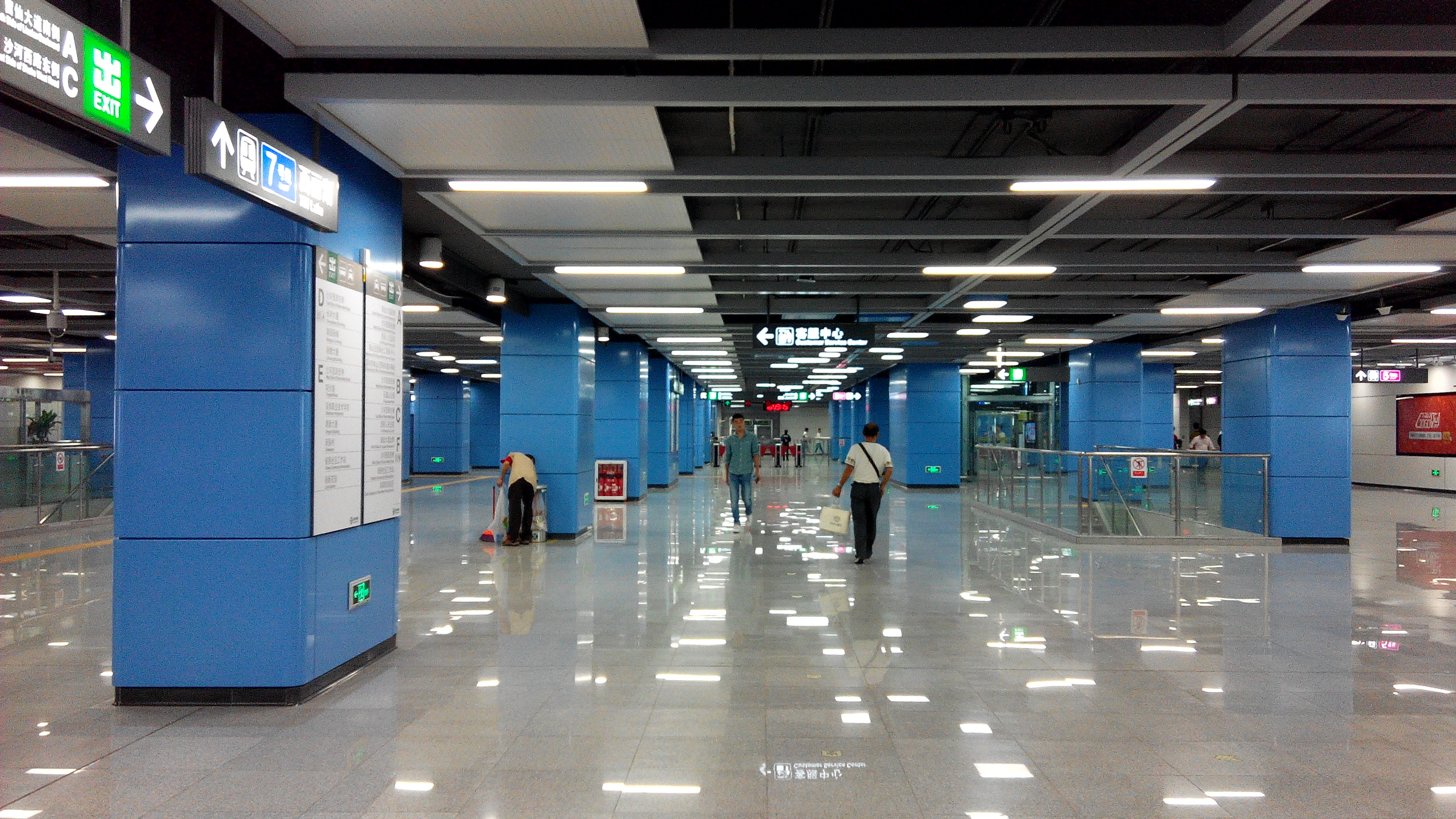
Concourse

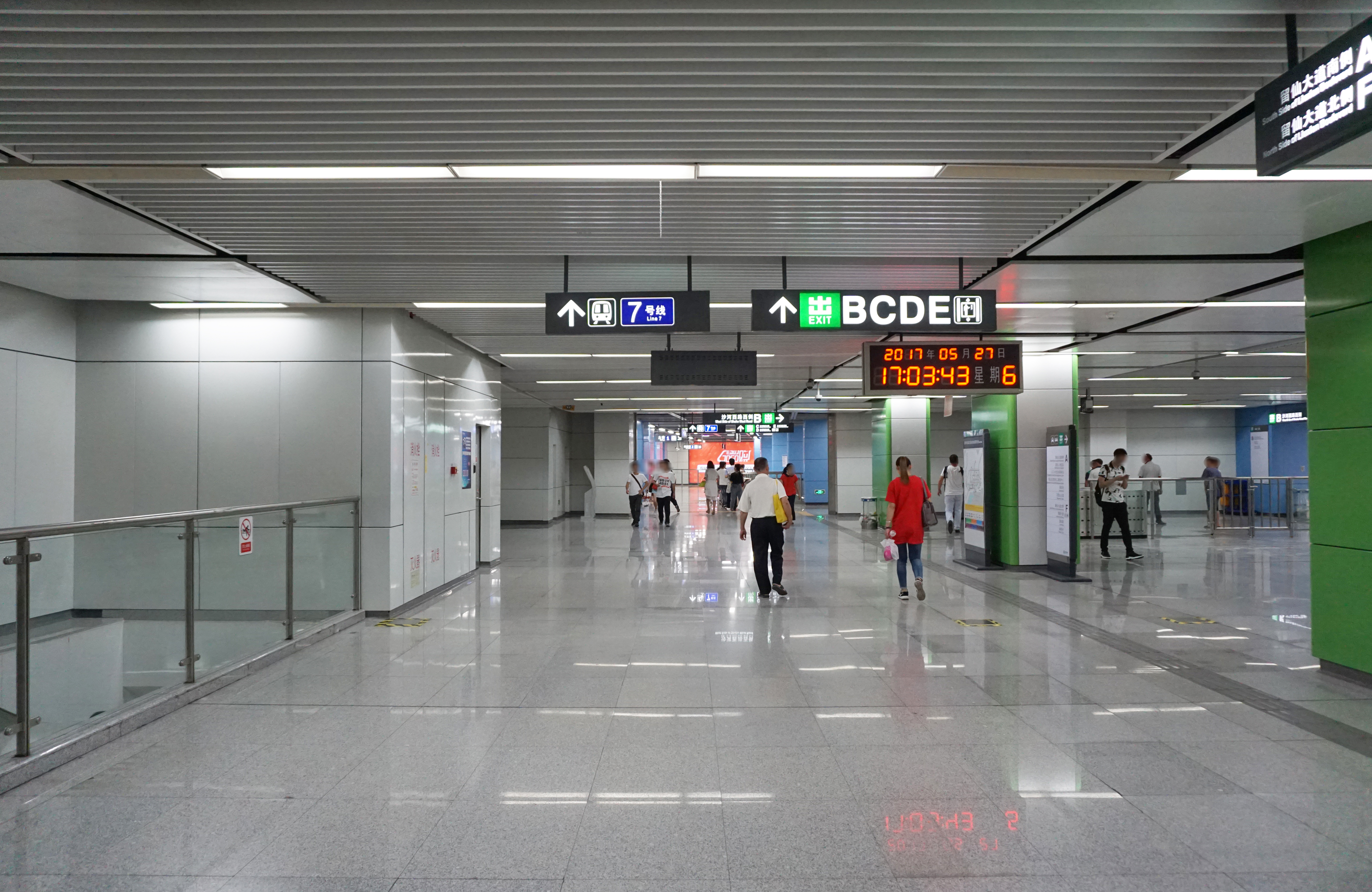
Concourse

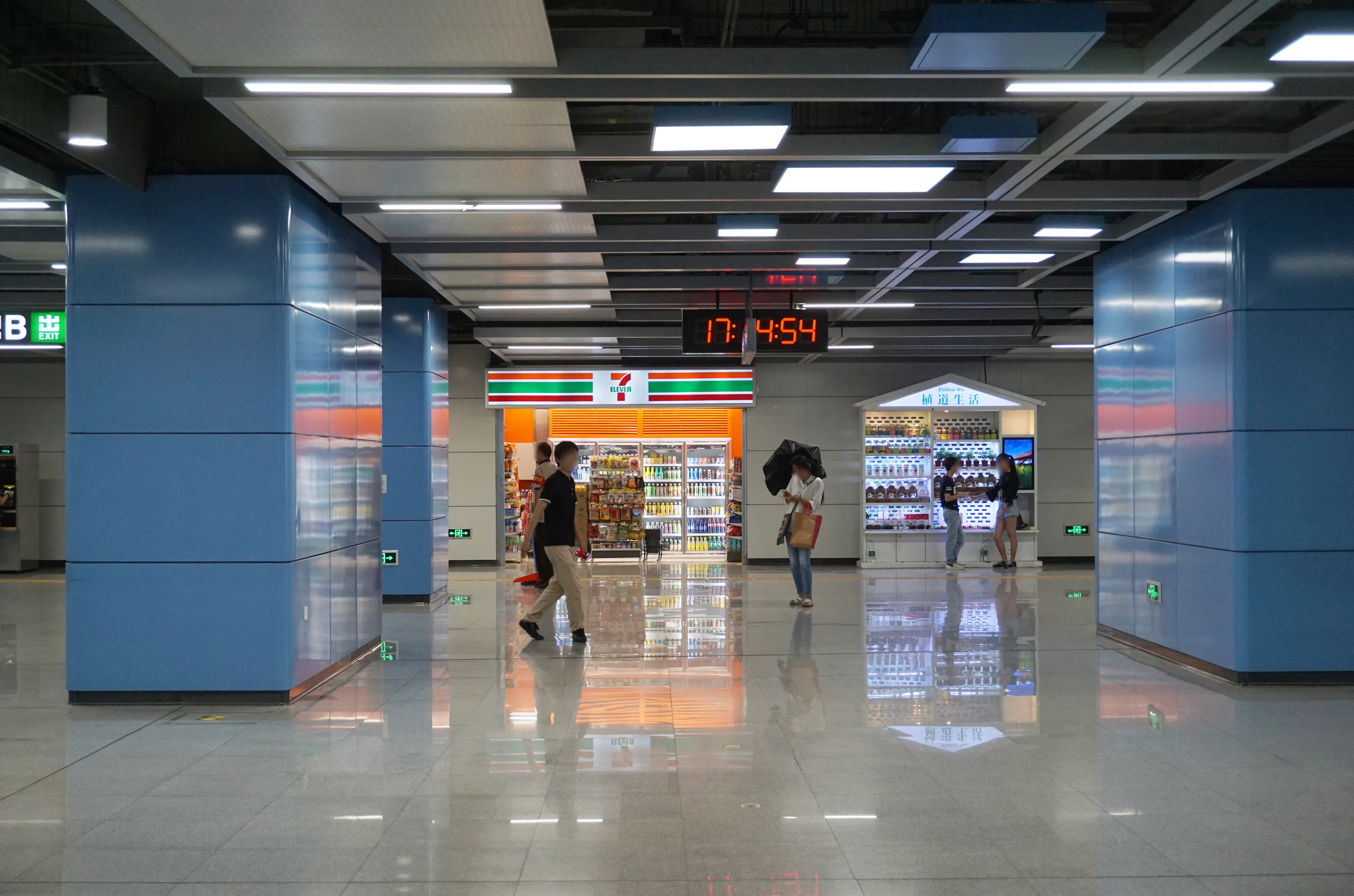
Concourse with store

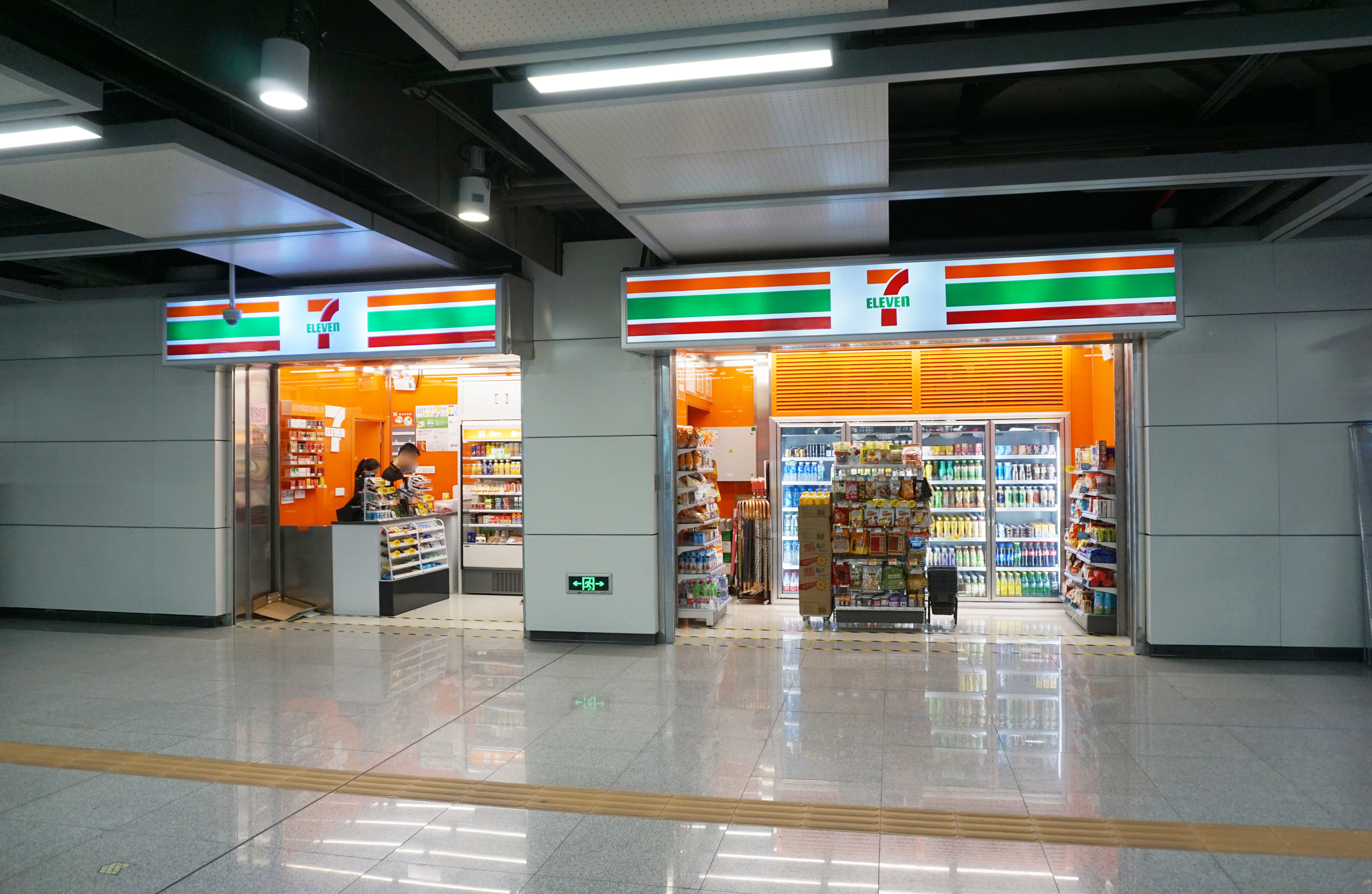
7-Eleven store at Lobby
