= University Town station (Shenzhen Metro) =

Metro station in Shenzhen, China

Coordinates: 22°34′55″N 113°57′54″E

University Town 大学城
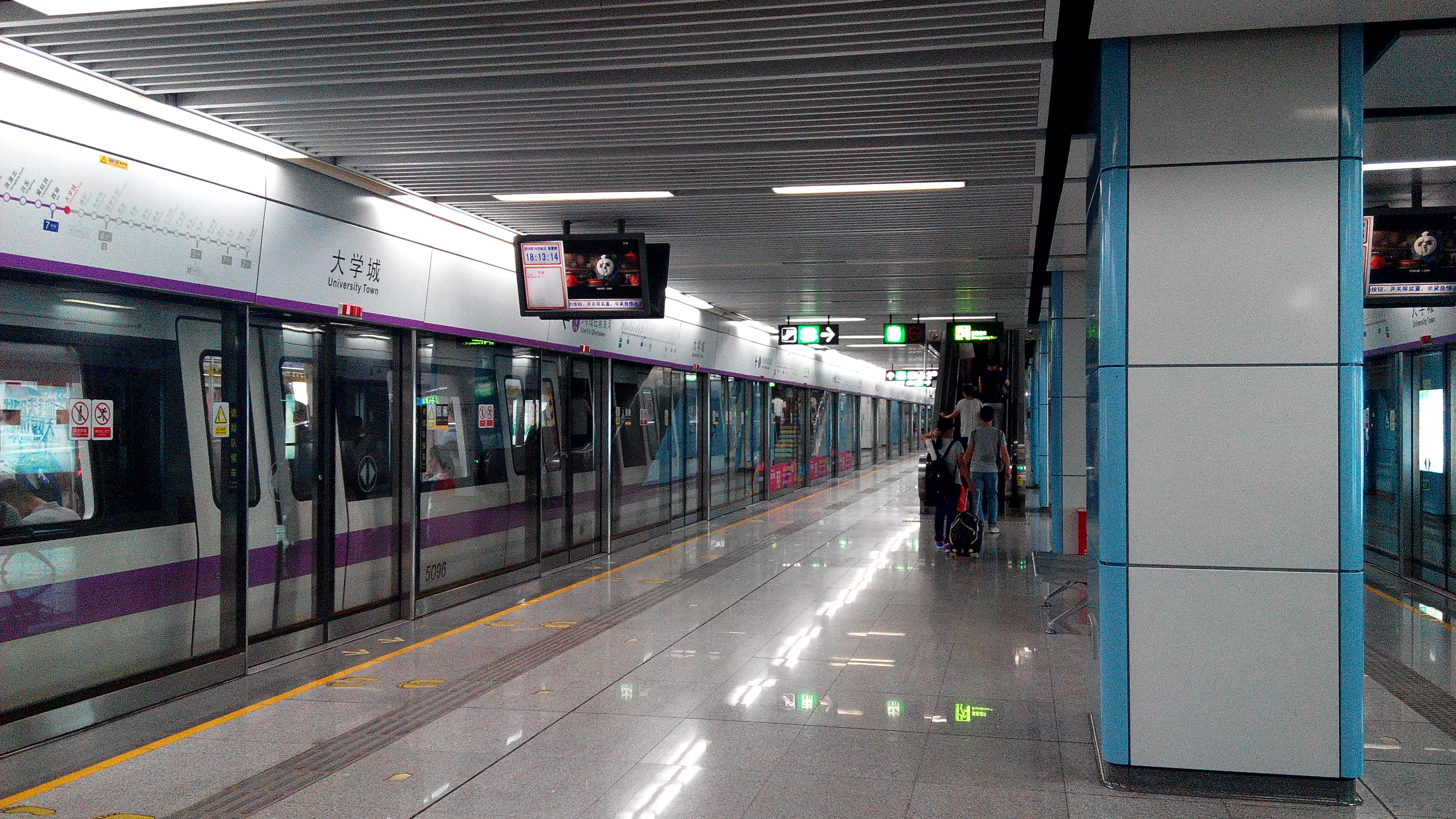
- Platform (2016)

General information
- Location: Nanshan District, Shenzhen, Guangdong; China
- Operated by: SZMC (Shenzhen Metro Group)
- Line: Line 5

History
- Opened: 22 June 2011

Services
Preceding station	Shenzhen Metro	Following station
Tanglang towards Grand Theater	Line 5	Xili towards Chiwan
Location

University Town station
- Simplified Chinese: 大学城站
- Traditional Chinese: 大學城站
Transcriptions
Yue: Cantonese
- Jyutping: daai6 hok6 sing4 zaam6

University Town station (simplified Chinese: 大学城站; traditional Chinese: 大學城站; pinyin: Dàxuéchéng Zhàn; Jyutping: daai^{6} hok^{6} sing^{4} zaam^{6}) is a station on Line 5 of the Shenzhen Metro. It opened on 22 June 2011. The station is an underground station and serves the University Town of Shenzhen.

== Station layout ==
G	-	Exit
B1F; Concourse	Lobby	Customer service, shops, vending machines, ATMs
B2F; Platforms	Platform 1	← 5 towards Chiwan (Xili)
B2F; Platforms	Island platform, doors will open on the left, right
B2F; Platforms	Platform 2	← 5 towards Chiwan (Xili) → 5 towards Grand Theater (Tanglang) →
B2F; Platforms	Platform 3	→ 5 towards Grand Theater (Tanglang) →
B2F; Platforms	Side platform, doors will open on the right

== Exits ==
Exit	Destination
Exit A	Reserved Exit
Exit B	South of Liuxian Boulevard, North of Honghua North Road, Shenzhen University Town Business Park (Area B), South Area of Zhongguan Honghualing Industry
Exit C	North of Liuxian Boulevard (E), East of Lishan Road, Pingshancun, Harbin Institute of Technology Shenzhen Campus, Sheraton Shenzhen Nanshan
Exit D	North of Liuxian Boulevard (W), West of Lishan Road, Yitian Holiday Village

== Gallery ==
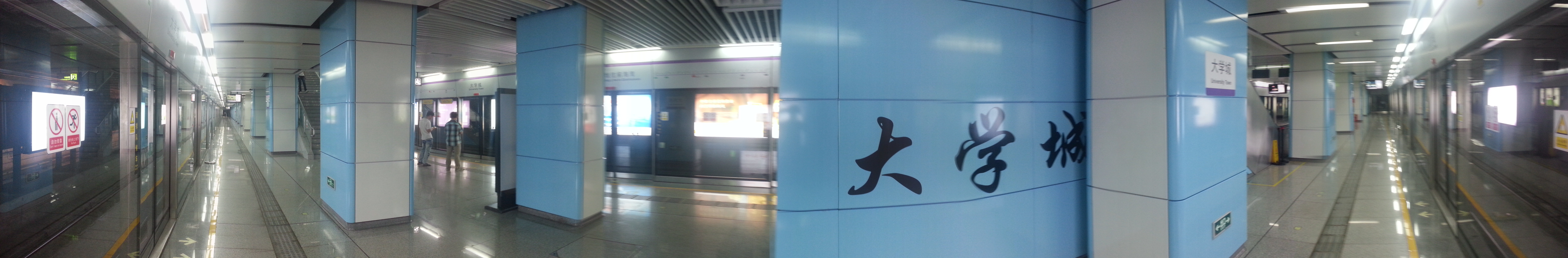
Platform panorama

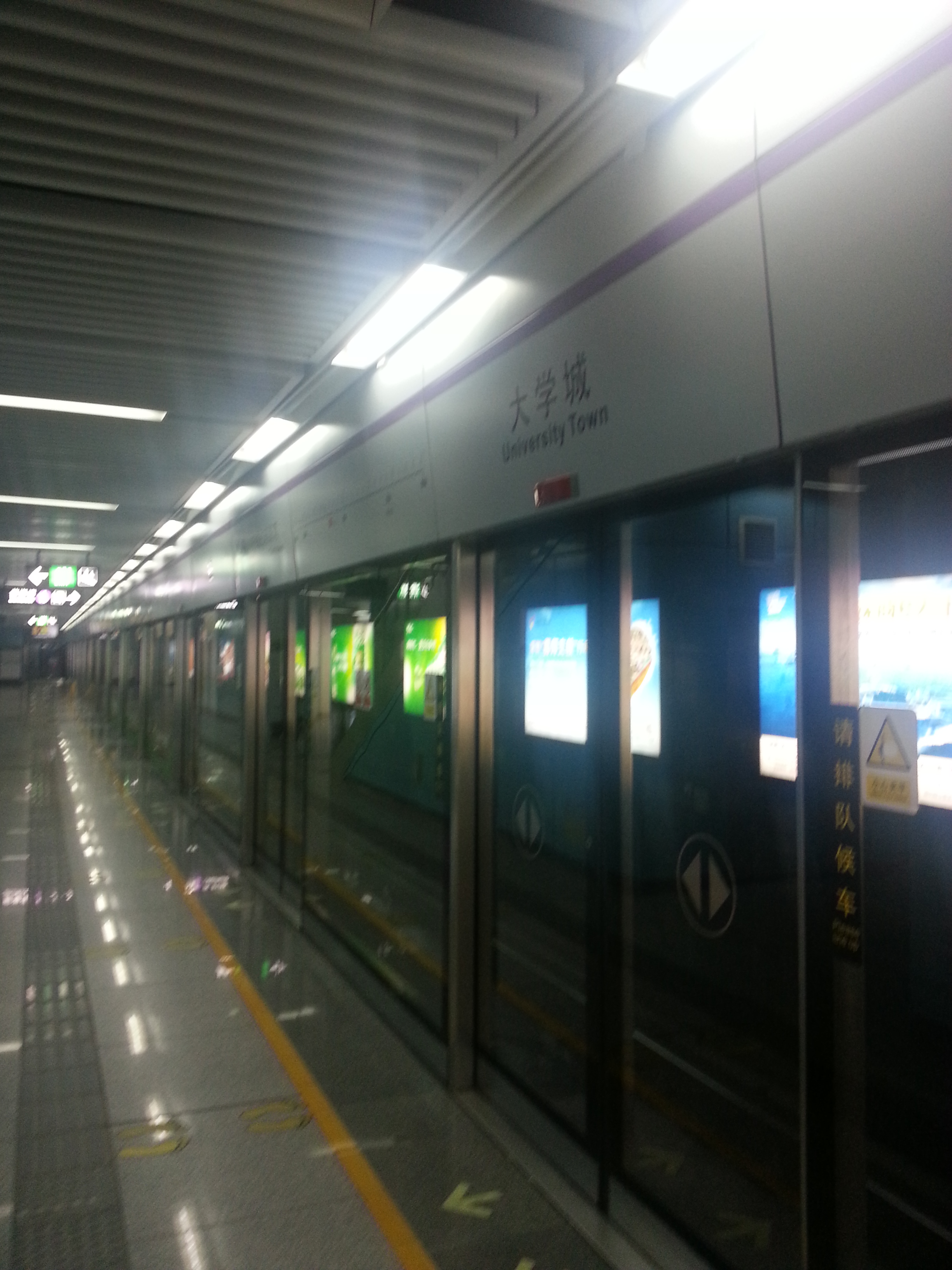
Platform (2013)

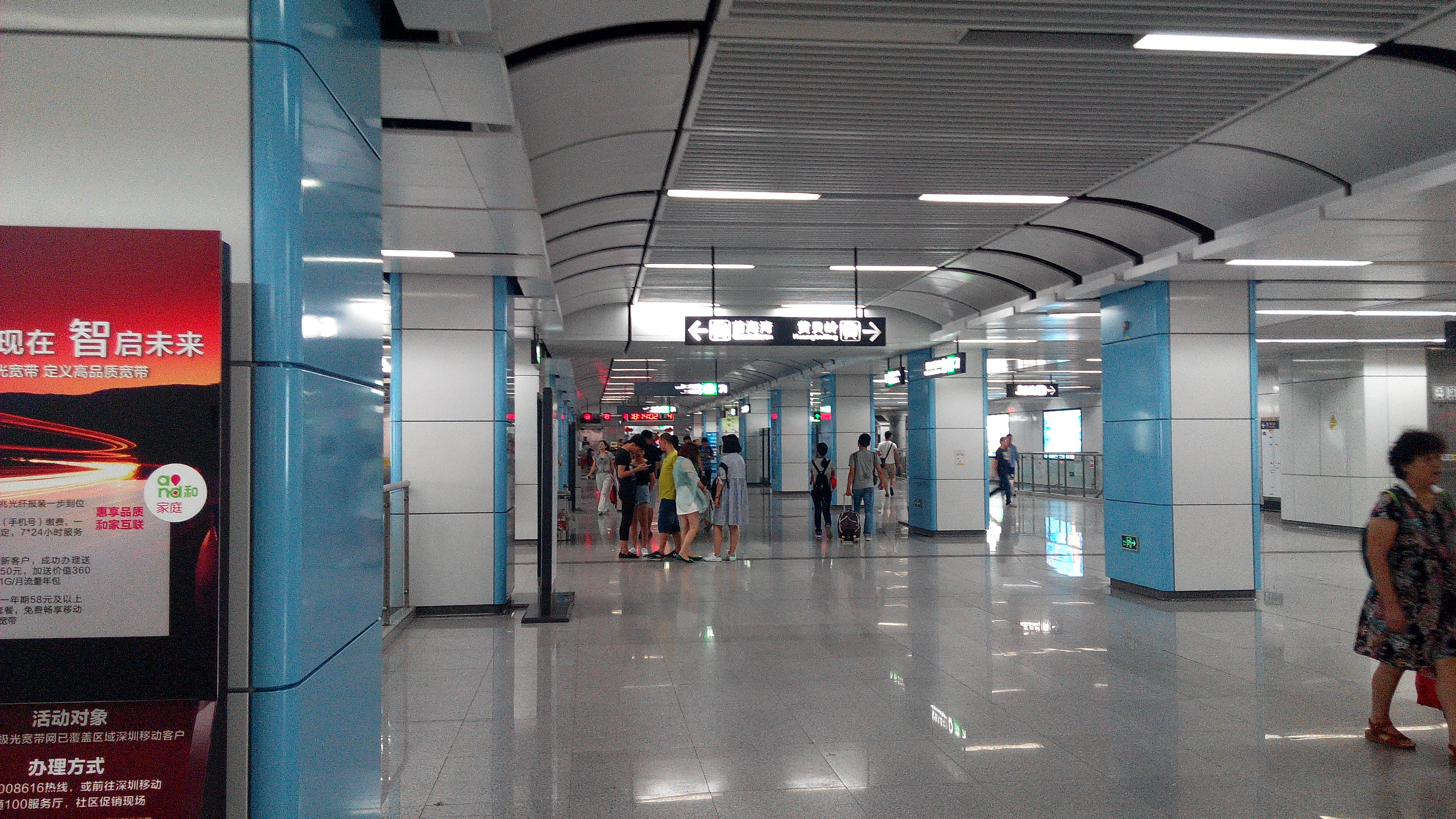
Concourse

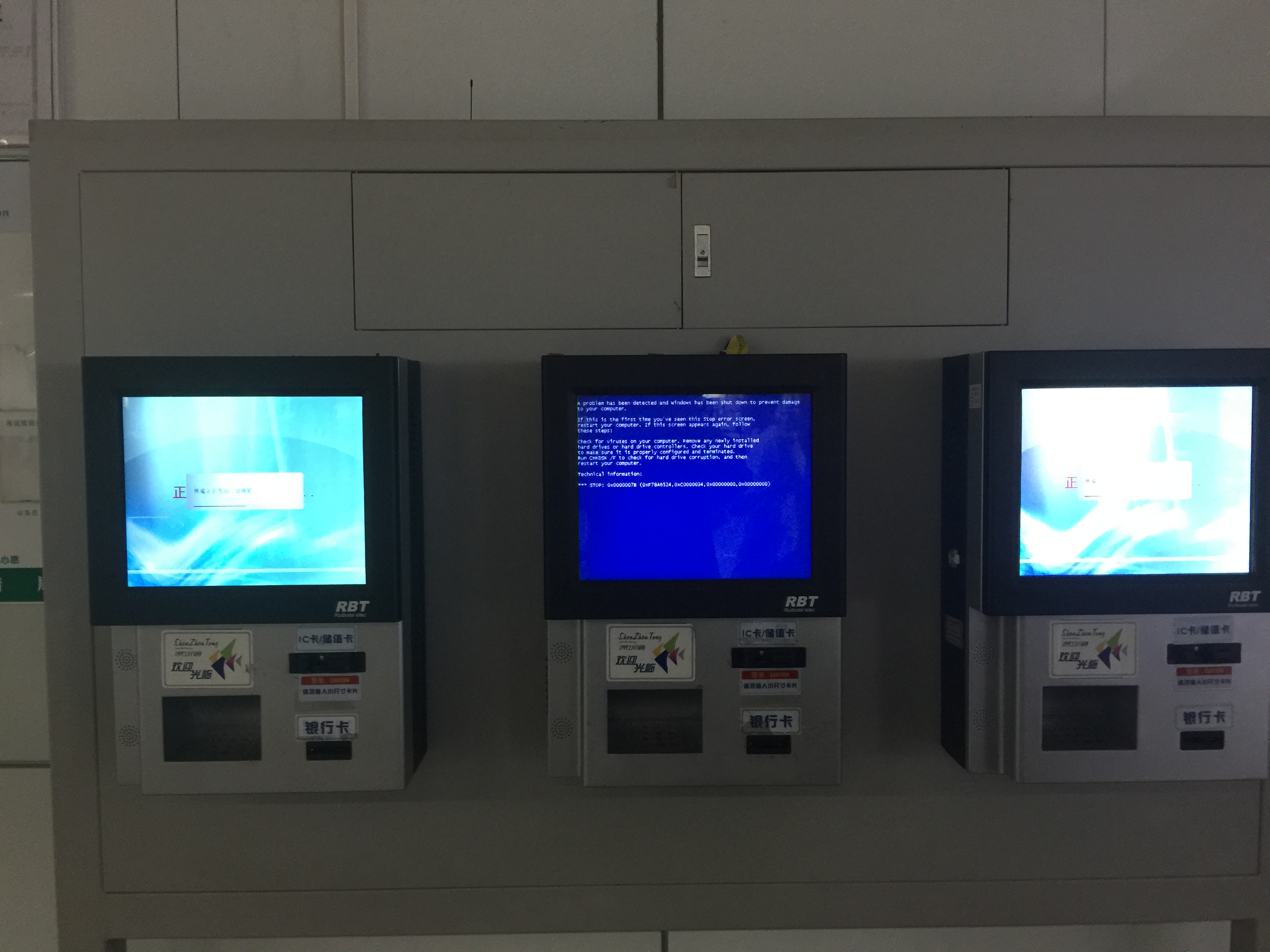
Blue Screen of Death on Ticket Machine
