= Tanglang station =

Metro station in Shenzhen, Guangdong, China

Coordinates: 22°35′24″N 114°0′0″E

Tanglang 塘朗
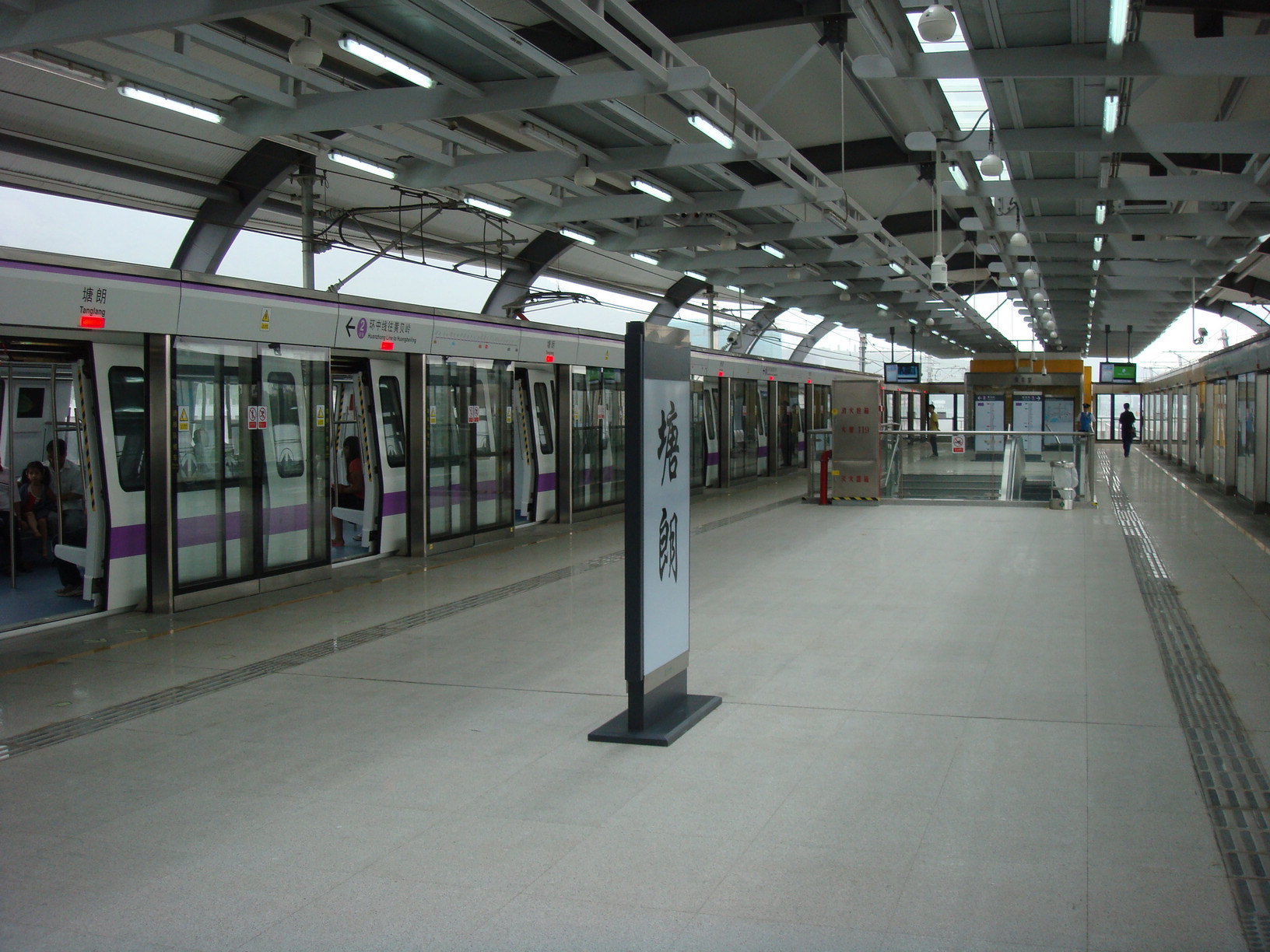
- Platforms

General information
- Location: Bao'an District, Shenzhen, Guangdong; China
- Operated by: SZMC (Shenzhen Metro Group)
- Line: Line 5

History
- Opened: 22 June 2011

Services
Preceding station	Shenzhen Metro	Following station
Changlingpi towards Grand Theater	Line 5	University Town towards Chiwan
Location

Tanglang station
- Chinese: 塘朗站
Transcriptions
Standard Mandarin
- Hanyu Pinyin: Tánglǎng Zhàn
Yue: Cantonese
- Jyutping: tong4 long5 zaam6

Tanglang station (Chinese: 塘朗站; pinyin: Tánglǎng Zhàn; Jyutping: tong^{4} long^{5} zaam^{6}) is station on Line 5 of the Shenzhen Metro. It opened on 22 June 2011. This station is an elevated station.

Tanglang is marked on the Shenzhen Metro map as the station for the Southern University of Science and Technology (formerly South University of Science and Technology of China in English).

== Station layout ==
3F; Platforms	Platform 1	← 5 towards Chiwan (University Town)
3F; Platforms	Island platform, doors will open on the left
3F; Platforms	Platform 2	→ 5 towards Grand Theater (Changlingpi) →
2F; Concourse	Lobby	Customer Service, Shops, Vending machines, ATMs
G	-	Exit

== Exits ==
Exit	Destination
Exit A	Liuxian Boulevard (S), Shenzhen Metro Tanglang Depot
Exit C	Liuxian Boulevard (N), Tangchang Road, Bus Terminal of Fuguangcun, Southern University of Science and Technology of China, University Town of Shenzhen
Exit D	Liuxian Boulevard (S), Tangchang Road, Tanglang Village, University Town of Shenzhen, Shenzhen Institutes of Advanced Technology, China Academy of Science, Tanglang Primary School, Tanglang Building
