= Changlingpi station =

Metro station in Shenzhen, Guangdong, China

Coordinates: 22°35′57″N 114°0′40″E

Changlingpi 长岭陂
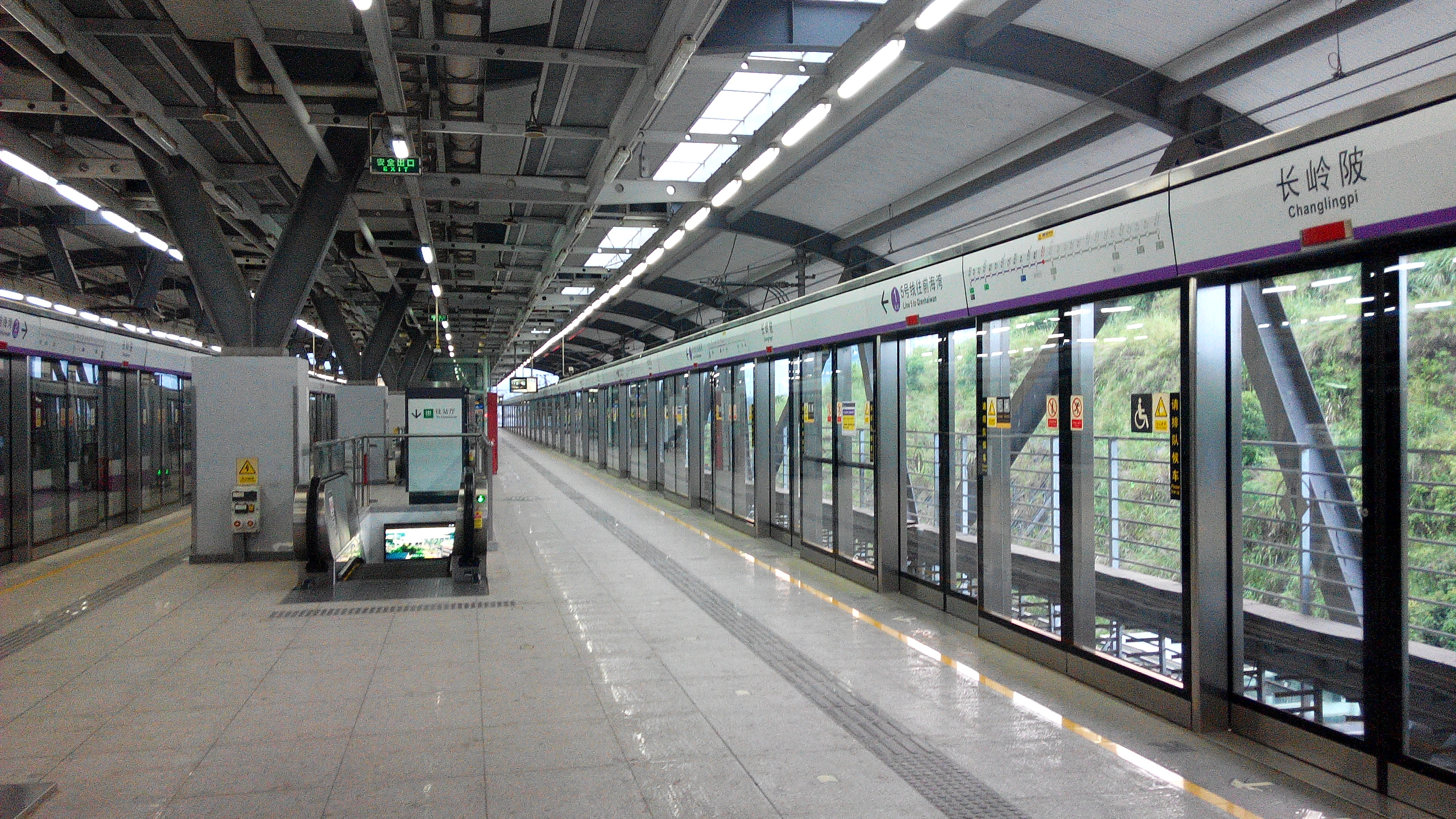
- Interior of Changlingpi Station

General information
- Location: Nanshan District, Shenzhen, Guangdong; China
- Operator: SZMC (Shenzhen Metro Group)
- Line: Line 5

History
- Opened: 22 June 2011

Services
Preceding station	Shenzhen Metro	Following station
Shenzhen North towards Grand Theater	Line 5	Tanglang towards Chiwan
Track layout
Location

Changlingpi station
- Simplified Chinese: 长岭陂站
- Traditional Chinese: 長嶺陂站
Transcriptions
Standard Mandarin
- Hanyu Pinyin: Chánglǐngpí Zhàn
Yue: Cantonese
- Jyutping: coeng4 ling5 bei1 zaam6

Changlingpi station (Chinese: 长岭陂站; pinyin: Chánglǐngpí Zhàn; Jyutping: coeng^{4} ling^{5} bei^{1} zaam^{6}) is a metro station of Shenzhen Metro Line 5. It opened on 22 June 2011. This station is an elevated station.

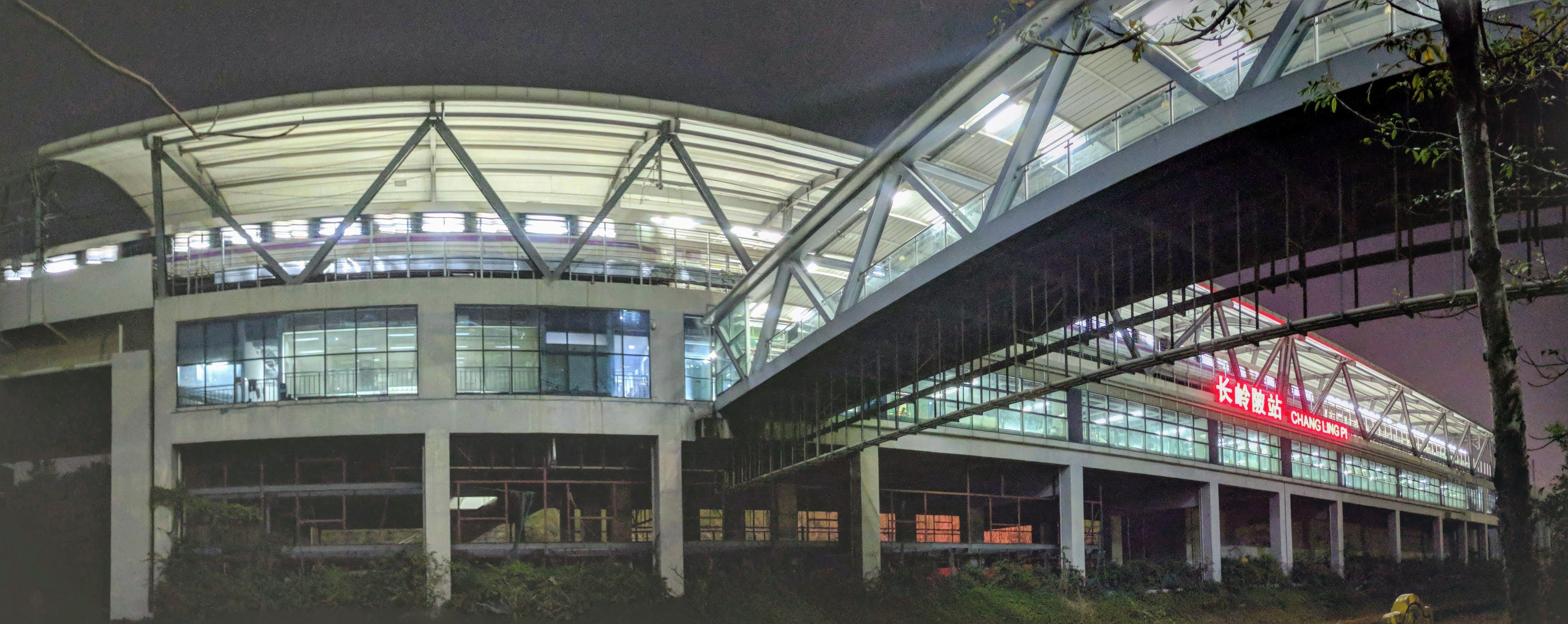
PANO of Night Sight of SZMC Changlingpi Station

== Station layout ==
3F; Platforms	Platform 1	← 5 towards Chiwan (Tanglang)
3F; Platforms	Island platform, doors will open on the left
3F; Platforms	Platform 2 ↑ Platform 3 ↓	→ No regular service
3F; Platforms	Island platform, doors will open on the left
3F; Platforms	Platform 4	5 towards Grand Theater (Shenzhen North) →
2F; Concourse	Lobby	Customer Service, Shops, Vending machines, Automatic ticket vending
G	-	Exit

== Exits ==
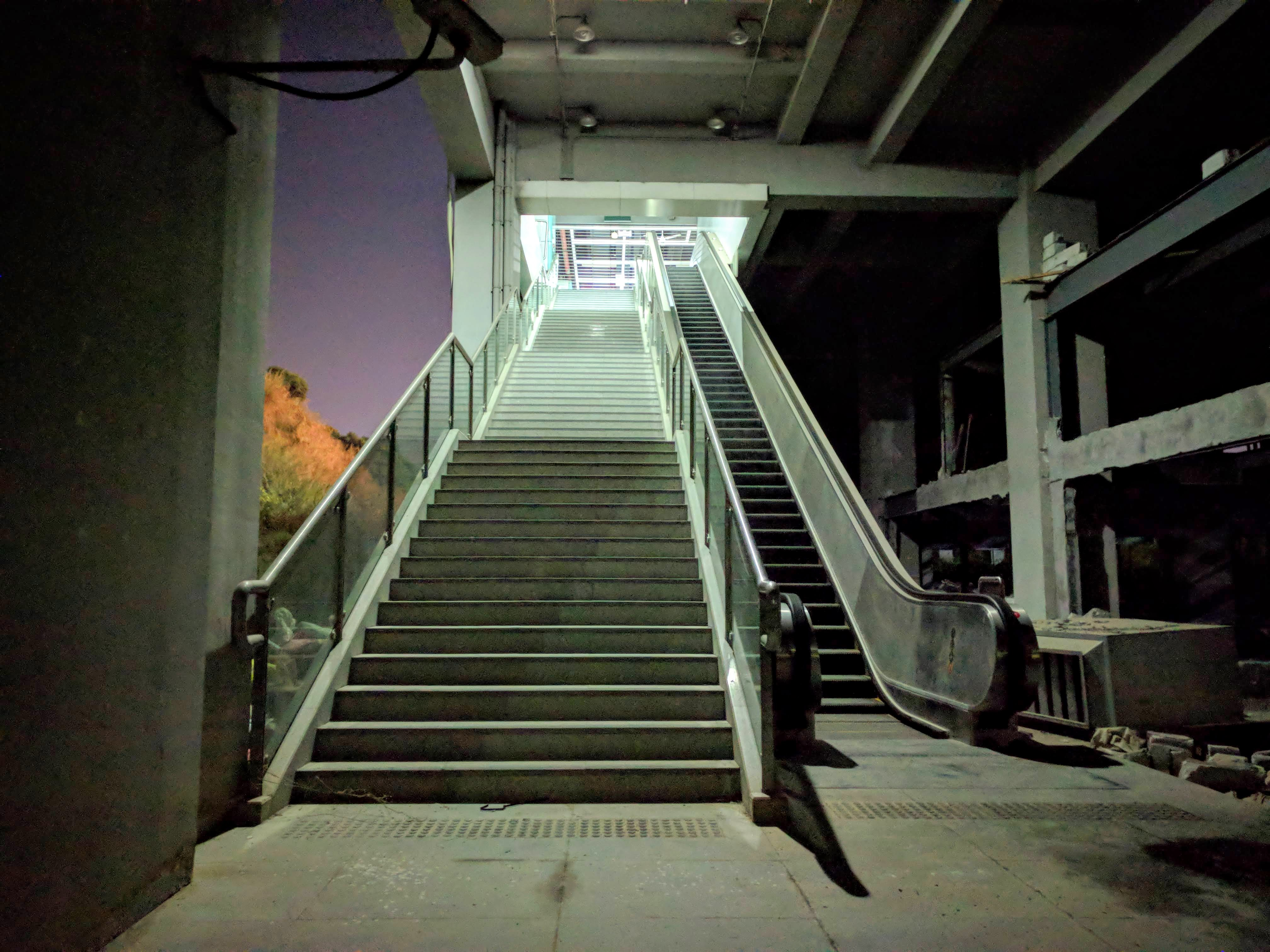
Exit D of Changlingpi Station (Abandoned)

Exit		Destination
Exit A	A1	Liuxian Boulevard (S), Changyuancun, Changyuan Neighborhood Committee, Changyuan Community Health Service Center of Xili Hospital
Exit A	A2	Liuxian Boulevard (E)
Exit B		Reserved Exit
Exit C		Liuxian Boulevard (N), Changlingpi Reservoir
Exit D		Liuxian Boulevard (S)
