= Shenzhen Polytechnic University =

Municipal public vocational university in Shenzhen, Guangdong, China

Coordinates: 22°35′29″N 113°56′47″E

- 深圳职业技术大学
- Motto: 敬业、创新、务实、奉献、协作
- Type: Public vocational university
- Established: 1993; 33 years ago
- President: Liu Hongyi
- Faculty: 1,846
- Location: Shenzhen, Guangdong, China
- Website: www.szpu.edu.cn

Chinese name
- Simplified Chinese: 深圳职业技术大学
- Traditional Chinese: 深圳職業技術大學
Transcriptions
Standard Mandarin
- Hanyu Pinyin: Shēnzhèn Zhíyè Jìshù Dàxué
Yue: Cantonese
- Jyutping: sam1 zan3 zik1 jip6 gei6 seot6 daai6 hok6

Shenzhen Polytechnic University (SZPU; 深圳职业技术大学) is a municipal public vocational university in Nanshan, Shenzhen, Guangdong, China. The school is owned by the City of Shenzhen, and funded by the municipal government.
