= Linhai station =

Metro station in Shenzhen, China

Coordinates: 22°32′38″N 113°53′21″E

Linhai 临海
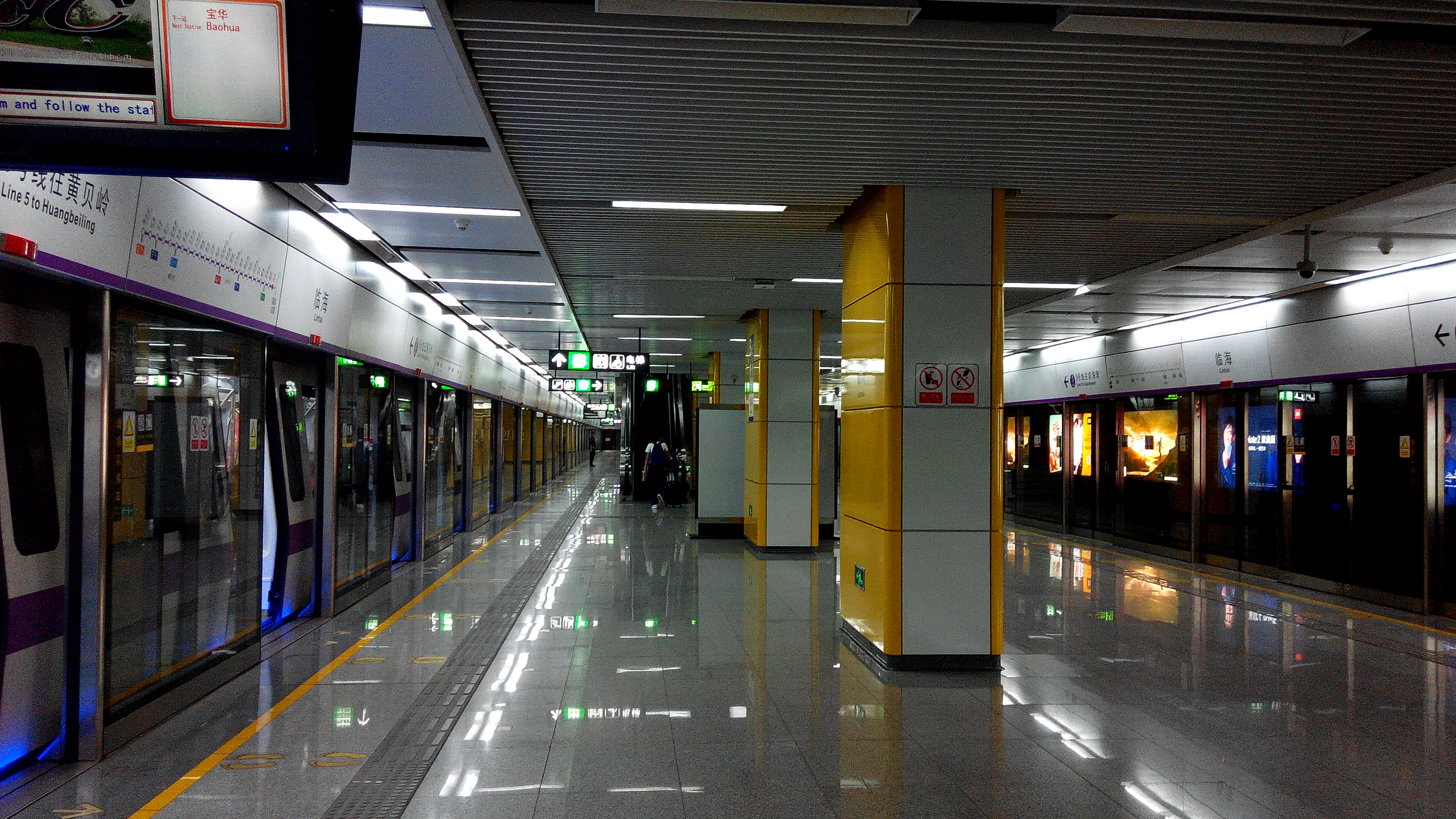

General information
- Location: Bao'an District, Shenzhen, Guangdong; China
- Operator: SZMC (Shenzhen Metro Group)
- Line: Line 5
- Platforms: 2 (1 island platform)
- Tracks: 2

Construction
- Structure type: Underground
- Accessible: Yes

History
- Opened: 22 June 2011

Services
| Preceding station | Shenzhen Metro | Following station |
|---|---|---|
| Baohua towards Grand Theater | Line 5 | Qianhaiwan towards Chiwan |
Location

Linhai station (Chinese: 临海站; pinyin: Línhǎi Zhàn; Jyutping: lam^{4} hoi^{2} zaam^{6}) is a station of Line 5 of the Shenzhen Metro It opened on 22 June 2011. This station is an underground station.

== Station layout ==
| G | - | Exit |
| B1F; Concourse | Lobby | Customer Service, Shops, Vending machines, ATMs |
| B2F; Platforms | Platform 1 | ← 5 towards Chiwan (Qianhaiwan) |
| B2F; Platforms | Island platform, doors will open on the left |
| B2F; Platforms | Platform 2 | → 5 towards Grand Theater (Baohua) → |

== Exits ==
| Exit | | Destination |
|---|---|---|
| Exit A | | Jia'an Road, Haitian Road, Royal Bay |
| Exit B | B1 | Linhai Road (N) |
| Exit B | B2 | Linhai Road (S), OCT Oh Bay, Bay Glory |
