= Fanshen station =

Metro station in Shenzhen, China

Coordinates: 22°33′38″N 113°53′38″E

Fanshen 翻身
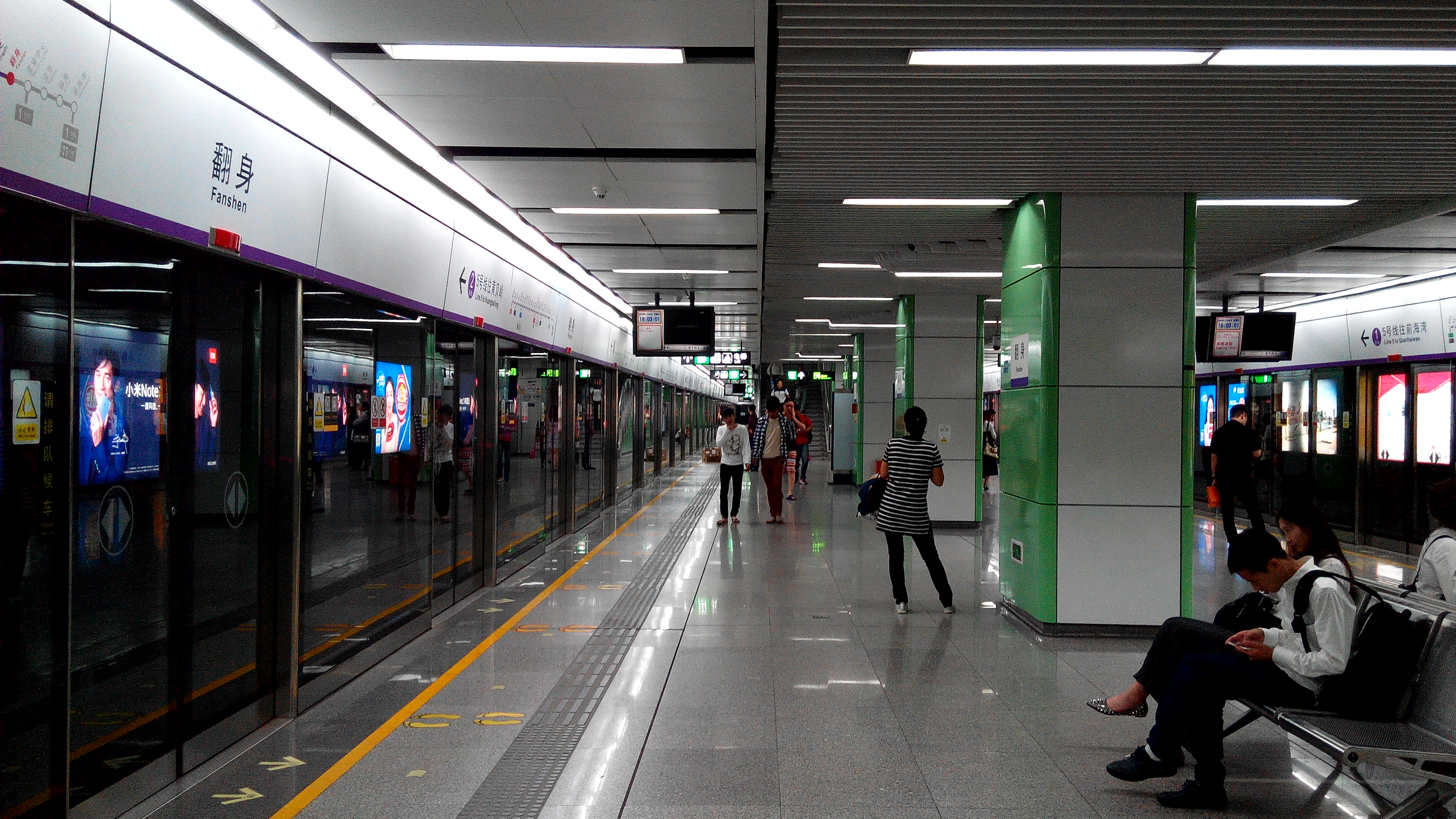

General information
- Location: Bao'an District, Shenzhen, Guangdong; China
- Operated by: SZMC (Shenzhen Metro Group)
- Line: Line 5

History
- Opened: 22 June 2011

Services
Preceding station	Shenzhen Metro	Following station
Lingzhi towards Grand Theater	Line 5	Bao'an Center towards Chiwan
Location

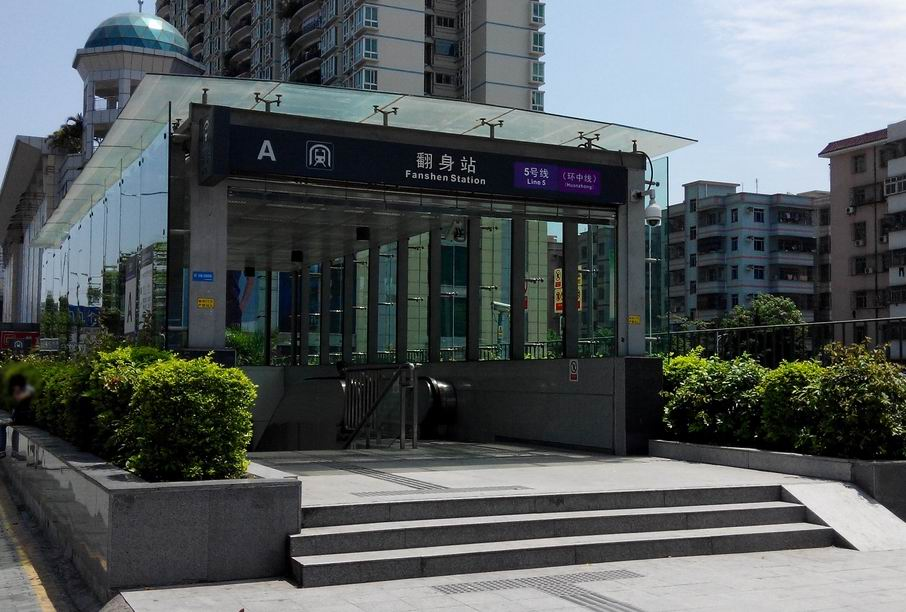
Exit A

Fanshen station (Chinese: 翻身站; pinyin: Fānshēn Zhàn; Jyutping: faan^{1} san^{1} zaam^{6}) is an underground metro station on Line 5 of the Shenzhen Metro. It opened on 22 June 2011. The station is located at the intersection of Chuangye 1st Road and Fanshen Road in Bao'an District.
