= Bao'an station (Shenzhen Metro) =

Metro station in Shenzhen, Guangdong, China

Coordinates: 22.5577°N 113.87553°E

Bao'an 寶安
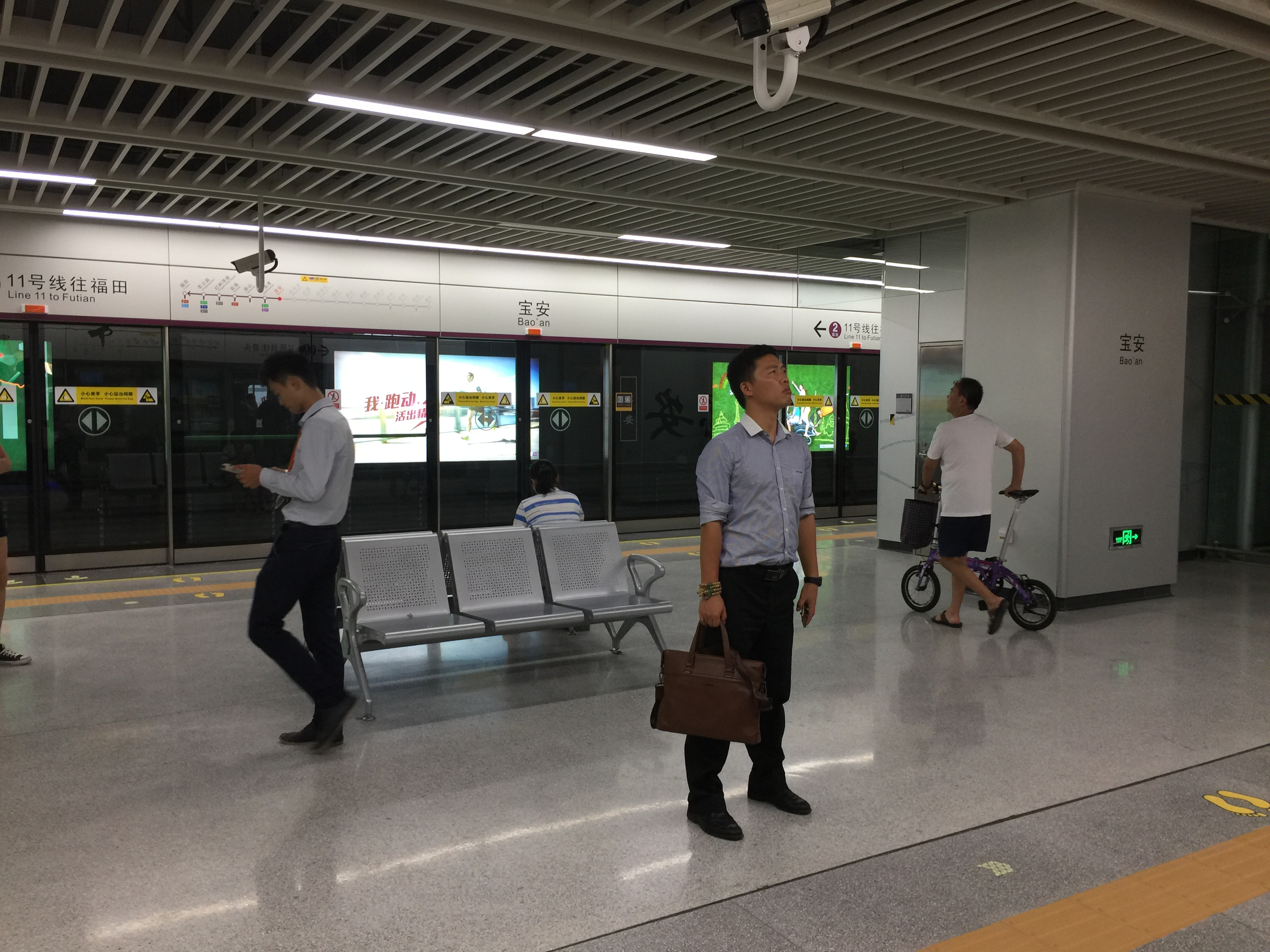

General information
- Location: Bao'an District, Shenzhen; Guangdong; China
- Operated by: SZMC (Shenzhen Metro Group)
- Line: Line 11
- Platforms: 2 (1 island platform)
- Tracks: 2

Construction
- Structure type: Underground
- Accessible: Yes

History
- Opened: 28 June 2016 (9 years ago)

Services
Preceding station	Shenzhen Metro	Following station
Bihaiwan towards Bitou	Line 11	Qianhaiwan towards Hongling South
Location

Bao'an station (simplified Chinese: 宝安站; traditional Chinese: 寶安站; Jyutping: Bou2 On1 Zaam6) is a station on Line 11 of the Shenzhen Metro. It opened on 28 June 2016. This station was constructed upon the request by the Bao'an district government.

== Station layout ==
G	-	Exits A-D
B1F; Concourse	Lobby	Ticket Machines, Customer Service, Shops, Vending Machines
B2F; Platforms	Platform	11 towards Bitou (Bihaiwan)
B2F; Platforms	Island platform, doors will open on the left
B2F; Platforms	Platform	11 towards Hongling South (Qianhaiwan)

== Exits ==
Exit	Destination
Exit A	Baoyuan South Road (SW), Yu'an 1st Road (NW)
Exit B	Baoyuan South Road (SW), Yu'an 1st Road (SE)
Exit C	Baoyuan South Road (NE), Yu'an 1st Road (SE), Bao'an District government
Exit D	Baoyuan South Road (NE), Yu'an 1st Road (NW), Bao'an Stadium
