= Baohua station =

Metro station in Shenzhen, China

Coordinates: 22°32′59″N 113°53′7″E

Baohua 宝华
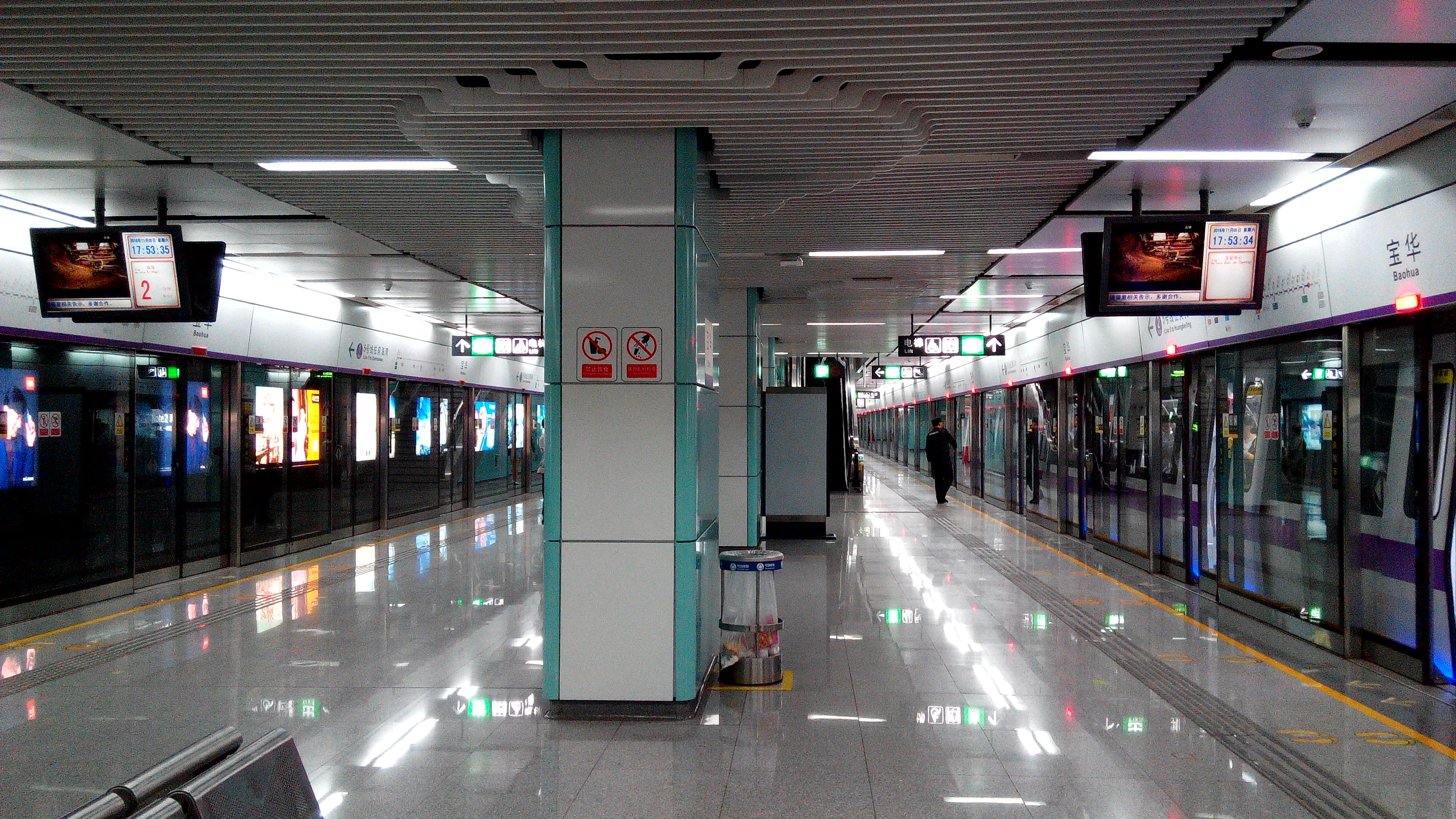

General information
- Location: Bao'an District, Shenzhen, Guangdong; China
- Operator: SZMC (Shenzhen Metro Group)
- Line: Line 5

History
- Opened: 22 June 2011

Services
Preceding station	Shenzhen Metro	Following station
Bao'an Center towards Grand Theater	Line 5	Linhai towards Chiwan
Location

Baohua station (Chinese: 宝华站; pinyin: Bǎohuá Zhàn; Jyutping: bou^{2} waa^{4} zaam^{6}) is a station of Line 5 of the Shenzhen Metro. It opened on 22 June 2011. This station is an underground station.

== Station layout ==
G	-	Exit
B1F; Concourse	Lobby	Customer Service, Shops, Vending machines, ATMs
B2F; Platforms	Platform 1	← 5 towards Chiwan (Linhai)
B2F; Platforms	Island platform, doors will open on the left
B2F; Platforms	Platform 2	→ 5 towards Grand Theater (Bao'an Center) →

== Exits ==
Exit		Destination
Exit A	A1	Baohua Road (W), Xinghua 1st Road, Haibin Square
Exit A	A2	Baohua Road (E), Logan Century Center, International Business Tower
Exit B	B1	Baohua Road (W)
Exit B	B2	Xinghua 1st Road (N)
Exit C		Xinghua 1st Road (N), Haibin Square, Xincheng Border Checkpoint (Transfer to Bus), Nantou Border Checkpoint (Transfer to Bus)
Exit D		Xinghua 1st Road (S), Bao'an Center Square
