= Nanshan station =

Shenzhen Metro Line 11 and Line 12 station

Nanshan 南山
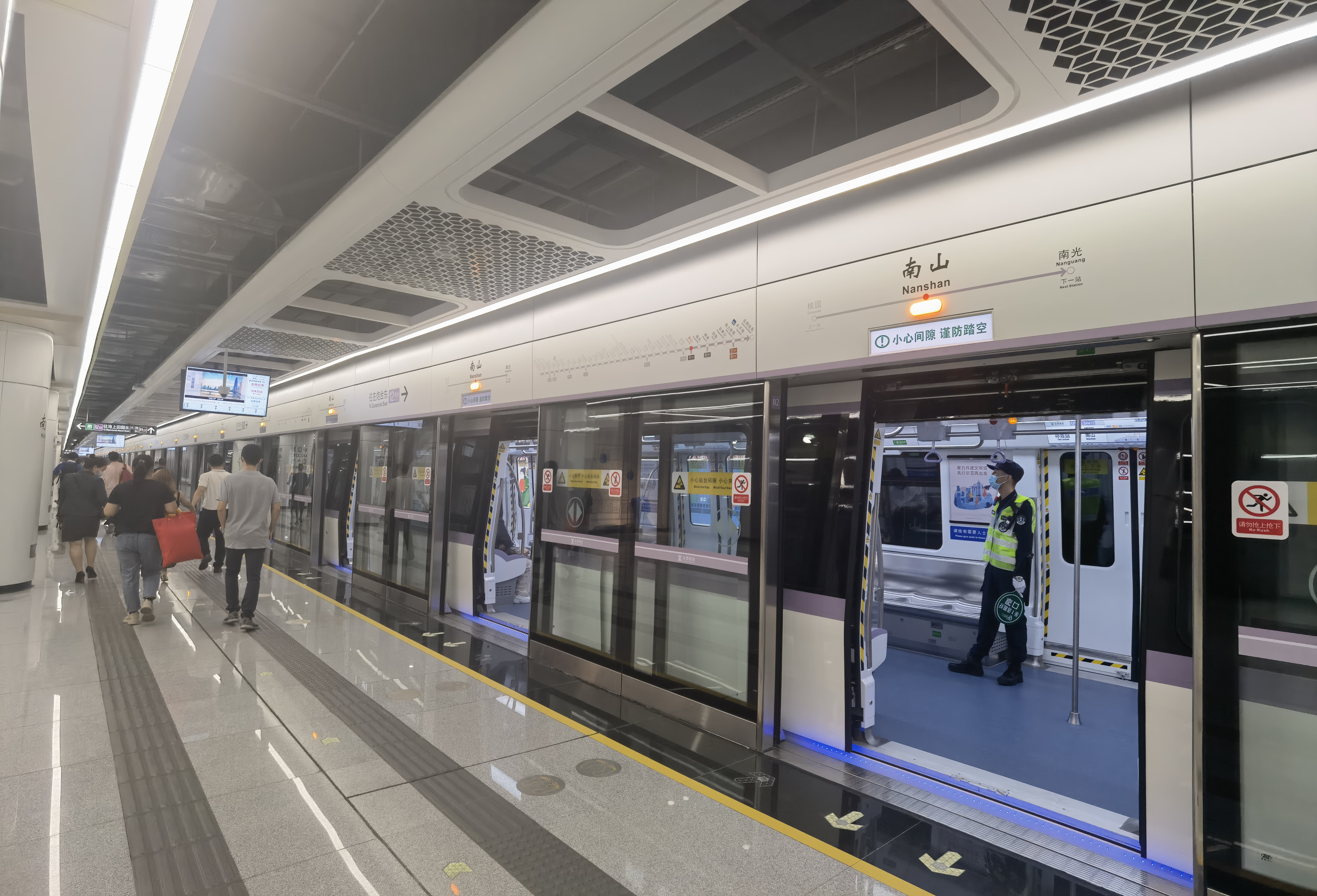
- Line 12 platform (towards Zuopaotai East)

Chinese name
- Chinese: 南山
Transcriptions
Standard Mandarin
- Hanyu Pinyin: Nánshān
Yue: Cantonese
- Yale Romanization: Nàahmsāan
- Jyutping: Namm4 Saan1

General information
- Location: Intersection of Nanshan Boulevard with Guimiao Road and Binhai Boulevard; Nanshan district, Shenzhen，Guangdong; China
- Coordinates: 22°31′26″N 113°55′23″E
- Operated by: SZMC (Shenzhen Metro Group); Shenzhen Line 12 Rail Transit Co., Ltd (Shenzhen Metro Group and PowerChina PPP)
- Lines: Line 11; Line 12
- Platforms: 4 (1 island platform and 2 side platforms)
- Tracks: 4

Construction
- Structure type: Underground
- Accessible: Yes

History
- Opened: Line 11: 28 June 2016 (9 years ago); Line 12: 28 November 2022 (3 years ago)

Services
Preceding station	Shenzhen Metro	Following station
Qianhaiwan towards Bitou	Line 11	Houhai towards Hongling South
Taoyuan towards Songgang	Line 12	Nanguang towards Zuopaotai East
Location

Nanshan station (Chinese: 南山站; pinyin: Nánshān Zhàn; Jyutping: Naam4 Saan1 Zaam6; Cantonese Yale: Nàahmsāan Jaahm) is an interchange station for Line 11 and Line 12 of the Shenzhen Metro. Line 11 platforms opened on 28 June 2016 and Line 12 platforms opened on 28 November 2022. The station is located under the intersection of Nanshan Boulevard, Guimiao Road and Binhai Boulevard.

== Station layout ==
G	-	Exit
B1F; Concourse	North Lobby	Ticket Machines, Customer Service, Shops, Vending Machines
B1F; Concourse		Guimiao Road Tunnel
B1F; Concourse	South Lobby	Ticket Machines, Customer Service, Station Control Room
B2F; Concourse & 12 Platforms	West Lobby	Ticket Machines, Customer Service, Shops, Vending Machines
B2F; Concourse & 12 Platforms	Side platform, doors will open on the right
B2F; Concourse & 12 Platforms	Platform	12 towards Songgang (Taoyuan)
B2F; Concourse & 12 Platforms	Platform	12 towards Zuopaotai East (Nanguang)
B2F; Concourse & 12 Platforms	Side platform, doors will open on the right
B2F; Concourse & 12 Platforms	East Lobby	Customer Service, Shops, Vending machines, ATMs
B3F; 11 Platforms	Platform	11 towards Bitou (Qianhaiwan)
B3F; 11 Platforms	Island platform, doors will open on the left
B3F; 11 Platforms	Platform	11 towards Hongling South (Houhai)
B3F; Passageways	-	Passageways between West & East Lobbies and Line 12 Platforms

=== Entrances/exits ===
The station has 5 points of entry/exit, with Exits D and H being accessible via elevators.

Exit		Destination
Exit A		Guimiao Road (S), Nanshan Boulevard (W), Jintian Garden, Xiangnan Estate, Beitou Estate
Exit B	B1	Nanshan Boulevard (W), Nanshan Police Station, Jintian Garden, Xiangnan Estate, Xinnan Estate
Exit B	B2	Nanshan Boulevard (W), Nanshan Police Station, Jintian Garden, Xiangnan Estate, Xinnan Estate
Exit D		Guimiao Road (S), Nanshan Boulevard (E), Glorious New Century, Nanguang City Garden, Nanguang Estate, Xiangnan Primary School, Hongrui Garden
Exit E	E1	Guimiao Road (N), Nanshan Boulevard (E), China Southern Airlines Shenzhen Branch, Glorious New Century, Xuefu Garden, West Electricity Co, Ltd., Guimiao New Estate, Xiangnan Ruifeng, Vientiane New Park
Exit E	E2	Guimiao Road (N), Nanshan Boulevard (E), China Southern Airlines Shenzhen Branch, Glorious New Century, Xuefu Garden, West Electricity Co, Ltd., Guimiao New Estate, Xiangnan Ruifeng, Vientiane New Park
Exit F		Nanshan Boulevard (E), China Southern Airlines Shenzhen Branch, Xuefu Garden, Kangle Building, Guimiao Estate, Xiangnan Ruifeng
Exit G		Nanshan Boulevard (E), Lifang Estate, Yilida Estate
Exit H		Guimiao Road (N), Nanshan Boulevard (W), Nanshan Street Office, Shuntian Building, Nanshan Market, Yuehai People's Court

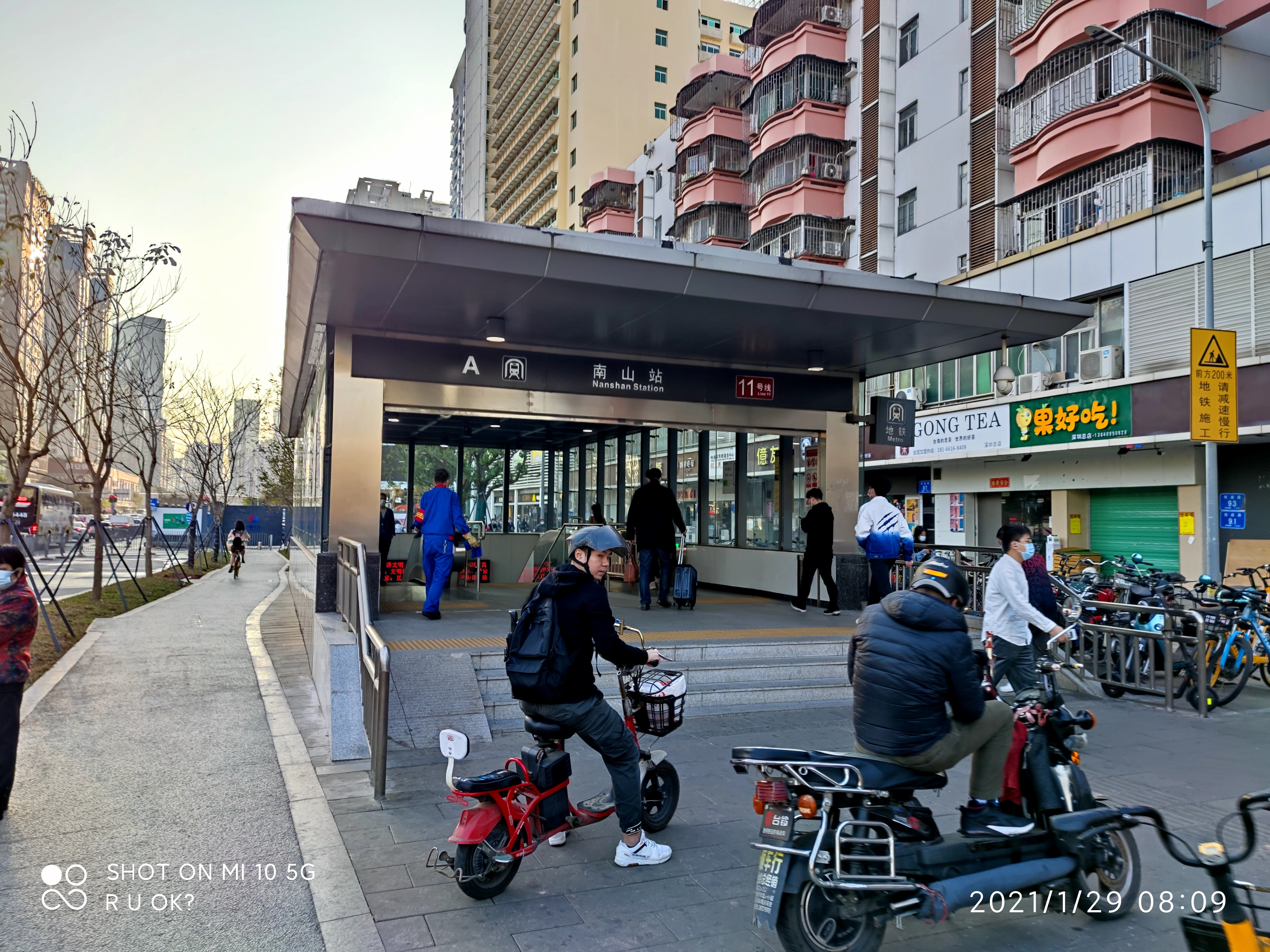
Entrance A

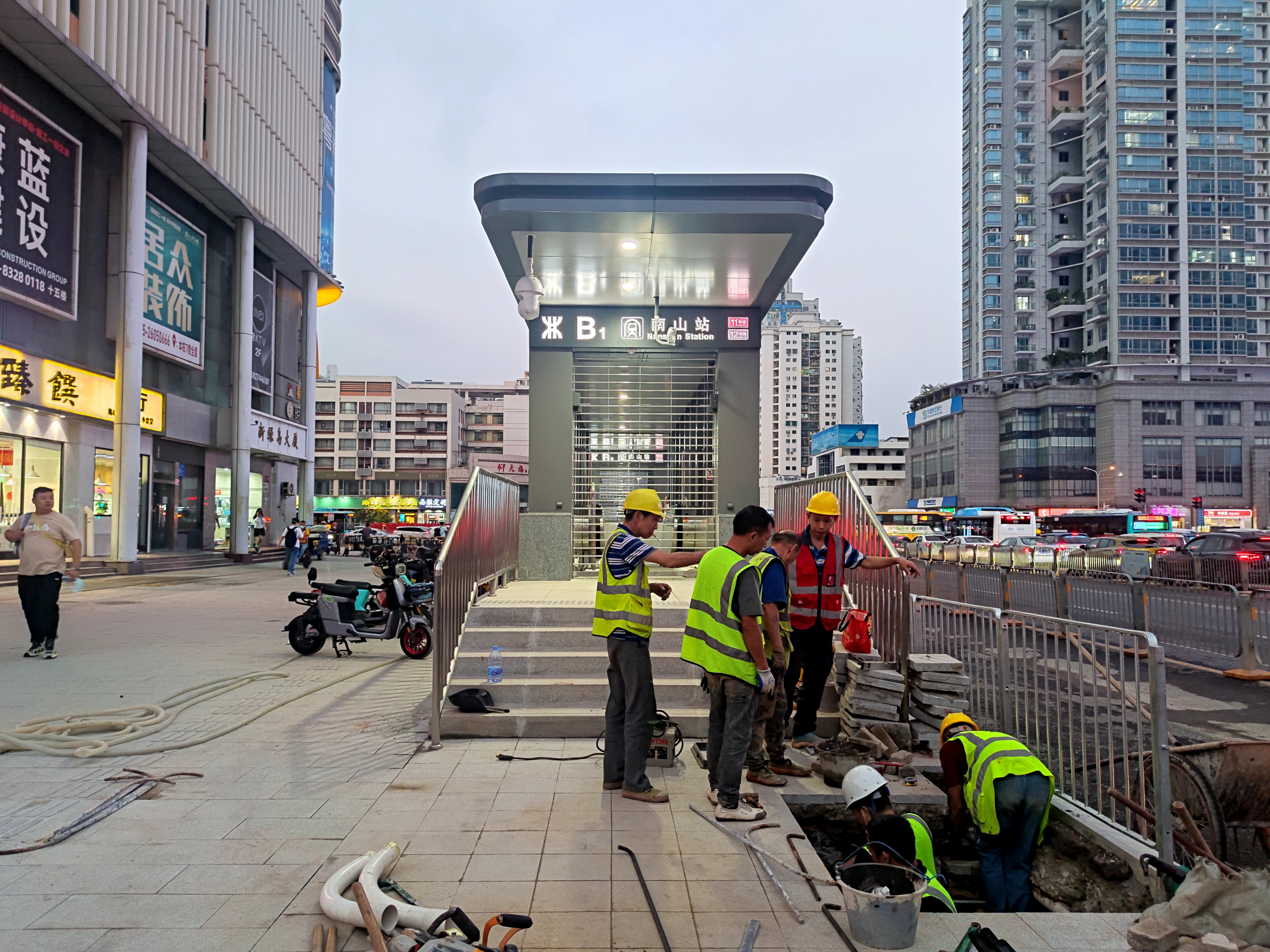
Entrance B1

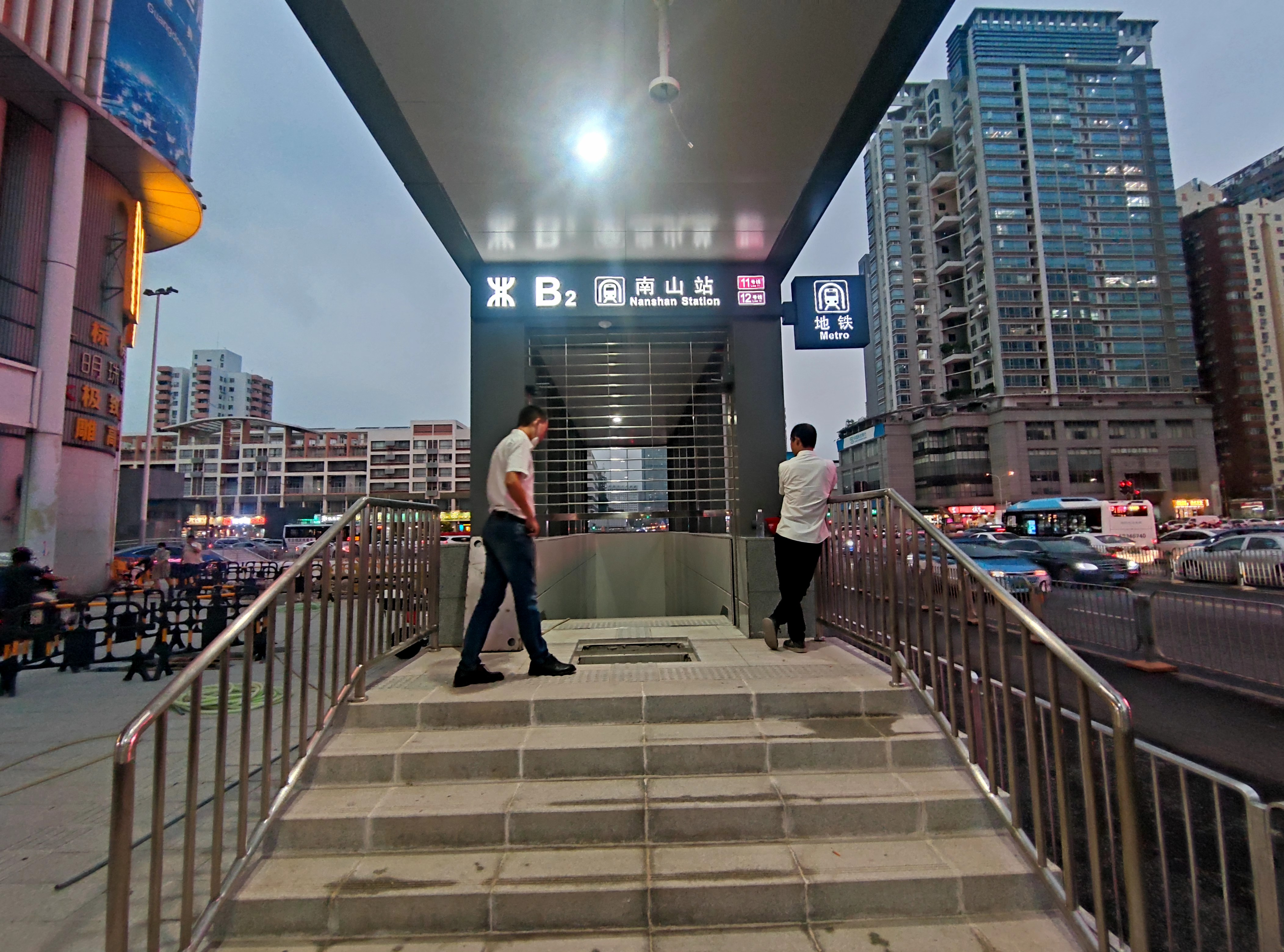
Entrance B2

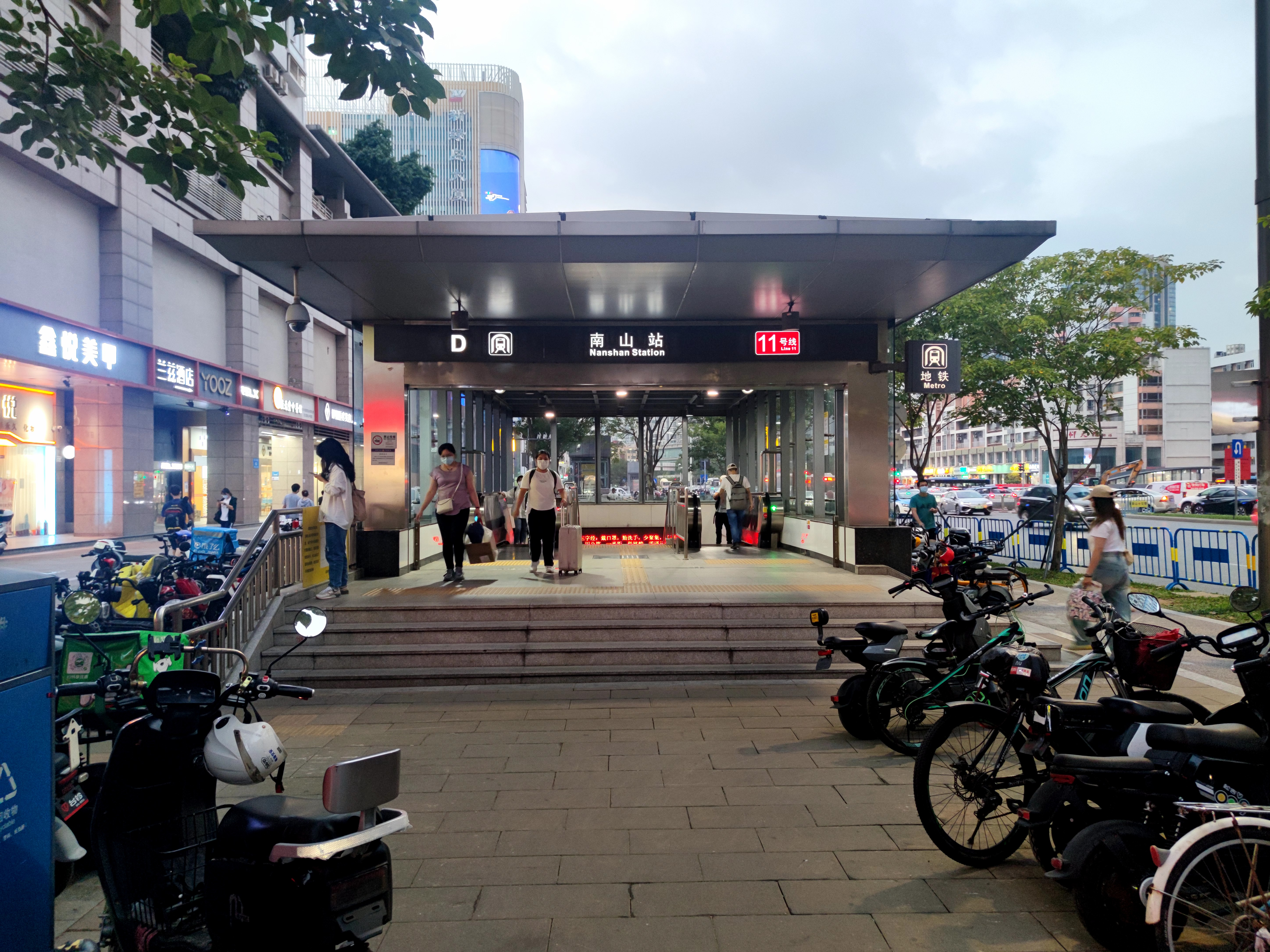
Entrance D

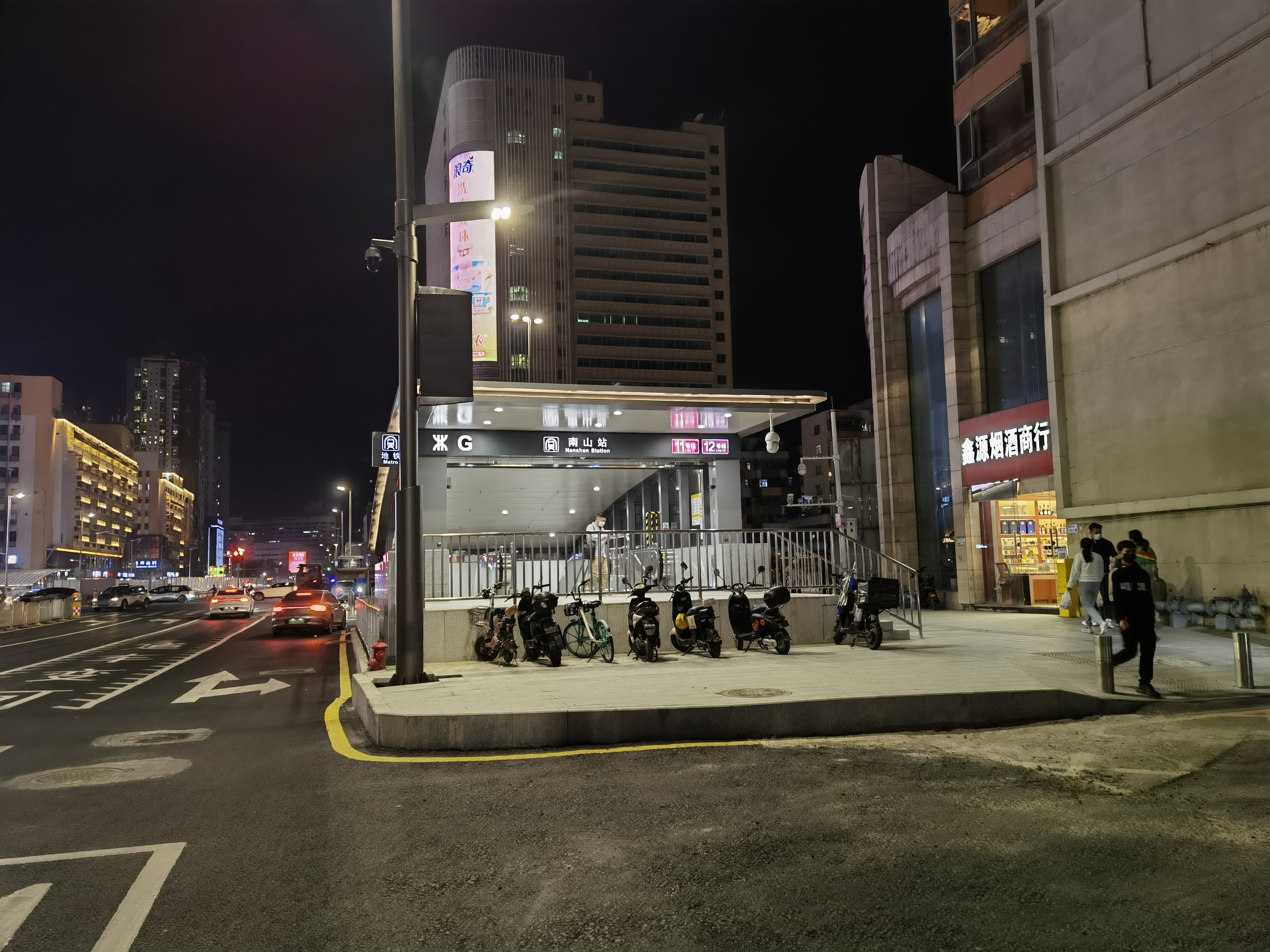
Entrance G

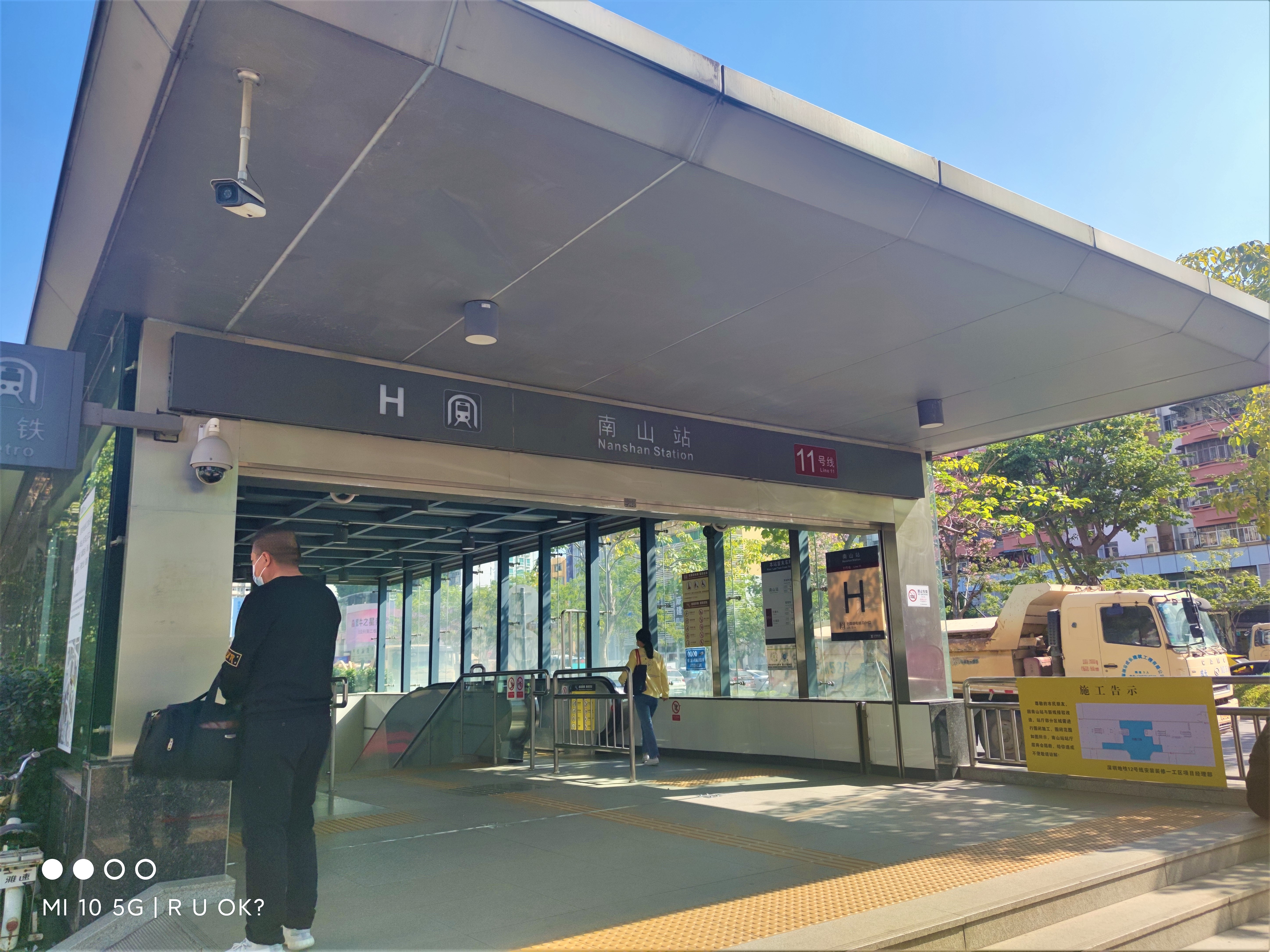
Entrance H

== Gallery ==
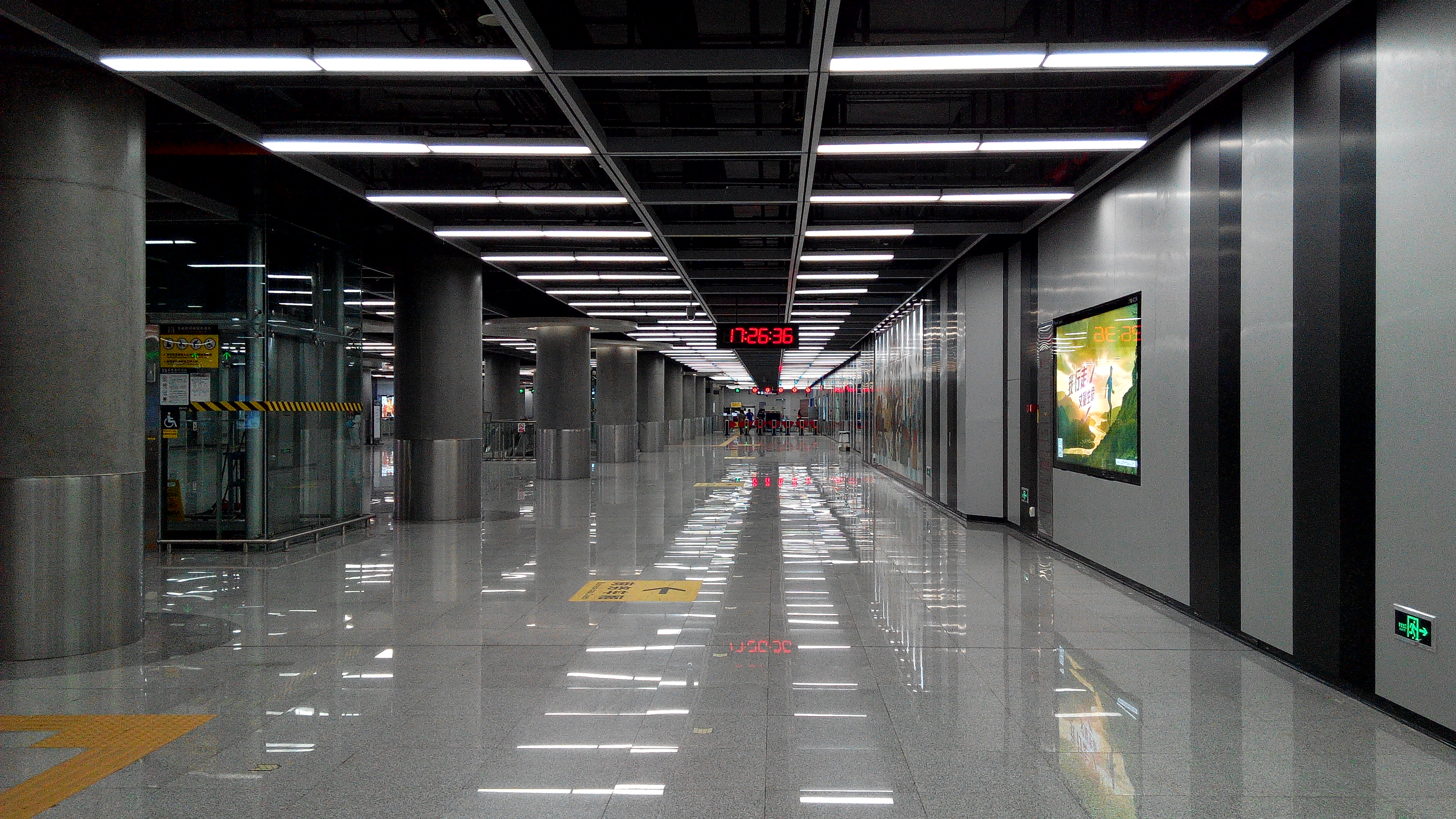
Concourse

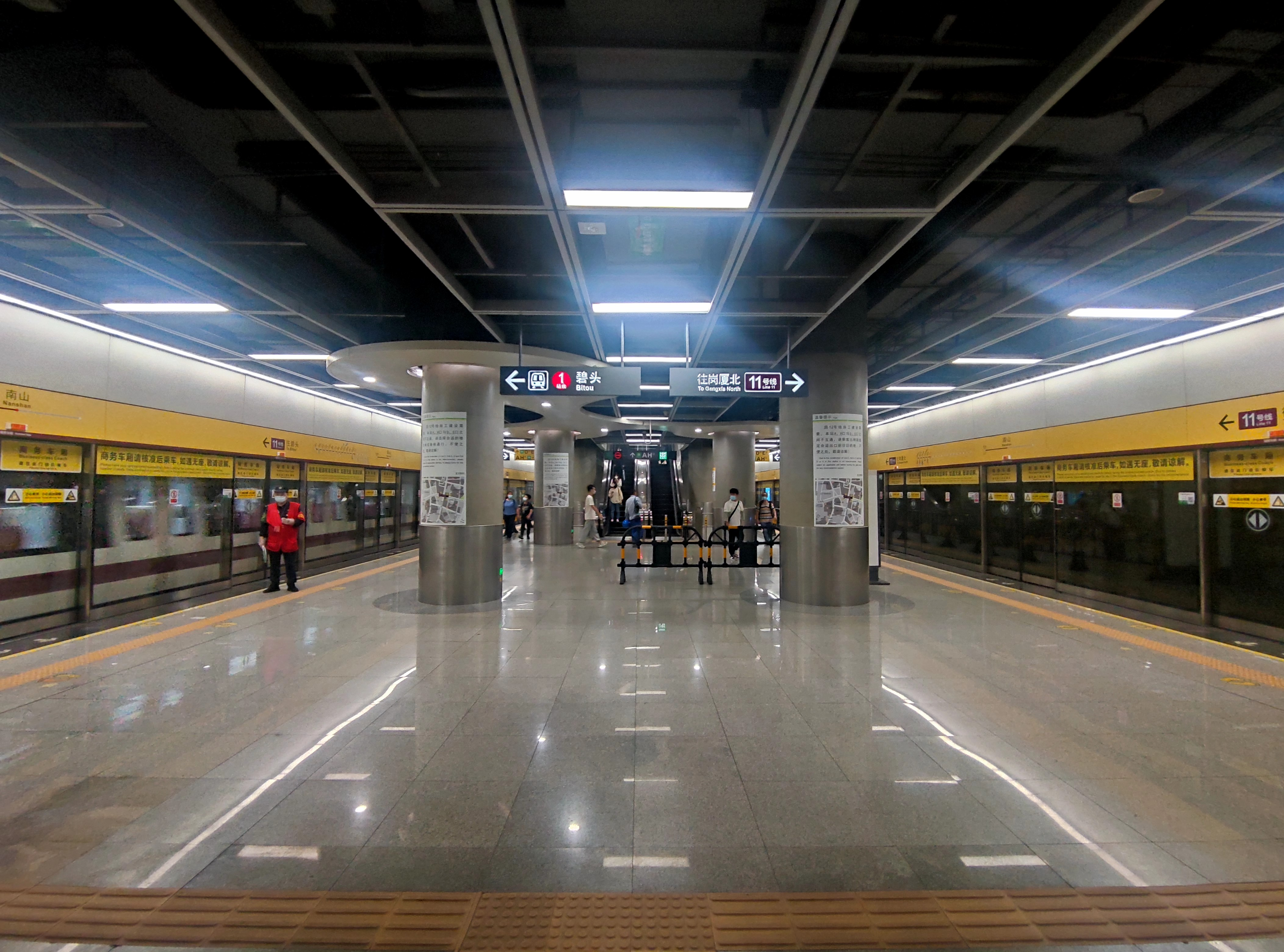
Line 11 platform

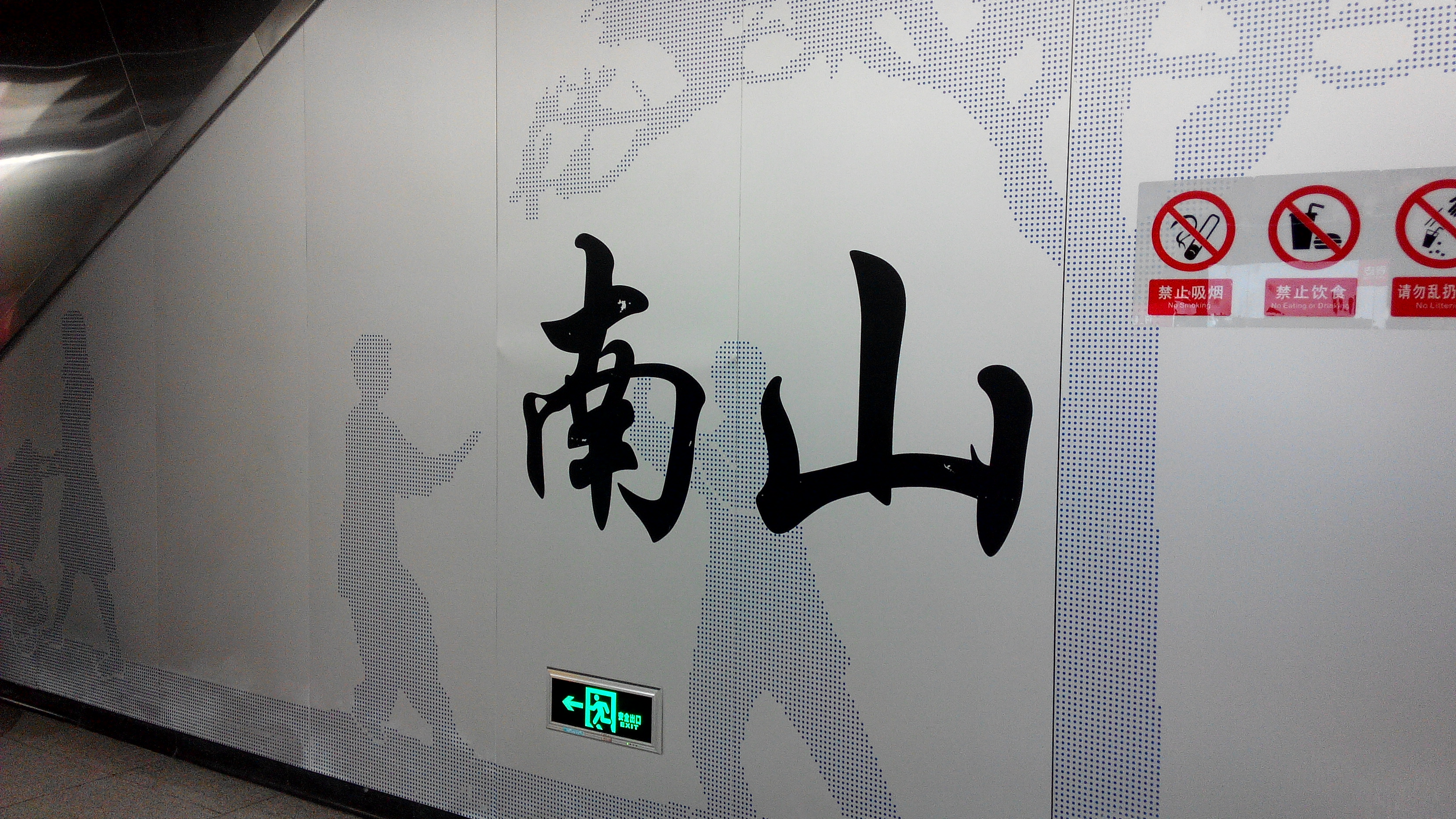
Line 11 calligraphy

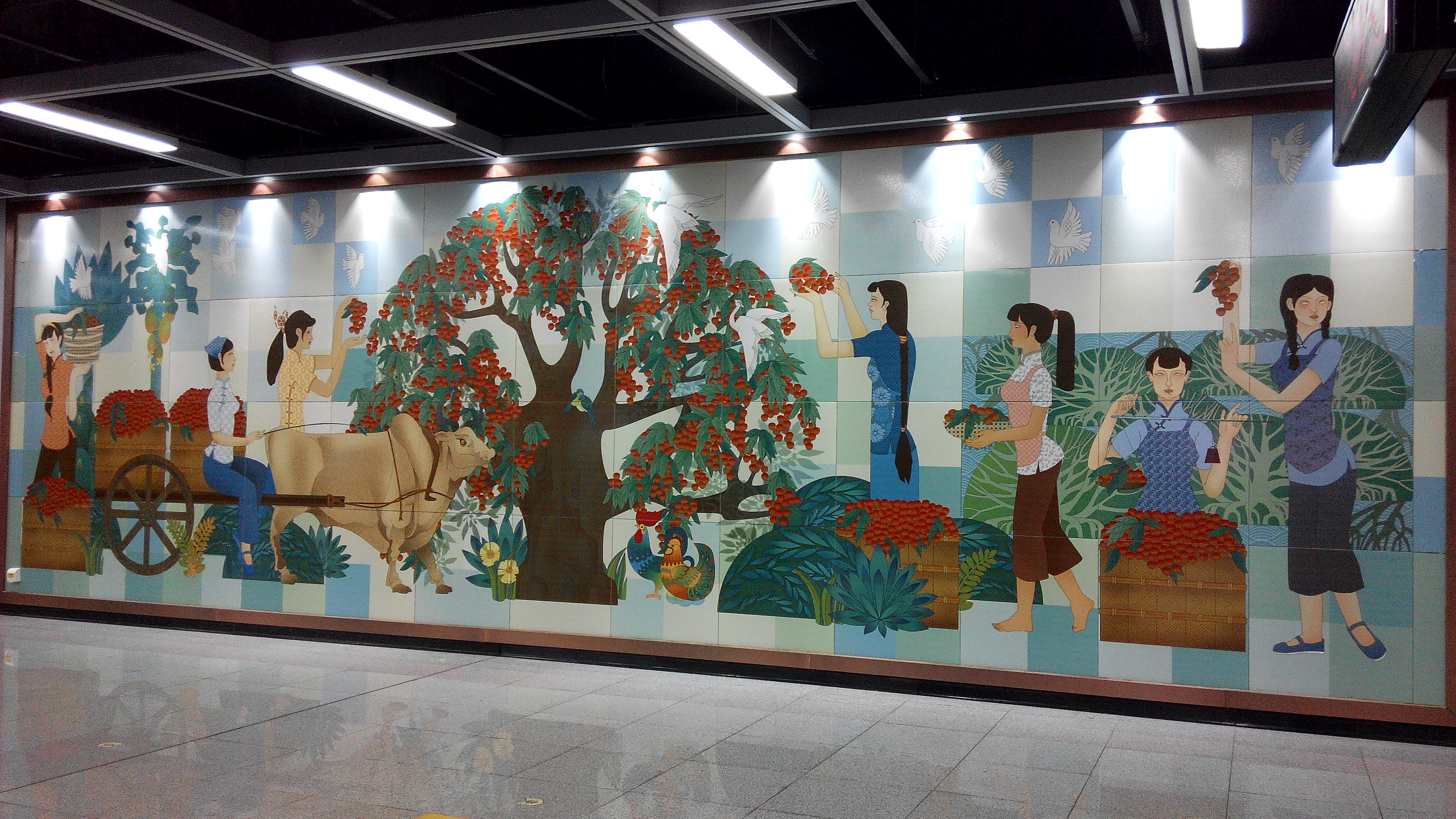
Art wall
