= Xin'an station =

Metro station in Shenzhen, China

Coordinates: 22°32′51″N 113°53′41″E

Xin'an 新安
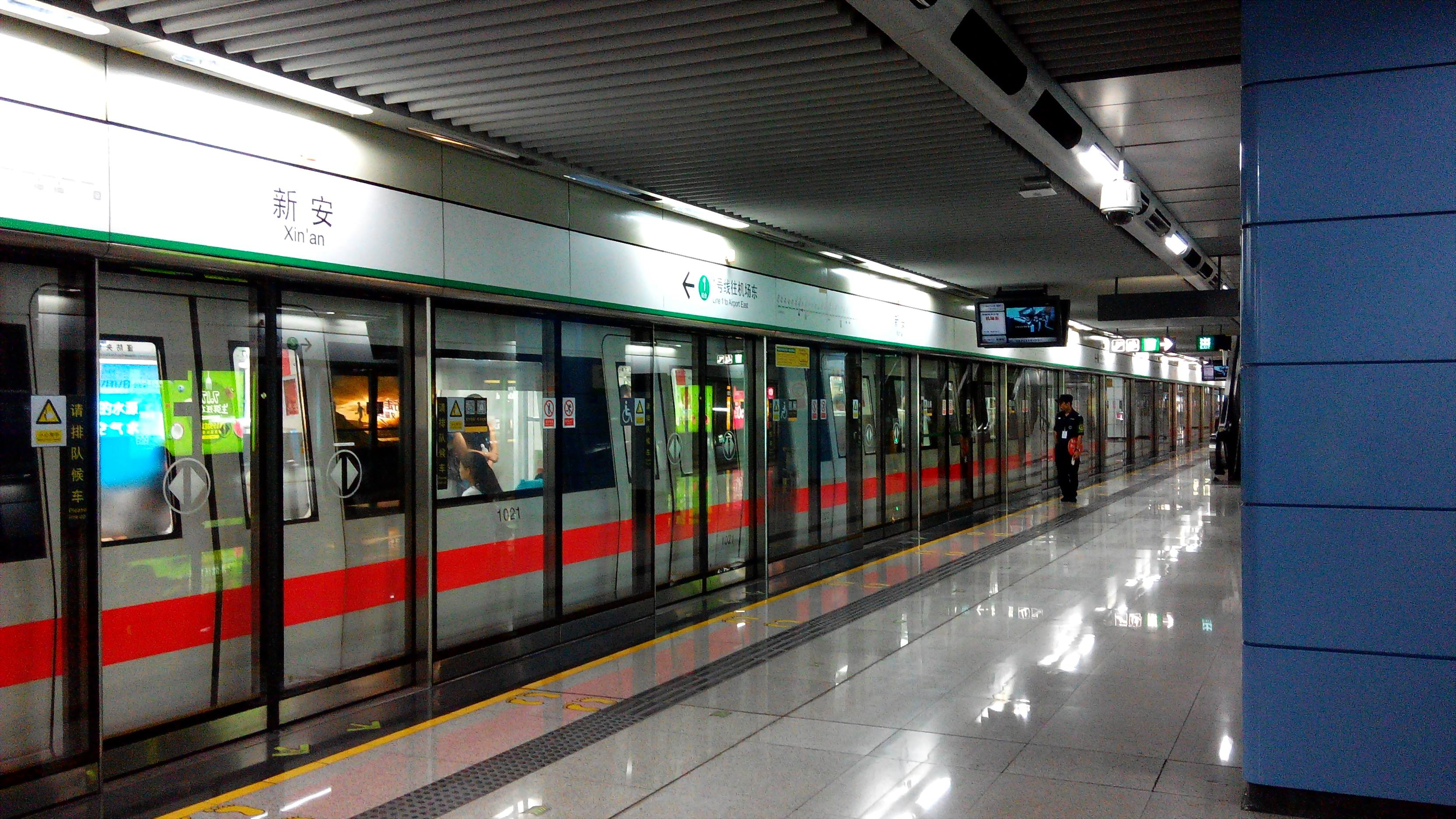
- Platform of Xin'an Station in 2016.

Chinese name
- Chinese: 新安站
Transcriptions
Standard Mandarin
- Hanyu Pinyin: Xīn-Ān
Yue: Cantonese
- Jyutping: San1 On1

General information
- Location: Bao'an District, Shenzhen, Guangdong; China
- Operated by: SZMC (Shenzhen Metro Group)
- Line: Line 1
- Platforms: 2 (1 island platform)
- Tracks: 2

Construction
- Structure type: Underground
- Accessible: Yes

Other information
- Station code: 108

History
- Opened: 15 June 2011; 15 years ago

Services
Preceding station	Shenzhen Metro	Following station
Bao'an Center towards Airport East	Line 1	Qianhaiwan towards Luohu
Route map
Location

Xin'an station (Chinese: 新安站; pinyin: Xīn'ān Zhàn; Jyutping: San1 On1 Zaam6) is a station on Line 1 of the Shenzhen Metro in Shenzhen, Guangdong Province, China. The station opened on 15 June 2011.

== Station layout ==
G	–	Exit
B1F; Concourse	Lobby	Customer Service, Shops, Vending machines, ATMs
B2F; Platforms	Platform 1	← Line 1 towards Airport East (Bao'an Center)
B2F; Platforms	Island platform, doors will open on the left
B2F; Platforms	Platform 2	Line 1 towards Luohu (Qianhaiwan) →

== Exits ==
Exit	Destination
Exit A	Xinhu Road (N), Xin'an 1st Road (E), Bao'an Shiyan School, Kaixuan Town, Xincheng Border Checkpoint
Exit B	Xinhu Road (N), Xin'an 1st Road (W), Zhongnan Garden, Xinjin'an Yayuan
Exit C	Xinhu Road (N), Jia'an Road, Nobiary Domain, Xi'an Tea Town
Exit D	Xinhu Road (S), Jia'an Road, Royal Bay Phase I
Exit E	Xinhu Road (S), Xin'an 1st Road, Central Blood Center of Bao'an District, Royal Bay Phase II
