= Bihaiwan station =

Metro station in Shenzhen, China

Coordinates: 22°34′44″N 113°51′01″E

Bihaiwan 碧海湾
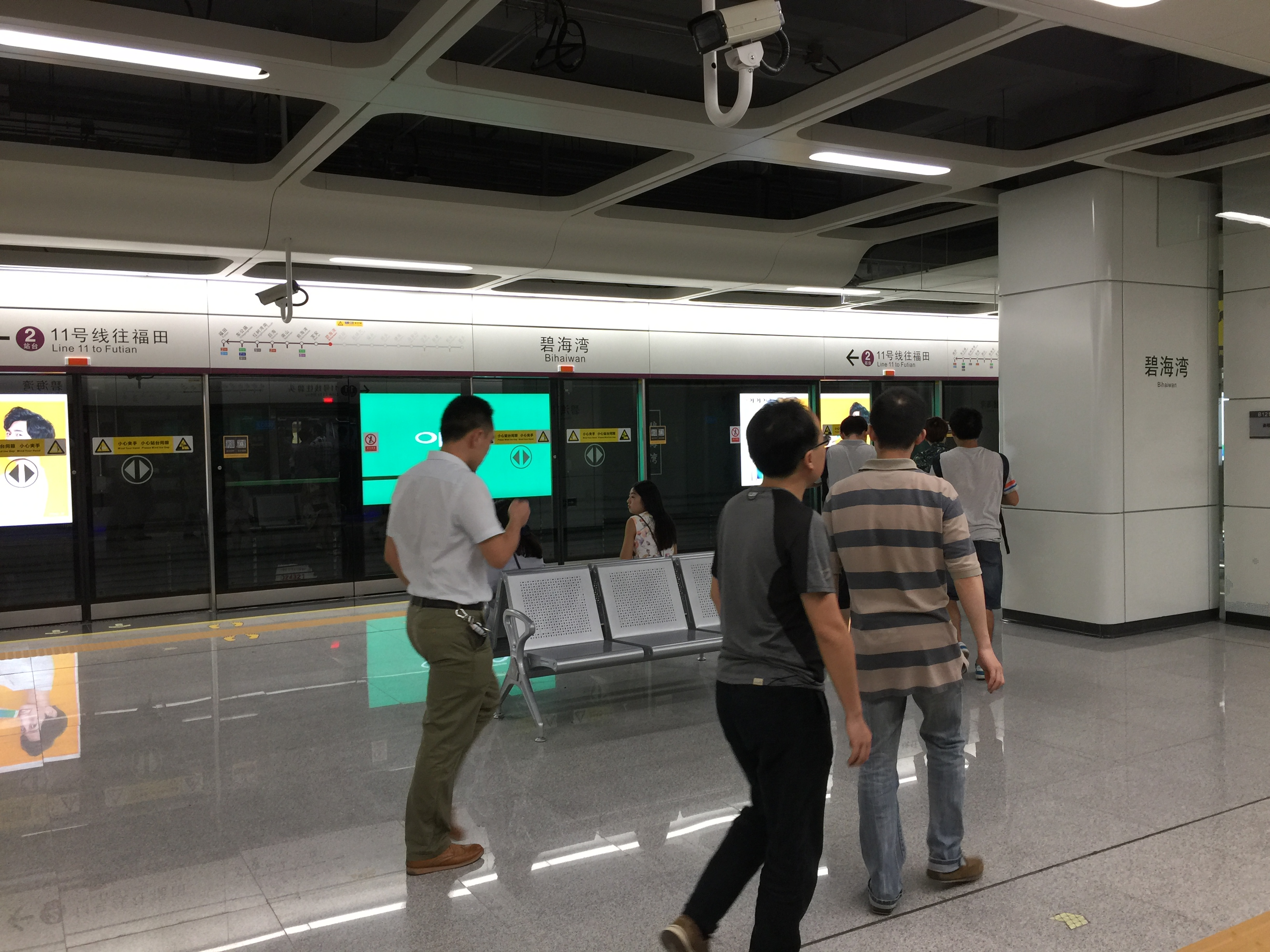

General information
- Location: Bao'an District, Shenzhen; Guangdong; China
- Operated by: SZMC (Shenzhen Metro Group)
- Line: Line 11
- Platforms: 2 (1 island platform)
- Tracks: 2

Construction
- Structure type: Underground
- Accessible: Yes

History
- Opened: 28 June 2016 (9 years ago)

Services
Preceding station	Shenzhen Metro	Following station
Airport towards Bitou	Line 11	Bao'an towards Hongling South
Location

Bihaiwan station (simplified Chinese: 碧海湾站; traditional Chinese: 碧海灣站; Jyutping: Bik1 Hoi2 Waan1 Zaam6) is a station on Line 11 of the Shenzhen Metro. It opened on 28 June 2016.

== Station layout ==
G	-	Exits A-E
B1F; Concourse	Lobby	Ticket Machines, Customer Service, Shops, Vending Machines
B2F; Platforms	Platform	11 towards Bitou (Airport)
B2F; Platforms	Island platform, doors will open on the left
B2F; Platforms	Platform	11 towards Hongling South (Bao'an)

== Exits ==
Exit	Destination
Exit A	Baoyuan Road (SW), Jinhai Road (NW), Songmaoyulong Bay, Hengsheng Hospital
Exit B	Baoyuan Road (SW), Jinhai Road (SE), Taihua Sunshine Sea, Haigang Primary School
Exit C	Baoyuan Road (NE), Jinhai Road (SE), Bihaiwan Garden, Haiwanmingzhu Garden
Exit D	Baoyuan Road (NE), Jinhai Road (NW), Xiwan Primary School, Shenzhen Haiwan Junior School
Exit E	Baoyuan Road (NE), Xixiang Sports center, Jinmin Garden, Jinxin Garden, Xiwan Primary School, Shenzhen Haiwan Junior School
