= Airport station (Shenzhen Metro) =

Metro station in Shenzhen, Guangdong, China

Airport 机场
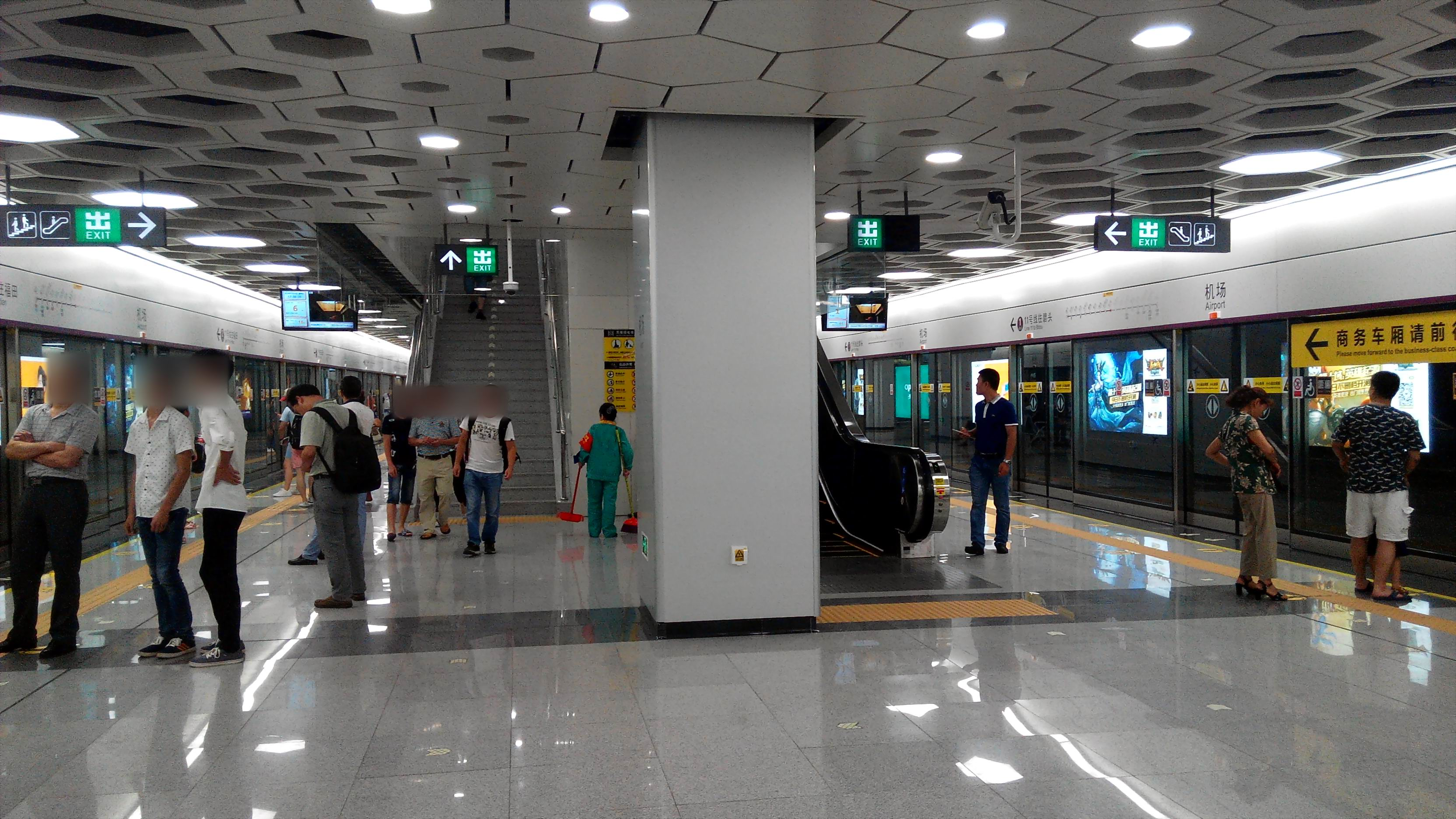

Chinese name
- Traditional Chinese: 機場站
- Simplified Chinese: 机场站
Transcriptions
Standard Mandarin
- Hanyu Pinyin: jīchǎngzhàn
Yue: Cantonese
- Jyutping: Gei1 Coeng4 Zaam6

General information
- Other names: Airport (T3)
- Location: Shenzhen; Guangdong; China
- Coordinates: 22°37′35″N 113°48′32″E
- Operated by: SZMC (Shenzhen Metro Group)
- Line: Line 11
- Platforms: 2 (1 island platform)
- Tracks: 2
- Connections: Shenzhen Bao'an International Airport; Shenzhen Airport

Construction
- Structure type: Underground
- Accessible: Yes

Other information
- IATA code: SZX

History
- Opened: 28 June 2016 (9 years ago)

Services
Preceding station	Shenzhen Metro	Following station
Airport North towards Bitou	Line 11	Bihaiwan towards Hongling South
Location

Airport station (Chinese: 机场站) is a station on Line 11 of the Shenzhen Metro. It opened on 28 June 2016. The station is located underneath Terminal T3 of Shenzhen Bao'an International Airport.

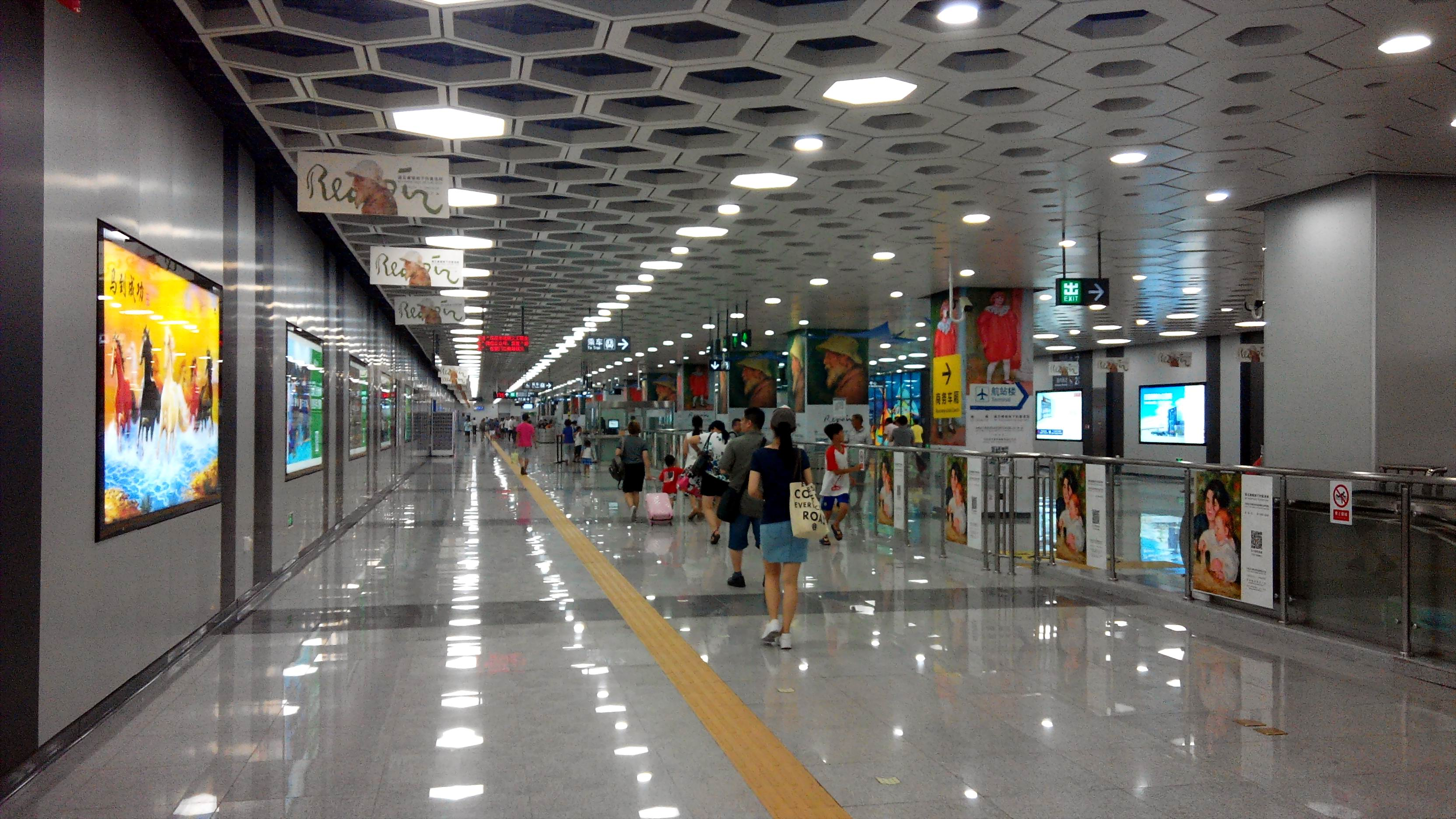
Concourse

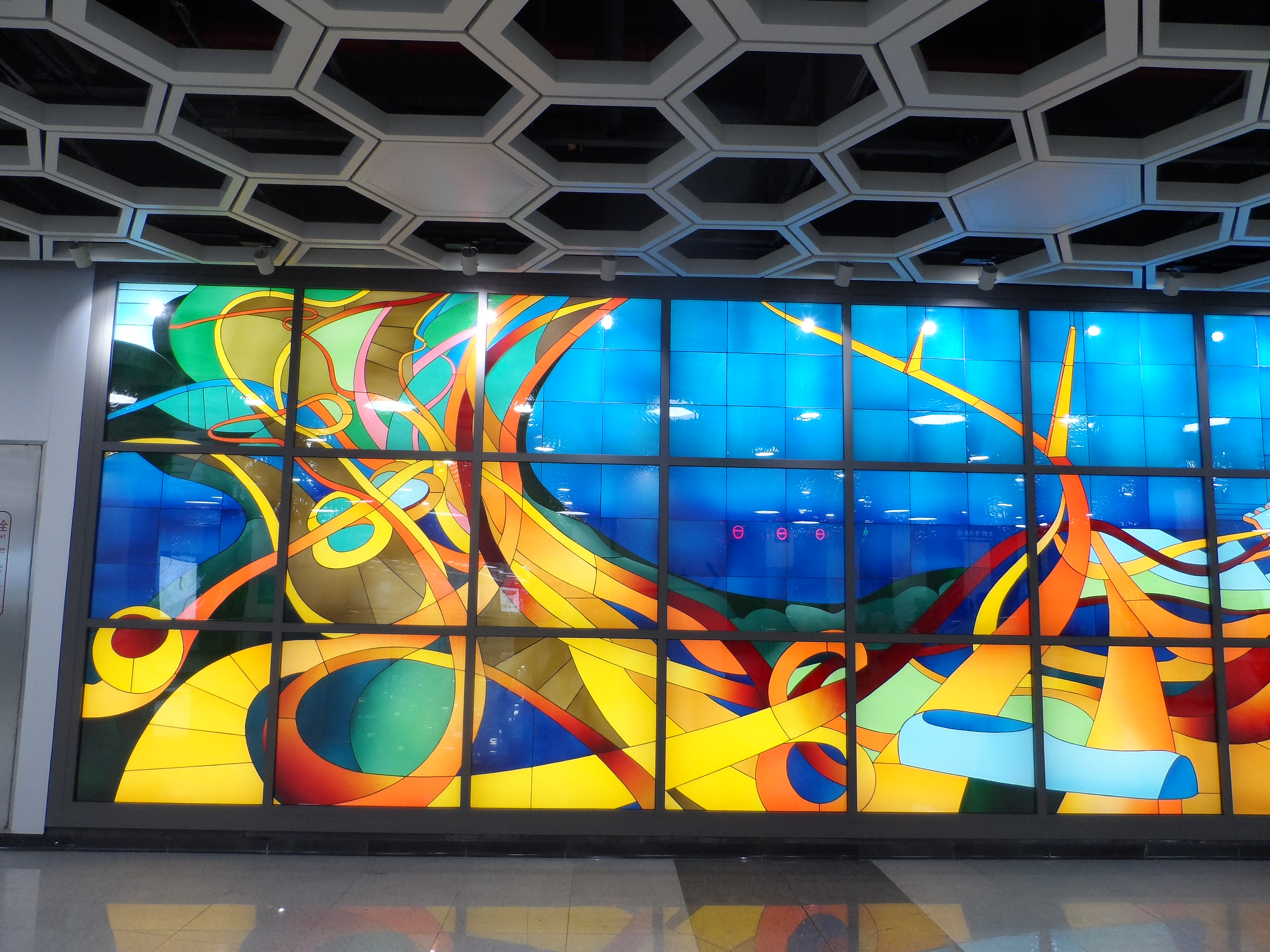
Cultural Art Wall "Bridge the World"

== Station layout ==
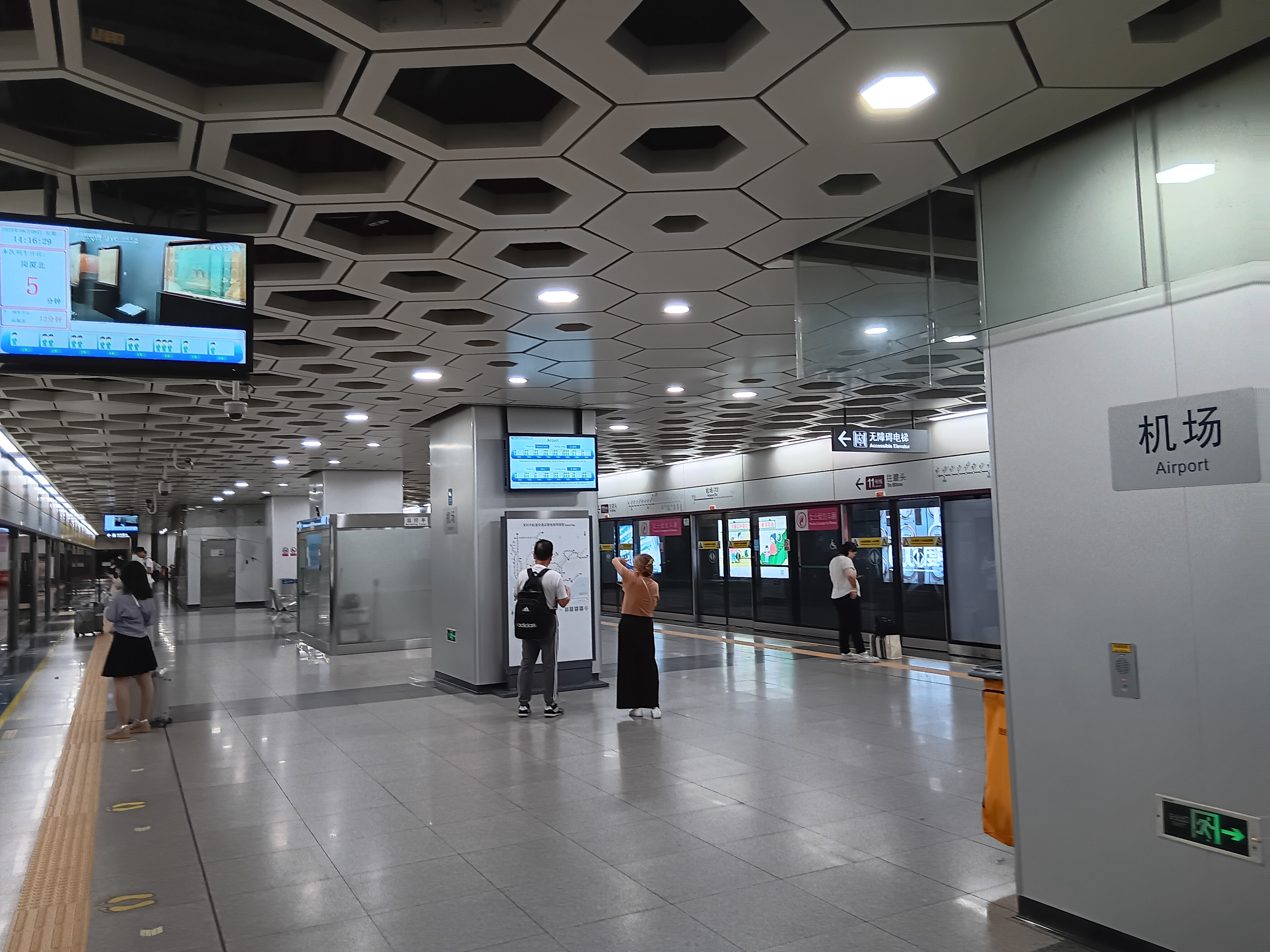
Platforms

G	-	Exits A-D
B1F; Concourse	Lobby	Ticket Machines, Customer Service, Shops, Vending Machines
B2F; Platforms	Platform	11 towards Bitou (Airport North)
B2F; Platforms	Island platform, doors will open on the left
B2F; Platforms	Platform'	11 towards Hongling South (Bihaiwan)

== Exits ==
Exit	Destination
Exit A	West Side of Konggang 8th Road
Exit B	East Side of Konggang 8th Road, Shenzhen Airport Terminal, Ground Transportation Center (GTC), Shenzhen Airport Bus Station
Exit C	Shenzhen Airport Terminal, Ground Transportation Center (GTC)
Exit D	Airport Pay-in VIP Building
