= Guiwan station =

Metro station in Shenzhen, Guangdong, China

Coordinates: 22°31′46″N 113°59′6″E

Guiwan 桂湾
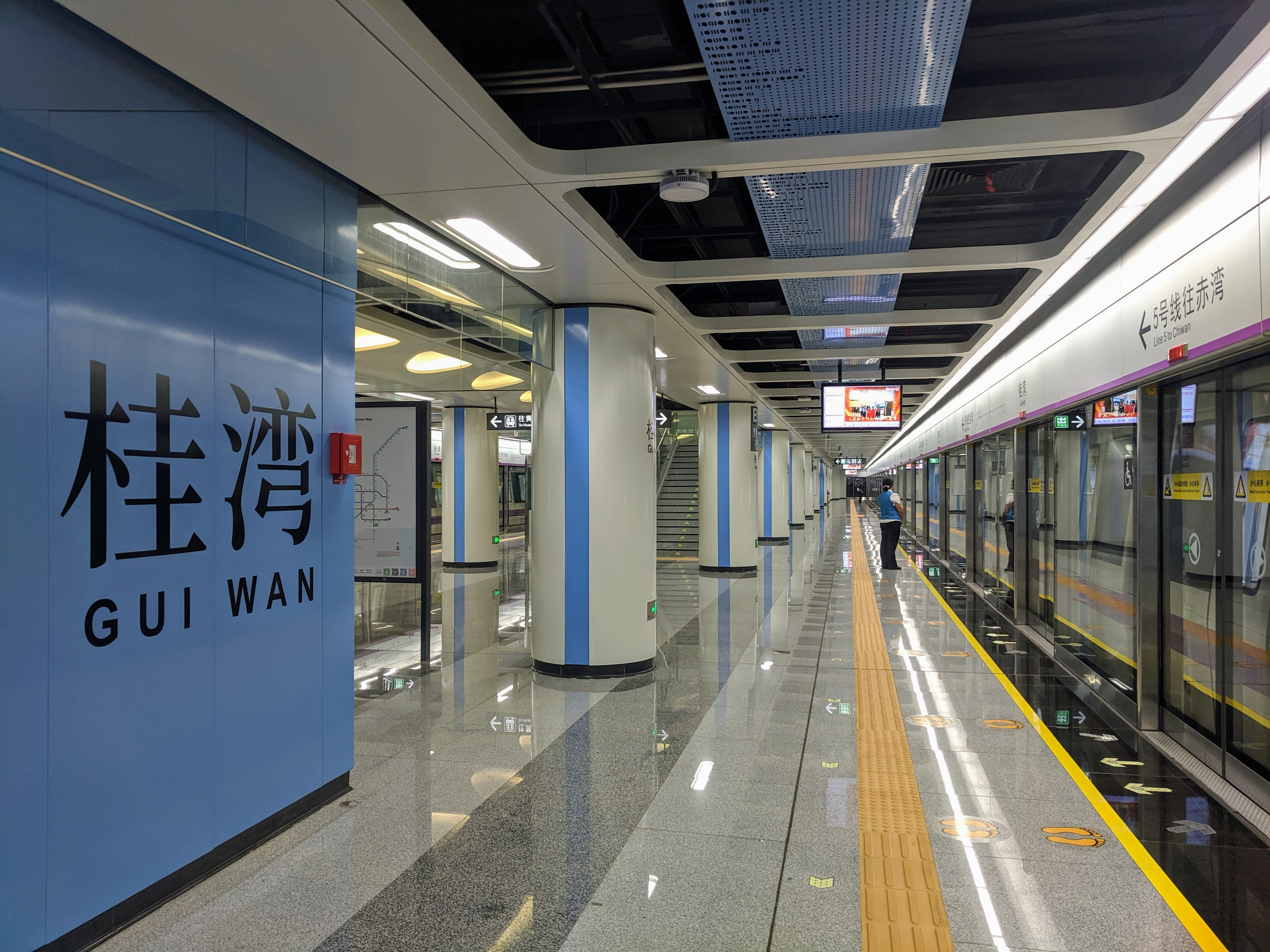

General information
- Location: Nanshan District, Shenzhen, Guangdong; China
- Operator: SZMC (Shenzhen Metro Group)
- Line: Line 5
- Platforms: 2 (1 island platform)
- Tracks: 2

Construction
- Structure type: Underground
- Accessible: Yes

History
- Opened: 28 September 2019

Services
Preceding station	Shenzhen Metro	Following station
Qianhaiwan towards Grand Theater	Line 5	Qianwan towards Chiwan
Location

Guiwan station (Chinese: 桂湾站; pinyin: Guìwān Zhàn; Jyutping: gwai^{3} waan^{1} zaam^{6}) is a station of Line 5 of the Shenzhen Metro. It opened on 28 September 2019.

== Station layout ==
G	-	Exit
B1F; Concourse	Lobby	Customer Service, Shops, Vending machines, ATMs
B2F; Platforms	Platform	← Line 5 towards Chiwan (Qianwan)
B2F; Platforms	Island platform, doors will open on the left
B2F; Platforms	Platform	→ Line 5 towards Grand Theater (Qianhaiwan) →

== Exits ==
Exit	Destination
Exit E	CR Qianhai Center, Qianhai Hong Rong Yuan Center, Qianhai Financial Center, One Excellence
