= Bay Glory =

Giant ferris wheel in Shenzhen

- 湾区之光

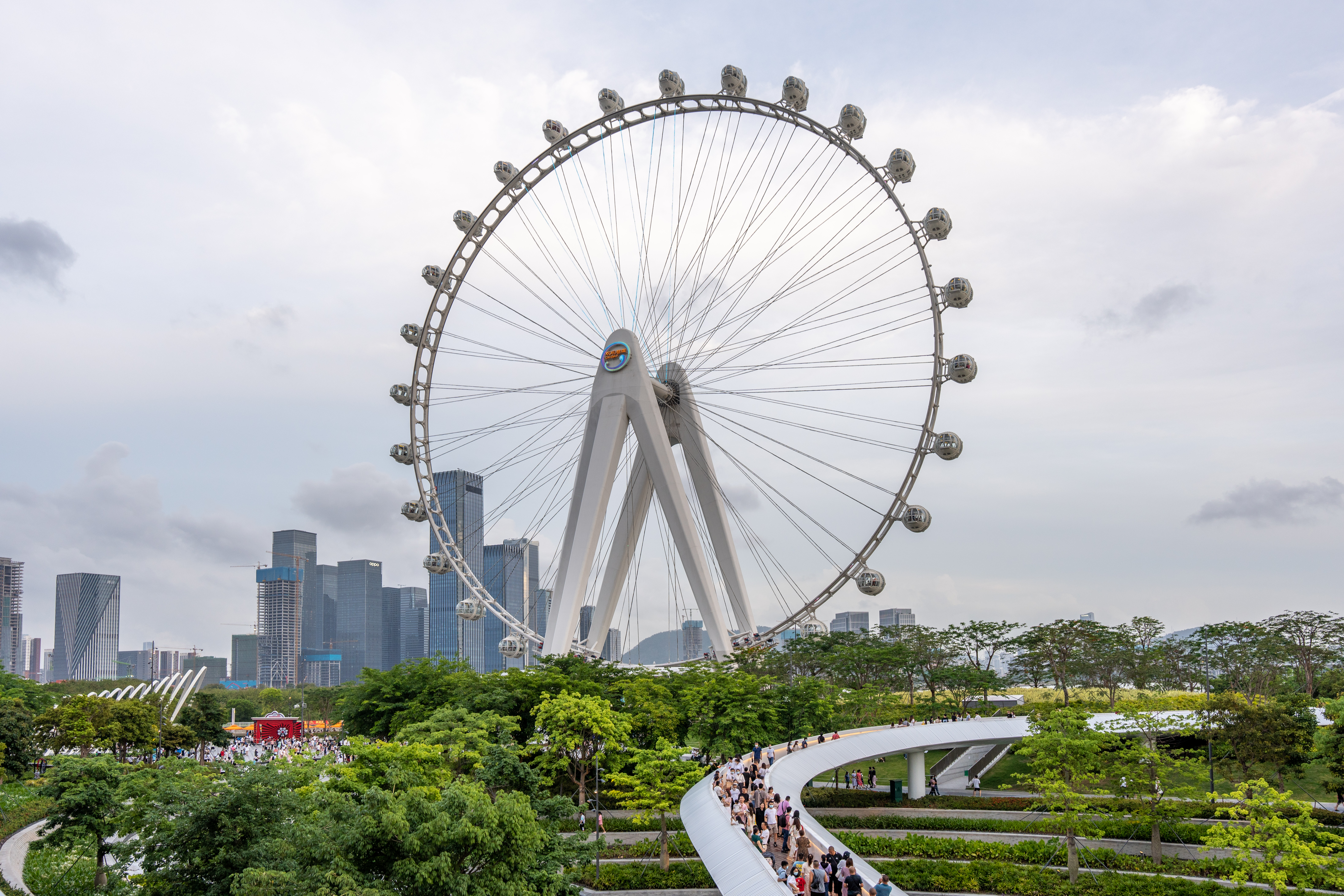
- Bay Glory in 2022
- Interactive map of the Bay Glory area

General information
- Status: Completed
- Type: Giant ferris wheel
- Location: OCT Oh Bay Haibin Culture Park; Xin'an, Bao'an, Shenzhen, Guangdong, China
- Coordinates: 22.5441°N 113.8830°E
- Opened: 18 April 2021

Height
- Height: 128 metres (420 ft)

Dimensions
- Diameter: 113.3 metres (372 ft)

Bay Glory
- Simplified Chinese: 湾区之光
- Traditional Chinese: 灣區之光
Transcriptions
Standard Mandarin
- Hanyu Pinyin: Wānqū Zhī Guāng
Yue: Cantonese
- Jyutping: waan1 keoi1 zi1 gwong1

The Bay Glory (simplified Chinese: 湾区之光; traditional Chinese: 灣區之光) is a giant cantilevered observation wheel located at Qianhai Bay, Shenzhen, China. It is operated by OCT and opened to the public on 18 April 2021.

== Design ==
The structure has an overall height of 128 metres (420 feet) and the wheel has a diameter of 113.3 metres (372 feet). It has 28 gondolas, each gondola has a net area of 16.8 m^{2} and can seat a maximum of 25 passengers. Passengers can see the scenery of Qianhai Bay and Pearl River estuary Lingdingyang from the gondola.

== Transportation ==
- Metro

Line 5 - Linhai (Exit B2)

- Drive

Drive through Baohua South Road and enter the Underground Parking of OCT Oh Bay
