= Qianhaiwan station =

Metro station in Shenzhen, Guangdong, China

Qianhaiwan 前海湾
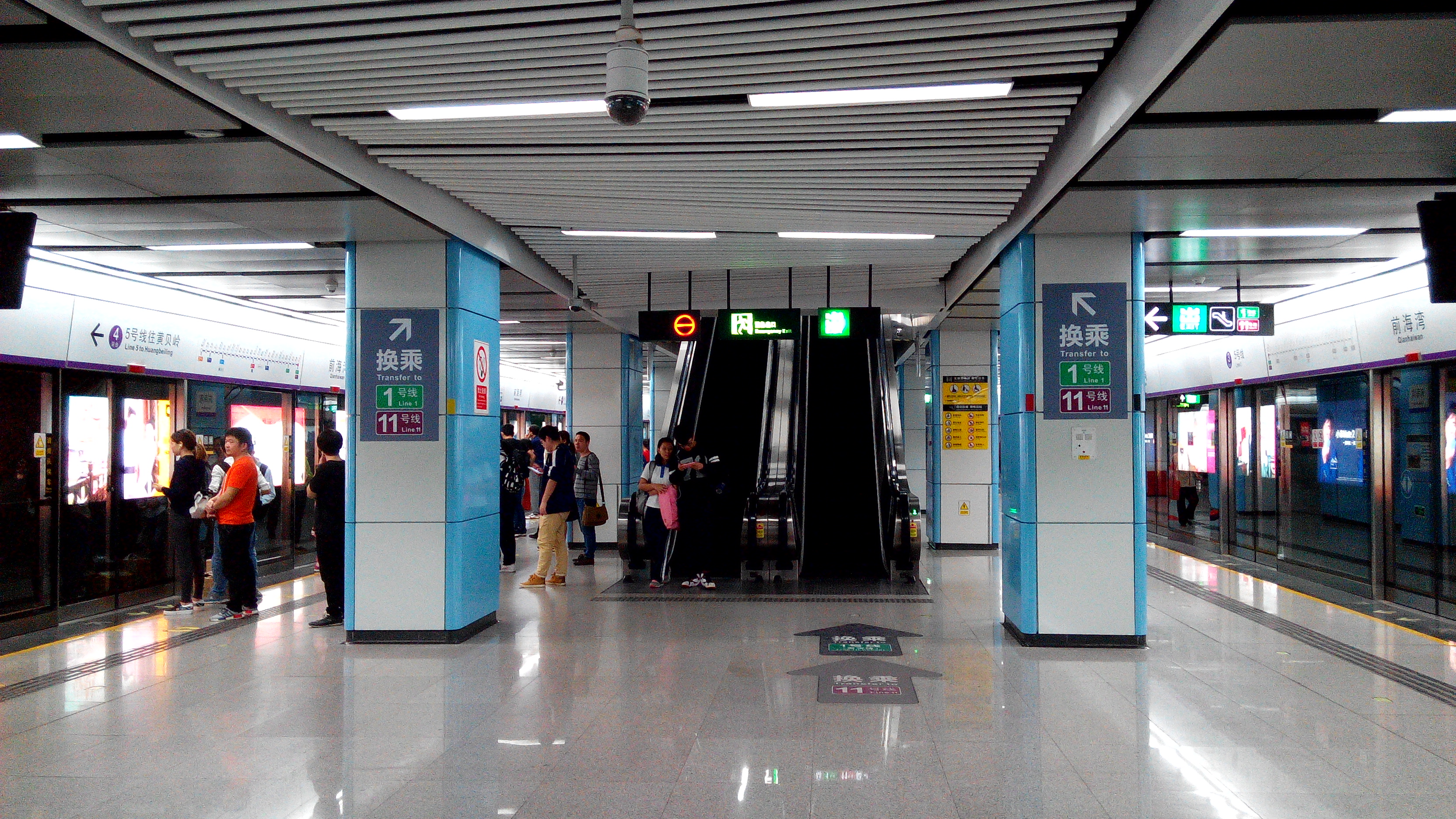
- Line 5 platform

Chinese name
- Traditional Chinese: 前海灣
- Simplified Chinese: 前海湾
Transcriptions
Standard Mandarin
- Hanyu Pinyin: Qián Hái Wān
Yue: Cantonese
- Jyutping: Cin4 Hoi2 Waan1

General information
- Location: Nanshan District, Shenzhen, Guangdong; China
- Coordinates: 22°32′19″N 113°54′11″E
- Operated by: SZMC (Shenzhen Metro Group)
- Lines: Line 1; Line 5; Line 11
- Platforms: 6 (2 island platforms and 2 side platforms)
- Tracks: 6

Construction
- Structure type: Underground
- Accessible: Yes

Other information
- Station code: 109 (Line 1); 508 (Line 5); 1111 (Line 11)

History
- Opened: Line 1: 15 June 2011 (15 years ago); Line 5: 22 June 2011 (15 years ago); Line 11: 28 June 2016 (10 years ago)

Services
Preceding station	Shenzhen Metro	Following station
Xin'an towards Airport East	Line 1	Liyumen towards Luohu
Linhai towards Grand Theater	Line 5	Guiwan towards Chiwan
Bao'an towards Bitou	Line 11	Nanshan towards Hongling South
Route map
B2F
- †Not for Scale
Location

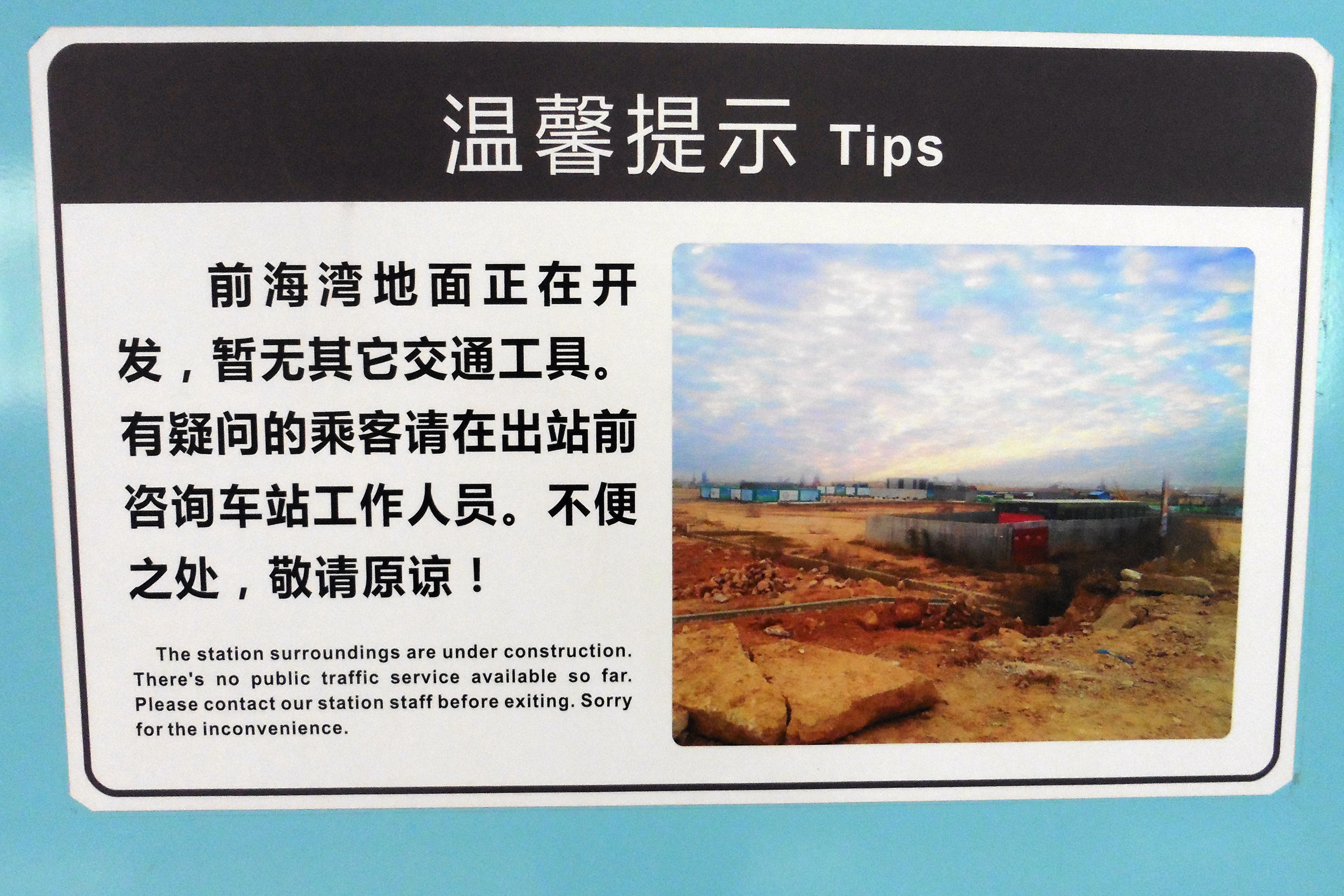
This station is only opened as an interchange between three lines, and the only open station exit at ground level (Exit B2) leads to the centre of huge construction site.

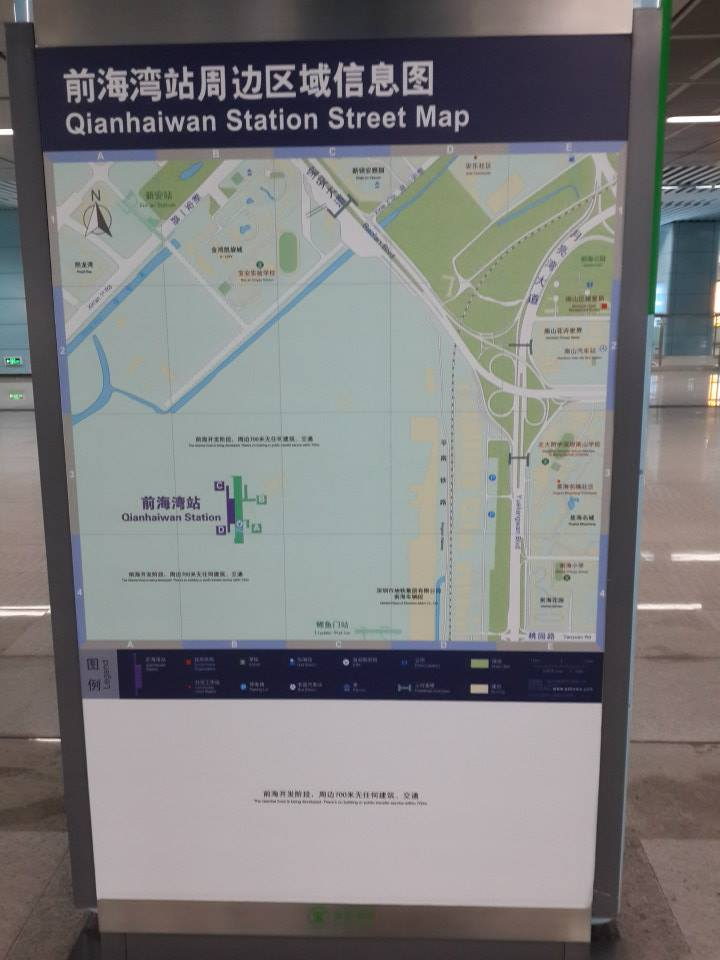
A map showing the lack of surroundings.

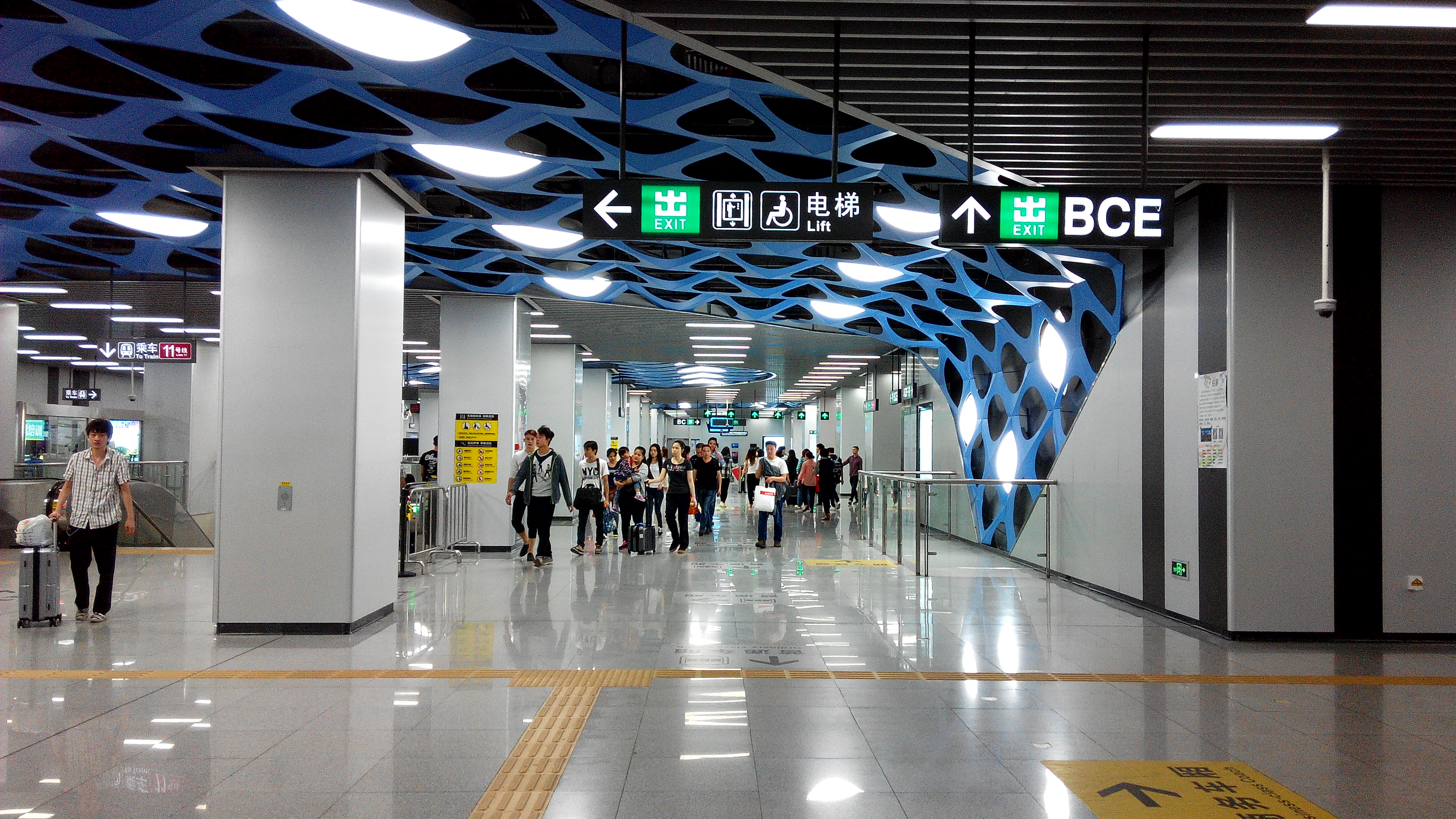
Line 11 concourse.

Qianhaiwan station (simplified Chinese: 前海湾站; traditional Chinese: 前海灣站; pinyin: Qiánháiwān Zhàn; Jyutping: Cin4 Hoi2 Waan1 Zaam6) is a station on Line 1, Line 5 and Line 11 of the Shenzhen Metro in Shenzhen, Guangdong Province, China. Line 1 platforms opened on 15 June 2011, Line 5 platforms opened on 22 June 2011, and Line 11 platforms opened on 28 June 2016. Qianhaiwan Station is located under Chenwen Road in Shenzhen's Nanshan District.

== Station layout ==
G	–	Exits
B1F; Concourse	Lobby	Ticket machines, customer service, shops, vending machines, transfer passage between Line 1, Line 5, and Line 11
B2F; Platforms
B2F; Platforms	Platform	1 towards Airport East (Xin'an)
B2F; Platforms	Island platform; doors will open on the left
B2F; Platforms	Platform	1 towards Luohu (Liyumen)
B2F; Platforms	Platform	5 towards Grand Theater (Linhai)
B2F; Platforms	Island platform; doors will open on the left
B2F; Platforms	Platform	5 towards Chiwan (Guiwan)
B2F; Platforms	Platform	11 towards Bitou (Bao'an)
B2F; Platforms	Island platform; doors will open on the left
B2F; Platforms	Platform	11 towards Hongling South (Nanshan)

== Exits ==
Exit		Destination
Exit A		Chenwen Road (E), 7th Road (N)
Exit B	B1	Chenwen Road (E), 9th Road (S)
Exit B	B2	Chenwen Road (E), 9th Road (N)
Exit C		Chenwen Road (W)
Exit D		Chenwen Road (W)
Exit E		
Exit F		
