= Bao'an Center station =

Metro station in Shenzhen, Guangdong, China

Coordinates: 22°33′17″N 113°53′13″E

Bao'an Center 宝安中心
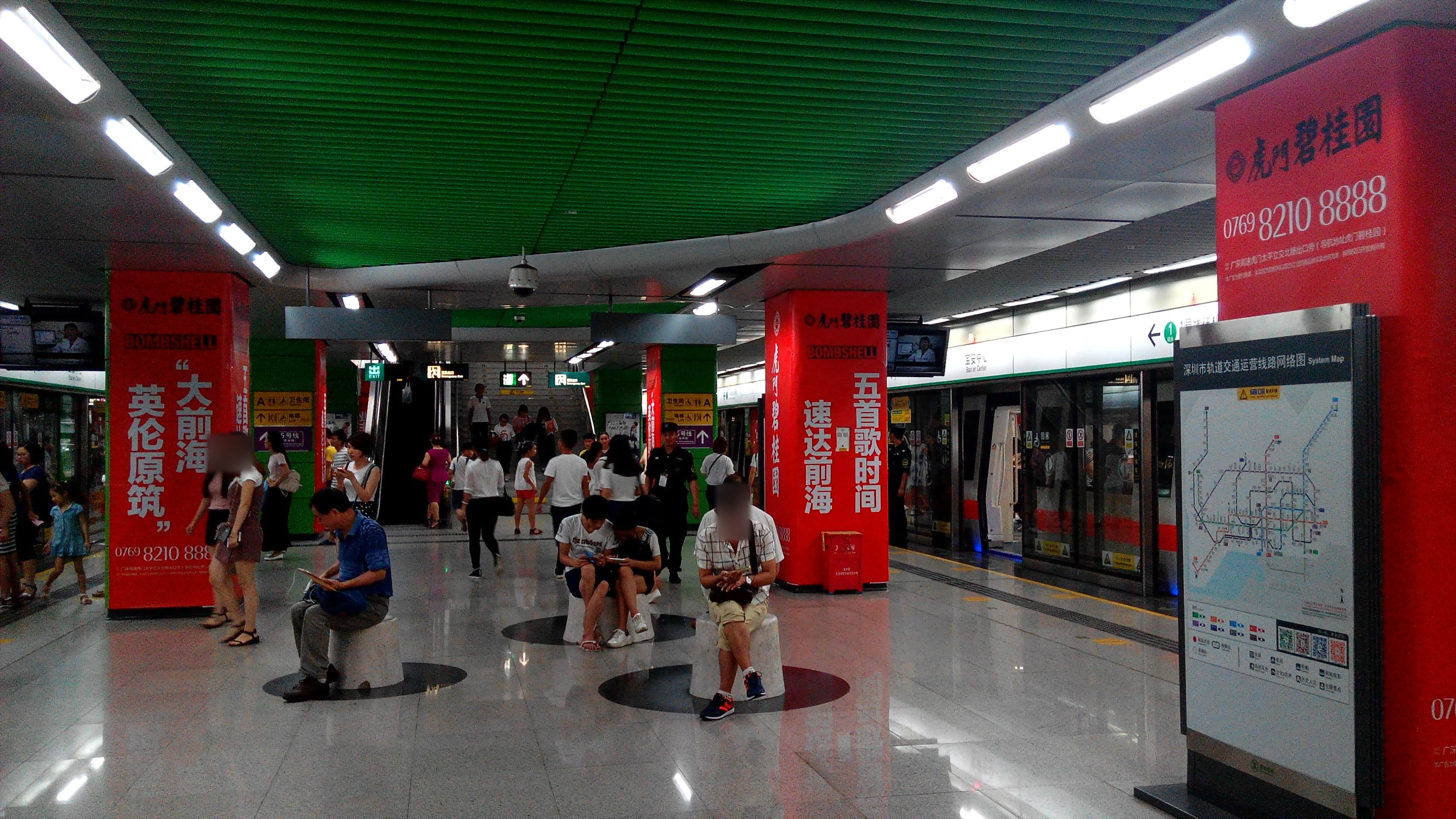
- Interior of Bao'an Centre Station

Chinese name
- Traditional Chinese: 寶安中心
- Simplified Chinese: 宝安中心
Transcriptions
Standard Mandarin
- Hanyu Pinyin: Bǎo'ān Zhōngxīn
Yue: Cantonese
- Jyutping: Bou2On1 Zung1Sam1

General information
- Location: Bao'an District, Shenzhen, Guangdong; China
- Operated by: SZMC (Shenzhen Metro Group)
- Lines: Line 1; Line 5
- Platforms: 4 (1 island platform and 2 side platforms)
- Tracks: 4

Construction
- Structure type: Underground
- Accessible: Yes

Other information
- Station code: 107 (Line 1); 511 (Line 5)

History
- Opened: Line 1: 15 June 2011 (15 years ago); Line 5: 22 June 2011 (15 years ago)

Services
Preceding station	Shenzhen Metro	Following station
Bao'an Stadium towards Airport East	Line 1	Xin'an towards Luohu
Fanshen towards Grand Theater	Line 5	Baohua towards Chiwan
Route map
B2F
B3F
Location

Bao'an Center station (simplified Chinese: 宝安中心站; traditional Chinese: 寶安中心站; pinyin: Bǎo'ān Zhōngxīn Zhàn; Jyutping: Bou2 On1 Zung1 Sam1 Zaam6), also spelled Bao'an Centre station, is an underground station on Line 1 and Line 5 of the Shenzhen Metro in Shenzhen, Guangdong Province, China. Line 1 platforms opened on 15 June 2011, and Line 5 platforms opened on 22 June 2011.

== Station layout ==
G	-	Exit
B1F; Concourse	Lobby	Customer service, shops, vending machines, ATMs, transfer passage between Line 1 and Line 5
B2F; Platforms	Platform 1	← 1 towards Airport East (Bao'an Stadium)
B2F; Platforms	Island platform, doors will open on the left
B2F; Platforms	Platform 2	1 towards Luohu (Xin'an) →
B3F; Platforms	Side platform, doors will open on the right
B3F; Platforms	Platform 3	← 5 towards Chiwan (Baohua)
B3F; Platforms	Platform 4	5 towards Grand Theater (Fanshen) →
B3F; Platforms	Side platform, doors will open on the left

== Exits ==
Exit	Destination
Exit A	Xinhu Road (N), Haiwang Middle School
Exit B	Chuangye 1st Road (S), Hongfa Central Building, AEON Bao'an Center Store
Exit C	Chuangye 1st Road (N), Binhai Primary School
Exit D	Xinhu Road (N), Fenglinzhou, Sky Palace, Bus Station of Bao'an Center
Exit E	Xinhu Road (S), Bao'an District Committee of Shenzhen Municipal Committee of the CPC, Shenzhen Bao'an District People's Government, Haibin Square
Exit F	Xinhu Road (W), Chuangye 1st Road (S), International Business Tower, Bao'an Center
