= Xingwei station =

Shenzhen Metro Line 12 station

Xingwei 兴围
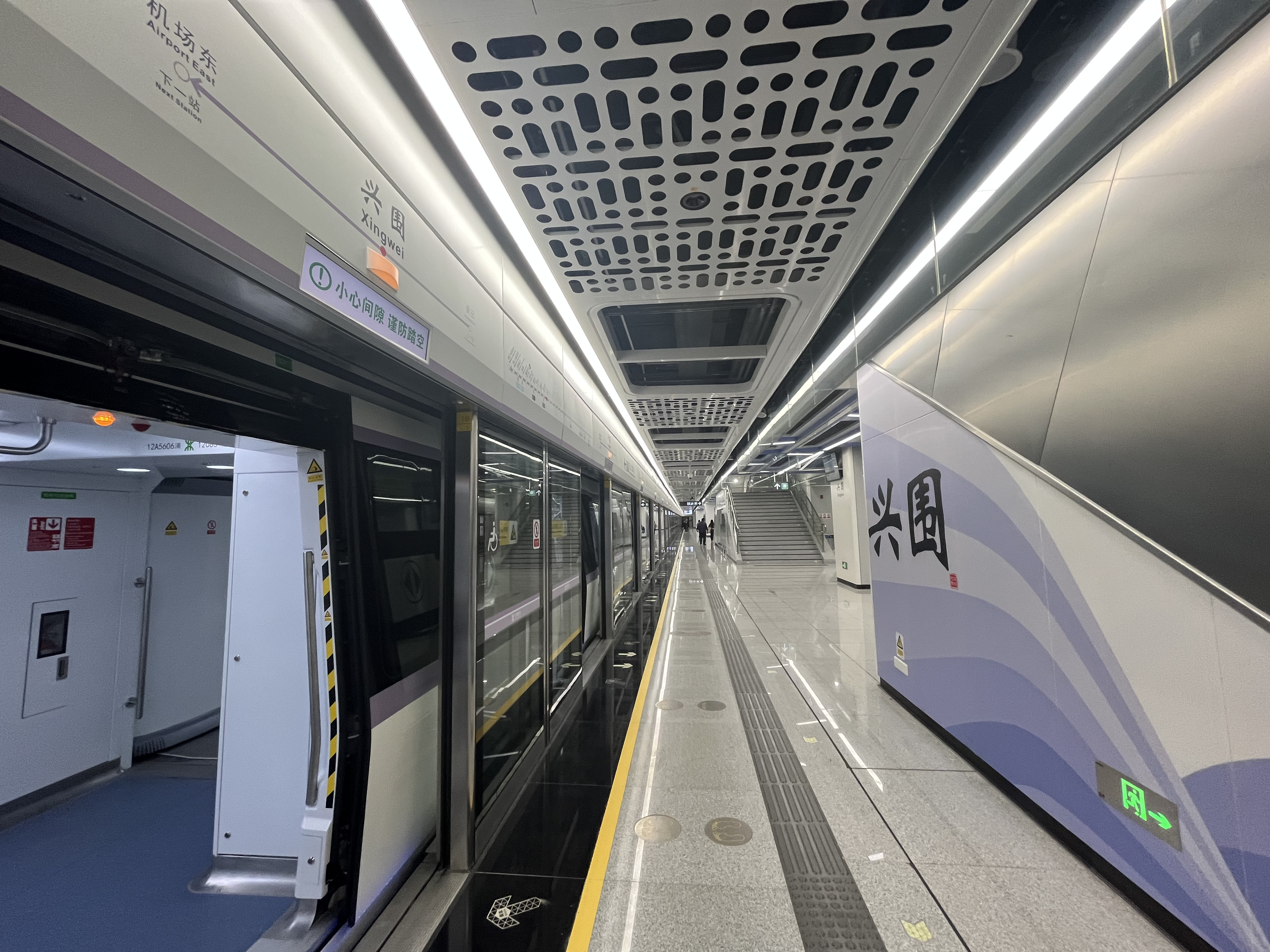
- Platform

Chinese name
- Traditional Chinese: 興圍
- Simplified Chinese: 兴围
Transcriptions
Standard Mandarin
- Hanyu Pinyin: Xīngwéi
Yue: Cantonese
- Yale Romanization: Hīngwài
- Jyutping: Hing1 Wai4

General information
- Location: Northeast side of the intersection of Guangshen Expressway and Xingwei Road; Bao'an District, Shenzhen, Guangdong; China
- Coordinates: 22°38′45.38″N 113°49′46.20″E
- Operated by: Shenzhen Line 12 Rail Transit Co., Ltd (Shenzhen Metro Group and PowerChina PPP)
- Line: Line 12
- Platforms: 2 (1 island platform)
- Tracks: 2

Construction
- Structure type: Underground
- Accessible: Yes

History
- Opened: 28 November 2022 (3 years ago)

Services
Preceding station	Shenzhen Metro	Following station
Airport East towards Songgang	Line 12	Huangtian towards Zuopaotai East
Location

Xingwei station (simplified Chinese: 兴围; traditional Chinese: 興圍; pinyin: Xīngwéi; Cantonese Yale: Hīngwài) is a metro station on Line 12 of Shenzhen Metro. It opened on 28 November 2022.

== Station layout ==
The station has an island platform under Guangshen Expressway.

G	–	Exits A-D
B1F; Concourse	Lobby	Ticket Machines, Customer Service, Automatic Vending Machines
B2F; Platforms	Platform	12 towards Songgang (Airport East)
B2F; Platforms	Island platform, doors will open on the left
B2F; Platforms	Platform	12 towards Zuopaotai East (Huangtian)

=== Entrances/exits ===
The station has 4 points of entry/exit.

Exit	Destination
Exit A	Guangshen Expressway (E)
Exit B	Guangshen Expressway (N)
Exit C	Guangshen Expressway (W), Star Airlines Huafu, Rainbow Shopping Mall
Exit D	Guangshen Expressway (W), Shenzhen Star Aviation Center, Yifung Hotel Xingwei, Rainbow Shopping Mall

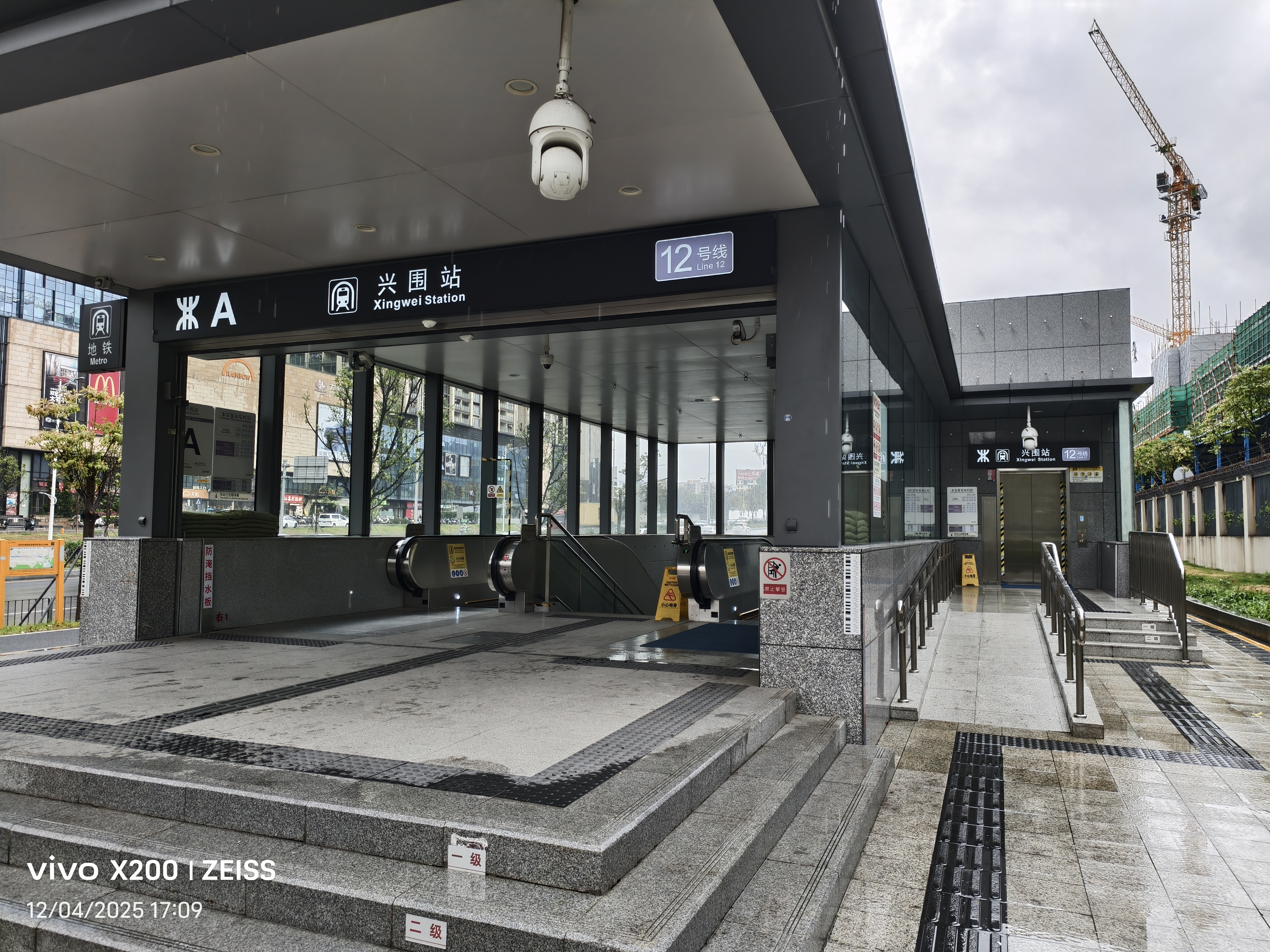
Entrance A

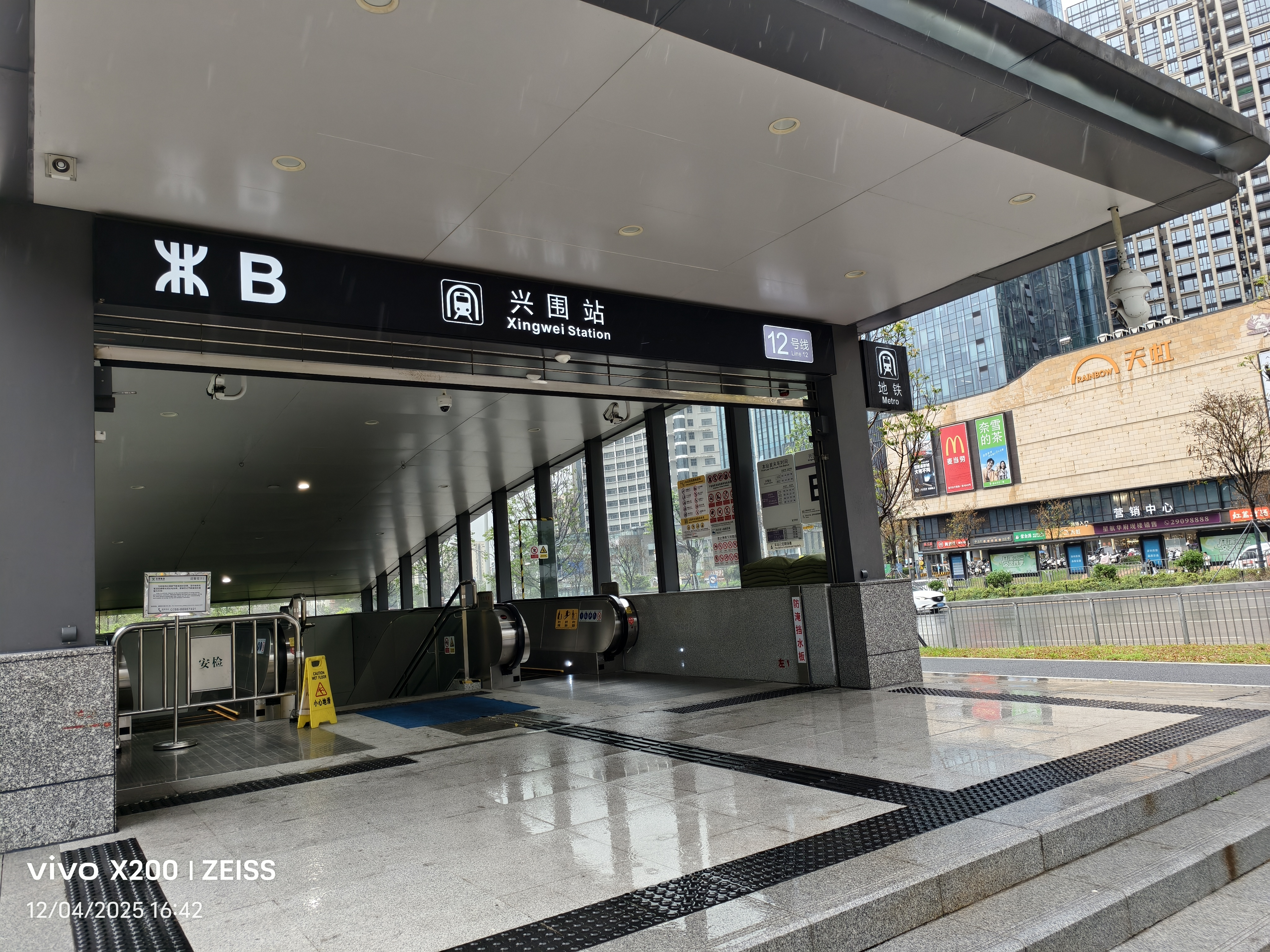
Entrance B

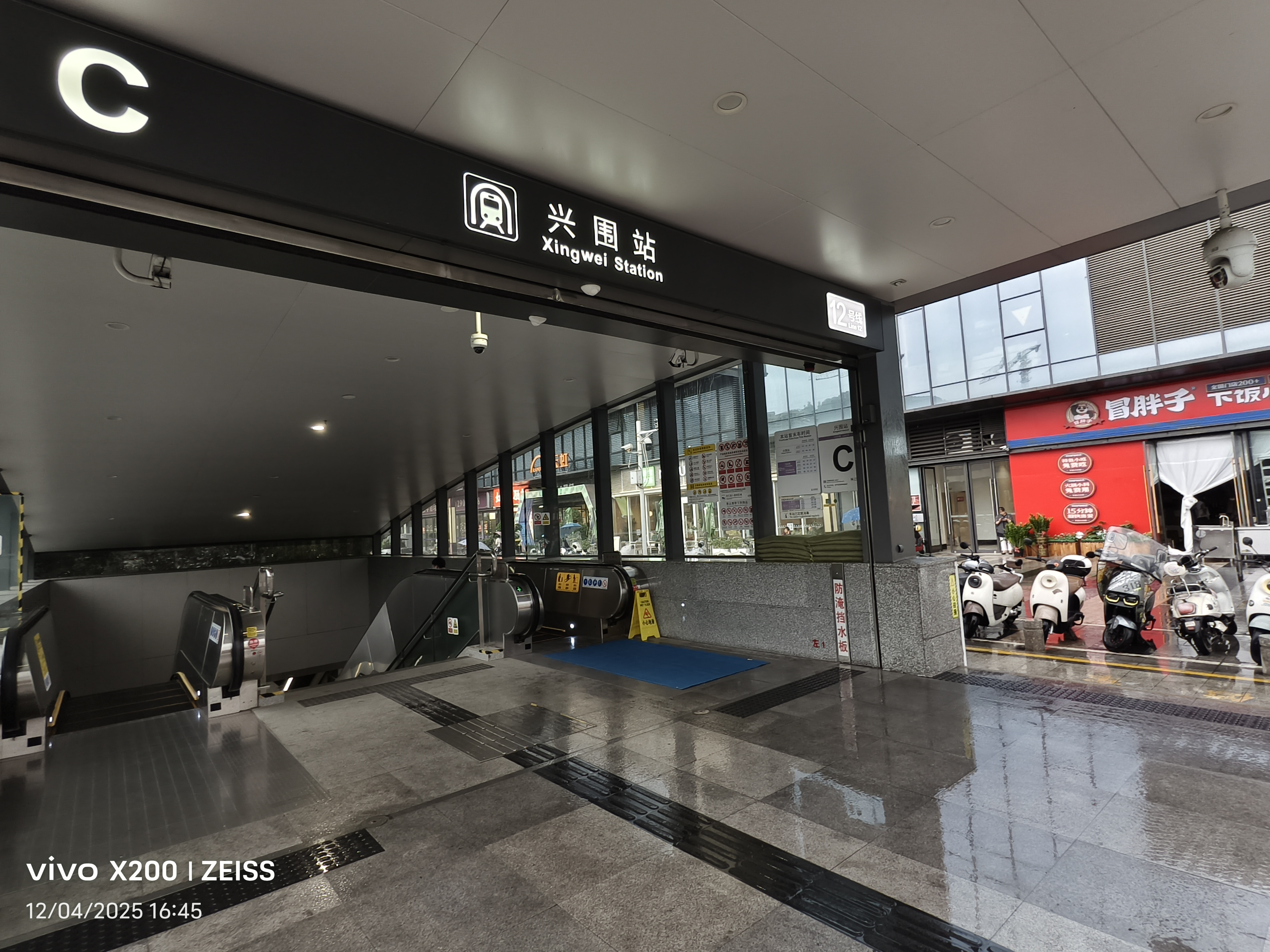
Entrance C

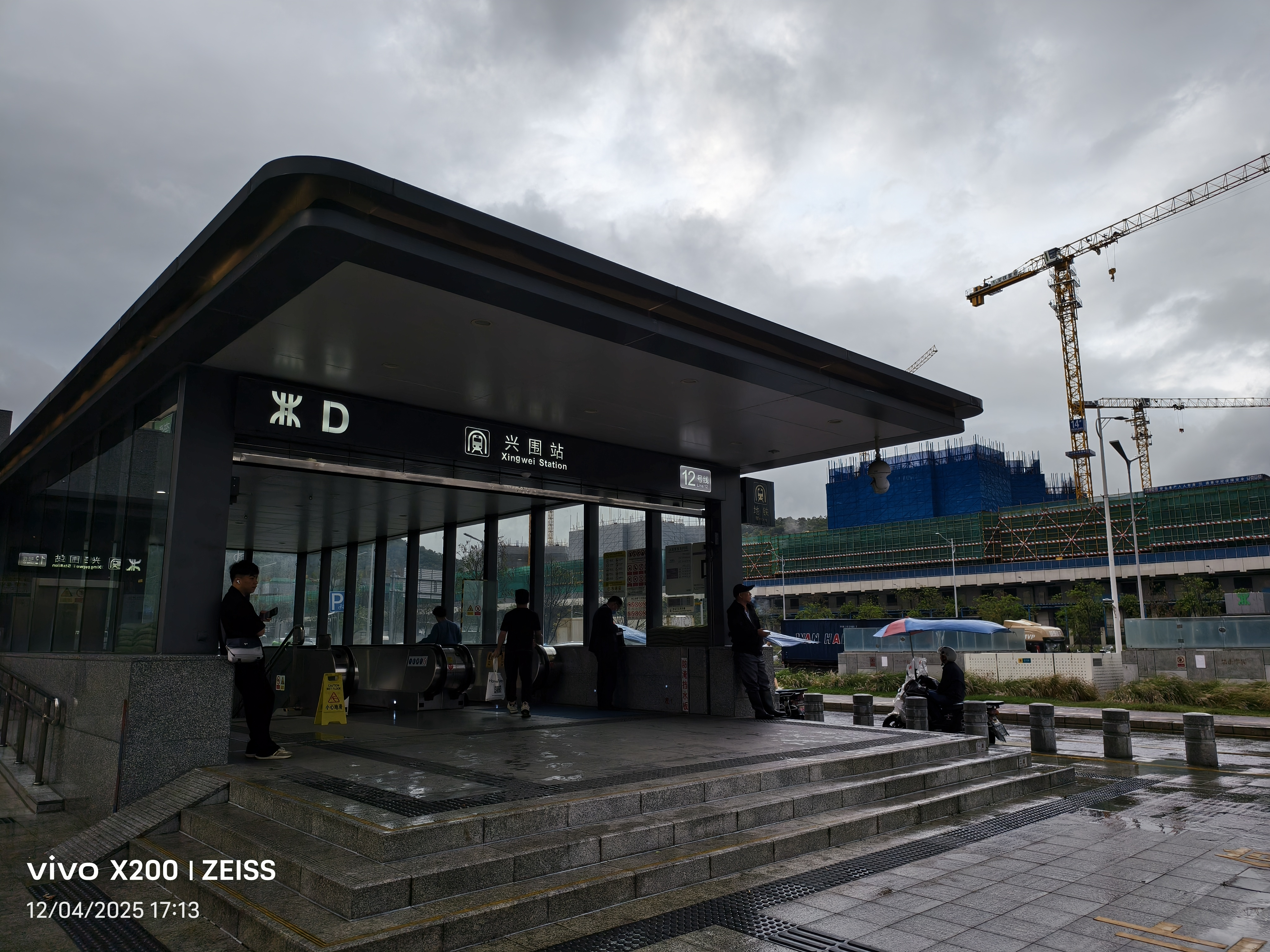
Entrance D
