= Huangtian station =

Shenzhen Metro Line 12 station

Huangtian 黄田
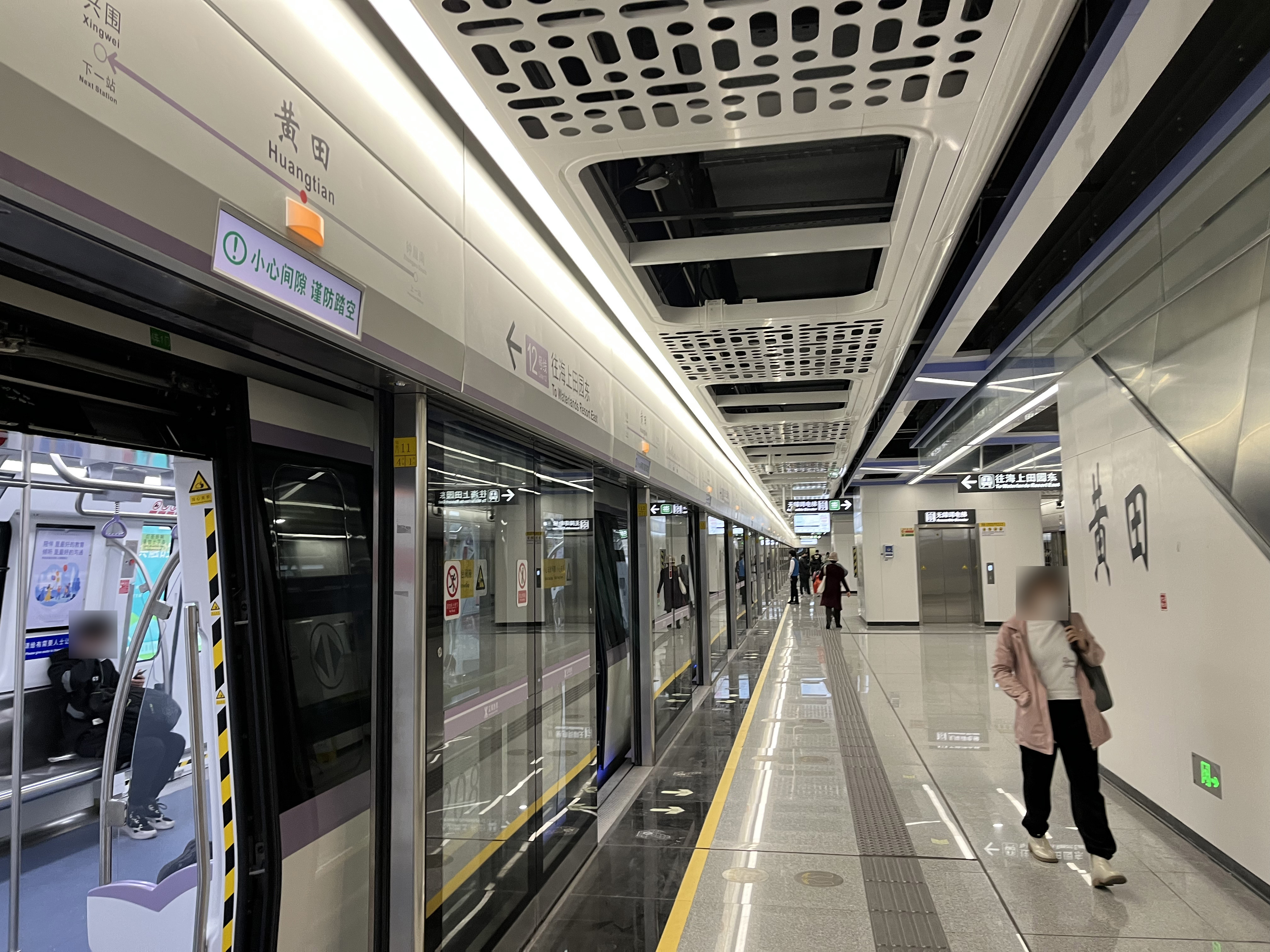
- Platform (towards Songgang)

Chinese name
- Chinese: 黄田
Transcriptions
Standard Mandarin
- Hanyu Pinyin: Huángtián
Yue: Cantonese
- Yale Romanization: Wòngtìn
- Jyutping: Wong4 Tin4

General information
- Location: East side of the intersection of Guangshen Expressway and Kaicheng 2nd Road; Bao'an District, Shenzhen, Guangdong; China
- Coordinates: 22°38′2.18″N 113°50′24.58″E
- Operated by: Shenzhen Line 12 Rail Transit Co., Ltd (Shenzhen Metro Group and PowerChina PPP)
- Line: Line 12
- Platforms: 4 (2 island platforms)
- Tracks: 3

Construction
- Structure type: Underground
- Accessible: Yes

History
- Opened: 28 November 2022 (3 years ago)

Services
Preceding station	Shenzhen Metro	Following station
Xingwei towards Songgang	Line 12	Zhongwu South towards Zuopaotai East
Location

Huangtian station (Chinese: 黄田; pinyin: Huángtián; Cantonese Yale: Wòngtìn) is a metro station on Line 12 of Shenzhen Metro. It opened on 28 November 2022.

== Station layout ==
The station has a double island platform under Guangshen Expressway.

G	–	Exits A-D
B1F; Concourse	Lobby	Ticket Machines, Customer Service, Automatic Vending Machines
B2F; Platforms	Platform	12 towards Songgang (Xingwei)
B2F; Platforms	Island platform, doors will open on the left or right
B2F; Platforms	Platform	12 termination platform 12 towards Zuopaotai East (Zhongwu South)
B2F; Platforms	Island platform, doors will open on the left
B2F; Platforms	Platform	12 towards Zuopaotai East (Zhongwu South)

=== Entrances/exits ===
The station has 4 points of entry/exit.

Exit	Destination
Exit A	Unopened
Exit B	Unopened
Exit C	Guangshen Expressway (W), Huangtian Institute of Bao'an Market Supervision and Administration Bureau, Huangtian Park, Hangcheng Sub-district Office, Huangtian Primary School, Shenzhen Bao'an District Central Hospital Hangcheng Community Hospital
Exit D	Guangshen Expressway (W)
