= Qianwan Park station =

Metro station in Shenzhen, Guangdong, China

Coordinates: 22°31′46″N 113°59′6″E

Qianwan Park 前湾公园
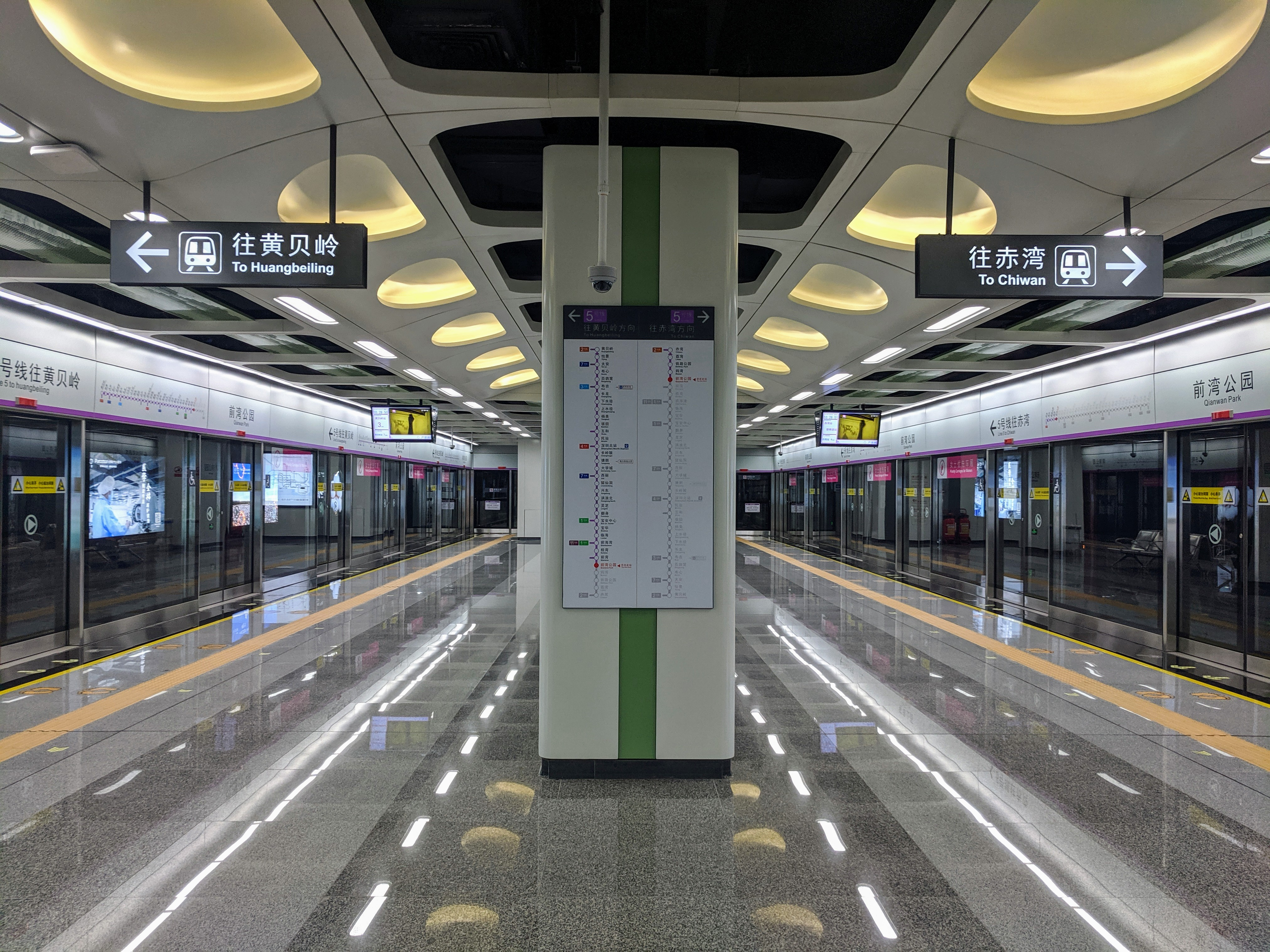

General information
- Location: Nanshan District, Shenzhen, Guangdong; China
- Operated by: SZMC (Shenzhen Metro Group)
- Line: Line 5
- Platforms: 2 (1 island platform)
- Tracks: 2

Construction
- Structure type: Underground
- Accessible: Yes

History
- Opened: 28 September 2019

Services
Preceding station	Shenzhen Metro	Following station
Qianwan towards Grand Theater	Line 5	Mawan towards Chiwan
Location

Qianwan Park station (Chinese: 前湾公园站; pinyin: Qiánwān Gōngyuán Zhàn; Jyutping: cin^{4} waan^{1} gung^{1} jyun^{4} zaam^{6}) is a station of Line 5 of the Shenzhen Metro. It opened on 28 September 2019.

== Station layout ==
G	-	Exit
B1F; Concourse	Lobby	Customer Service, Shops, Vending machines, ATMs
B2F; Platforms	Platform	← Line 5 towards Chiwan (Mawan)
B2F; Platforms	Island platform, doors will open on the left
B2F; Platforms	Platform	→ Line 5 towards Grand Theater (Qianwan) →

== Exits ==
Exit	Destination
Exit A	North Side of Qianhai 4th Road (E), East Side of Tinghai Boulevard (S)
Exit C	Guangzhou-Shenzhen Expressway along the river, South Side of Qianhai 3rd Road (W), West Side of Tinghai Boulevard (N)
