= Jihe Expressway =

Road in Shenzhen, China

Jihe Expressway
- 沈阳－海口高速公路
- 机荷高速公路
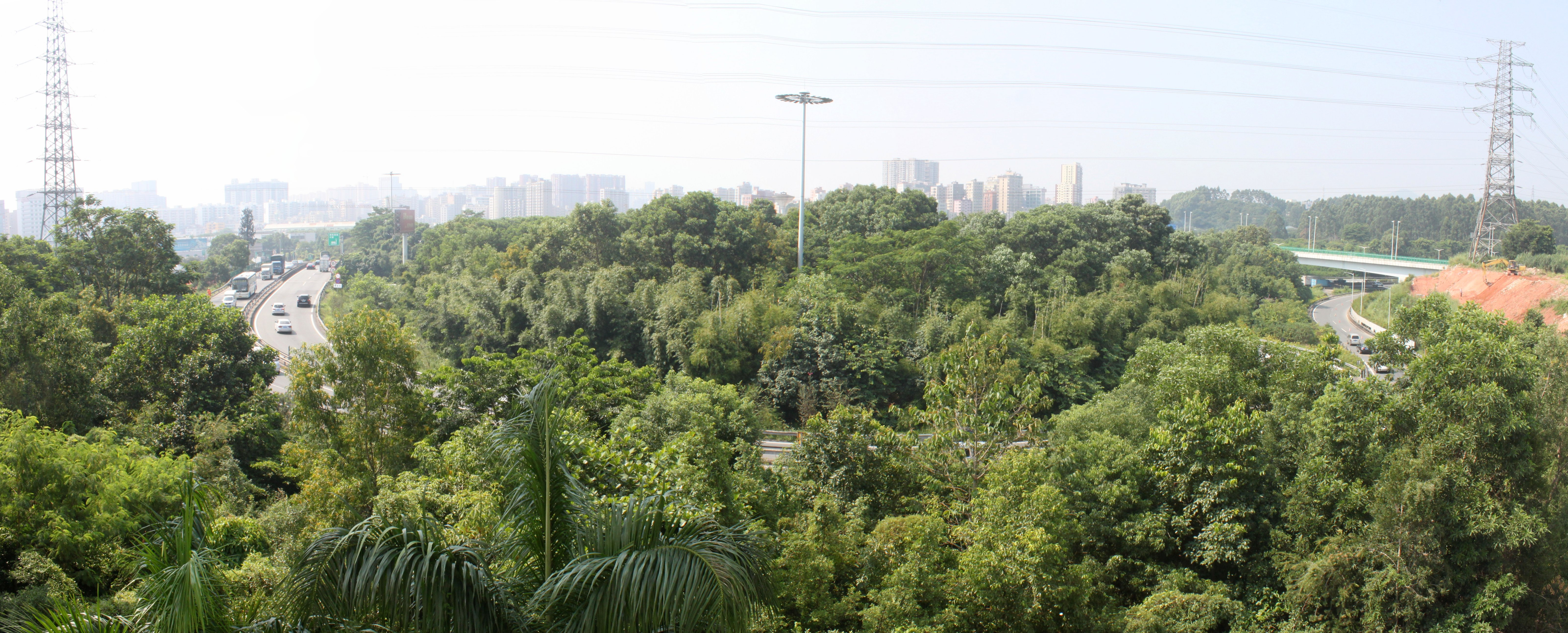
- Jihe Expressway

Route information
- Length: 44.31 km (27.53 mi)
- Existed: December 1997–present

Location
- Country: China

Highway system
- National Trunk Highway System; Primary; Auxiliary; National Highways; Transport in China

Jihe Expressway (simplified Chinese: 机荷高速公路; traditional Chinese: 機荷高速公路; pinyin: Jīhé Gāosù Gōnglù) is a 44.31-kilometre-long (27.53 mi) Chinese ring expressway that connects Bao'an International Airport and He'ao Community of Longgang District in Shenzhen, Guangdong, China. It connects to the Shenzhen-Shantou Expressway, Huizhou-Yantian Expressway, G205, Meilin-Guanlan Expressway, Guangzhou-Shenzhen-Zhuhai Expressway, G107, Guangzhou-Foshan Expressway, and the Foshan-Kaiyang Expressway.

== History ==
Built from December 1995 to May 1999, it is 44.31 kilometres (27.53 mi) long. The first section of the expressway opened in the east of Shenzhen on 31 December 1997, from Fumin Community (福民社区) of Bao'an District to He'ao Community (荷坳社区) of Longgang District. And the second section of the expressway opened in the west of Shenzhen in May 1999, from Bao'an International Airport to Fumin Community.
