= Railway Park station =

Metro station in Shenzhen, Guangdong, China

Coordinates: 22°31′46″N 113°59′6″E

Railway Park 铁路公园
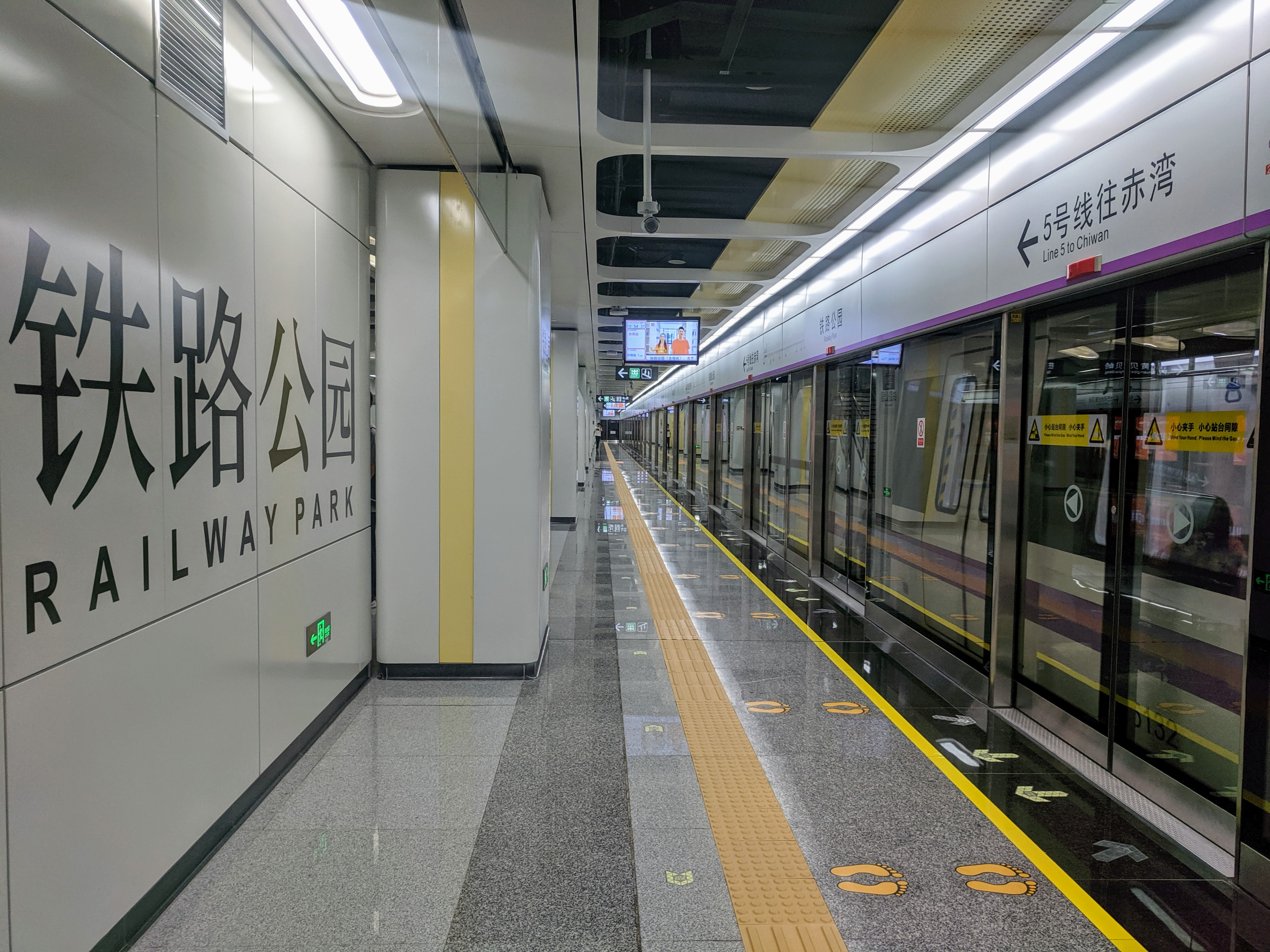

General information
- Location: Interchange of Baimao Street and Gangcheng Street, Nanshan Subdistrict, Nanshan District, Shenzhen, Guangdong; China
- Operated by: SZMC (Shenzhen Metro Group)
- Line: Line 5
- Platforms: 2 (1 island platform)
- Tracks: 2

Construction
- Structure type: Underground
- Accessible: Yes

History
- Opened: 28 September 2019

Services
Preceding station	Shenzhen Metro	Following station
Mawan towards Grand Theater	Line 5	Liwan towards Chiwan
Location

Railway Park station (Chinese: 铁路公园站; pinyin: Tiělù Gōngyuán Zhàn) is a station of Line 5 of the Shenzhen Metro. It opened on 28 September 2019.

== Station layout ==
G	-	Exit
B1F; Concourse	Lobby	Customer Service, Shops, Vending machines, ATMs
B2F; Platforms	Platform	← Line 5 towards Chiwan (Liwan)
B2F; Platforms	Island platform, doors will open on the left
B2F; Platforms	Platform	→ Line 5 towards Grand Theater (Mawan) →

== Exits ==
Exit	Destination
Exit A	Xiangjiang Financial Center, China Offshore Oil Station
Exit B	Haichengwei Logistics
Exit C	Shekou Customs, Qianhai Free Trade Tower, Xiangbin International Financial Centre
Exit D	SF Express Headquarters Building, Shimao Qianhai Center, Xinlikang E-commerce Building
