= Pingluan Hill station =

Shenzhen Metro Line 12 station

Pingluan Hill 平峦山
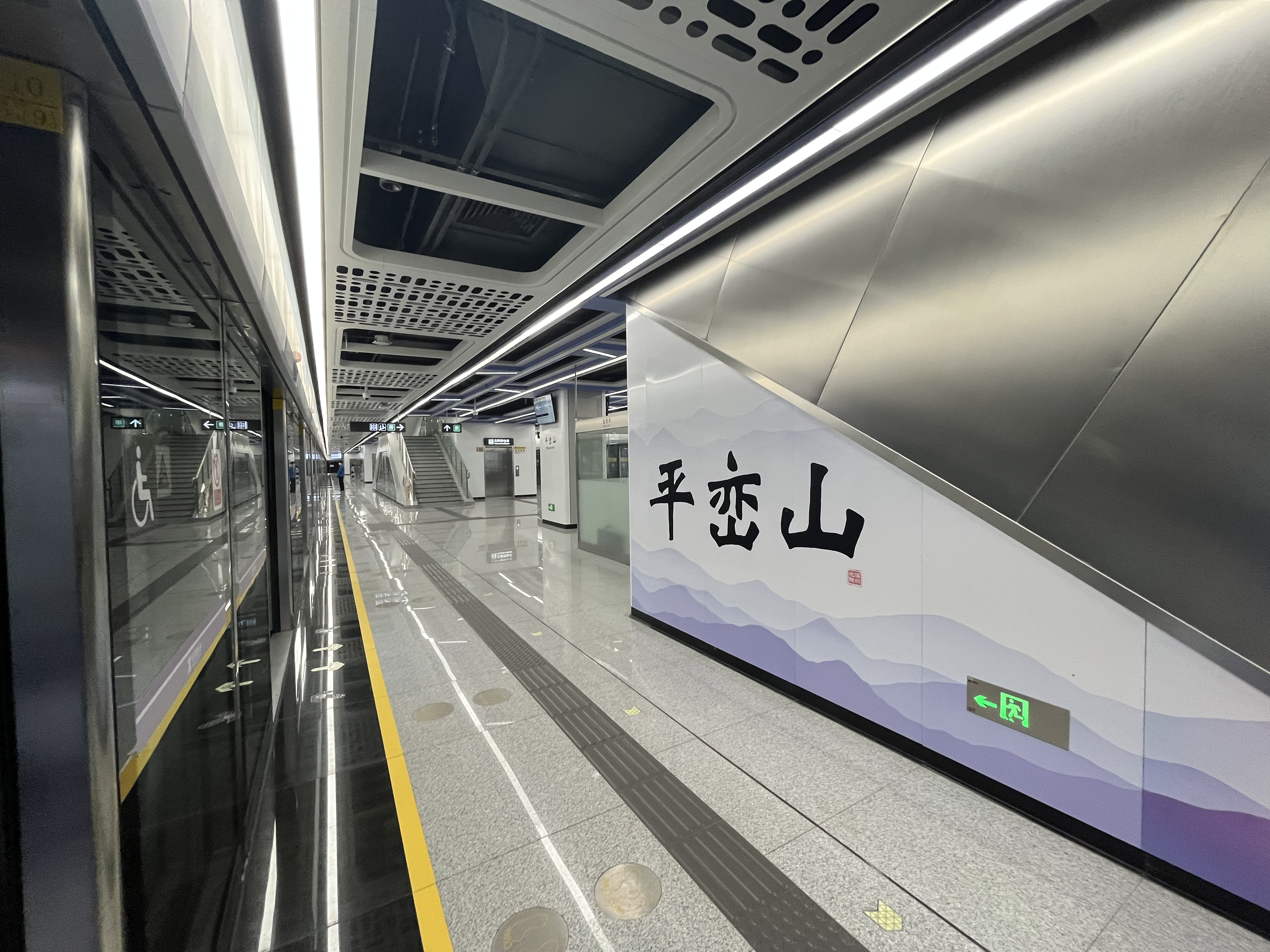
- Platform

Chinese name
- Traditional Chinese: 平巒山
- Simplified Chinese: 平峦山
Transcriptions
Standard Mandarin
- Hanyu Pinyin: Píngluán Shān
Yue: Cantonese
- Yale Romanization: Pìngleuhn Sāan
- Jyutping: Ping4 Lun4 Saan1

General information
- Location: 300 meters north of the intersection of Qianjin 2nd Road and Baotian 3rd Road; Bao'an District, Shenzhen, Guangdong; China
- Coordinates: 22°36′23.22″N 113°51′53.21″E
- Operated by: Shenzhen Line 12 Rail Transit Co., Ltd (Shenzhen Metro Group and PowerChina PPP)
- Line: Line 12
- Platforms: 2 (1 island platform)
- Tracks: 2

Construction
- Structure type: Underground
- Accessible: Yes

History
- Opened: 28 November 2022 (3 years ago)

Services
Preceding station	Shenzhen Metro	Following station
Xixiang Taoyuan towards Songgang	Line 12	Baotian 1st Road towards Zuopaotai East
Location

Pingluan Hill station (simplified Chinese: 平峦山; traditional Chinese: 平巒山; pinyin: Píngluán Shān; Cantonese Yale: Pìngleuhn Sāan) is a metro station on Line 12 of Shenzhen Metro. It opened on 28 November 2022.

== Station layout ==
The station has an island platform under Qianjin 2nd Road.

G	–	Exits A-C
B1F; Concourse	Lobby	Ticket Machines, Customer Service, Automatic Vending Machines
B2F; Platforms	Platform	12 towards Songgang (Xixiang Taoyuan)
B2F; Platforms	Island platform, doors will open on the left
B2F; Platforms	Platform	12 towards Zuopaotai East (Baotian 1st Road)

=== Entrances/exits ===
The station has 4 points of entry/exit.

Terminal sign	Exit	Elevator	Guidance	Nearby
出口 A		N/A	East side of Qianjin 2nd Road（SOUTH）	Pingluan Park
出口 B			East side of Qianjin 2nd Road（NORTH）	Xixiang Experimental School, Baoan Pure Traditional Chinese Medicine Treatment Hospital
出口 C			West side of Qianjin 2nd Road（NORTH）	Xinji Longjiang Pork Knuckle Rice, Garden Industrial Park
Note: Elevator | Escalators | Restrooms
