= Liwan station =

Metro station in Shenzhen, China

Coordinates: 22°31′46″N 113°59′6″E

Liwan 荔湾
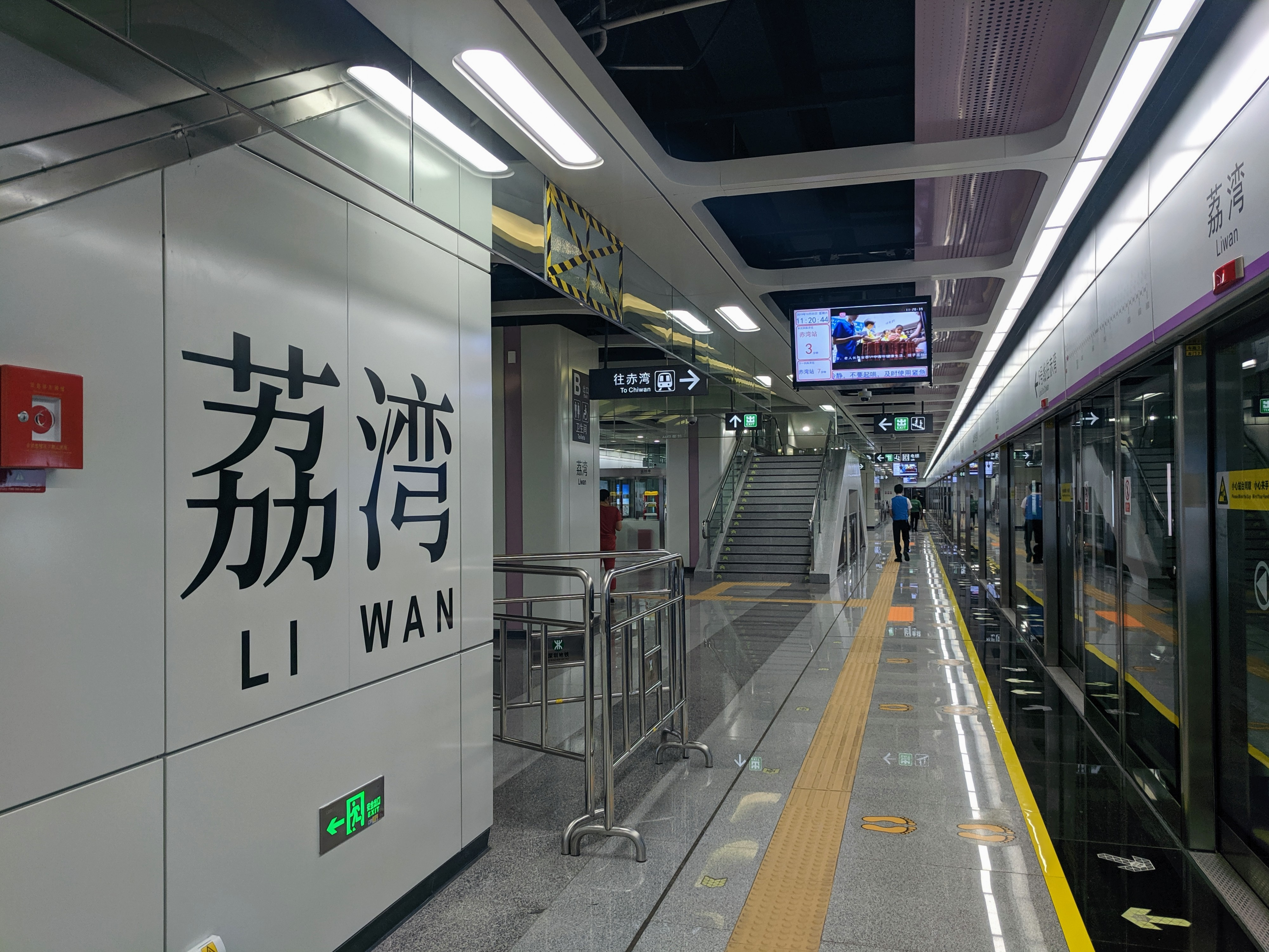

General information
- Location: Nanshan District, Shenzhen, Guangdong; China
- Operator: SZMC (Shenzhen Metro Group)
- Line: Line 5
- Platforms: 2 (1 island platform)
- Tracks: 2

Construction
- Structure type: Underground
- Accessible: Yes

History
- Opened: 28 September 2019

Services
Preceding station	Shenzhen Metro	Following station
Railway Park towards Grand Theater	Line 5	Chiwan Terminus
Location

Liwan station (Chinese: 荔湾站; pinyin: Lìwān Zhàn) is a station of Line 5 of the Shenzhen Metro. It opened on 28 September 2019.

== Station layout ==
G	-	Exit
B1F; Concourse	Lobby	Customer Service, Shops, Vending machines, ATMs
B2F; Platforms	Platform	Line 5 towards Chiwan (Terminus)→
B2F; Platforms	Island platform, doors will open on the left
B2F; Platforms	Platform	← Line 5 towards Grand Theater (Railway Park)

== Exits ==
Exit	Destination
Exit A	China Construction Second Engineering Bureau, Second Branch, Hanjing Queyue, Qianhai Harbour Garden, Liwan Building, Shenzhen University Normal College Middle School(Senior School ), Kaisa Qianhai Square, Guanfengge, Oceanwide Lafei Garden Phase 2, Lafei City Square, Mawan Police Office, Hengyu Ziyuan, Qianhai Xinghai Crossing Bus Station
Exit B	Oceanwide Lafei Garden Phase I, Hengli Xinhaiwan Garden, Sunshine Rose Garden, The Affiliated High School of Shenzhen University, Yueliangwan Park, Yujingyuan, Nanshan Garden, Nanshan Garden Bus Station, Evergreen Resort（transfer for bus）
Exit C	Liwan Primary School, Yueliangwan Boulevard
