= Xixiang Taoyuan station =

Shenzhen Metro Line 12 station

Xixiang Taoyuan 西乡桃源
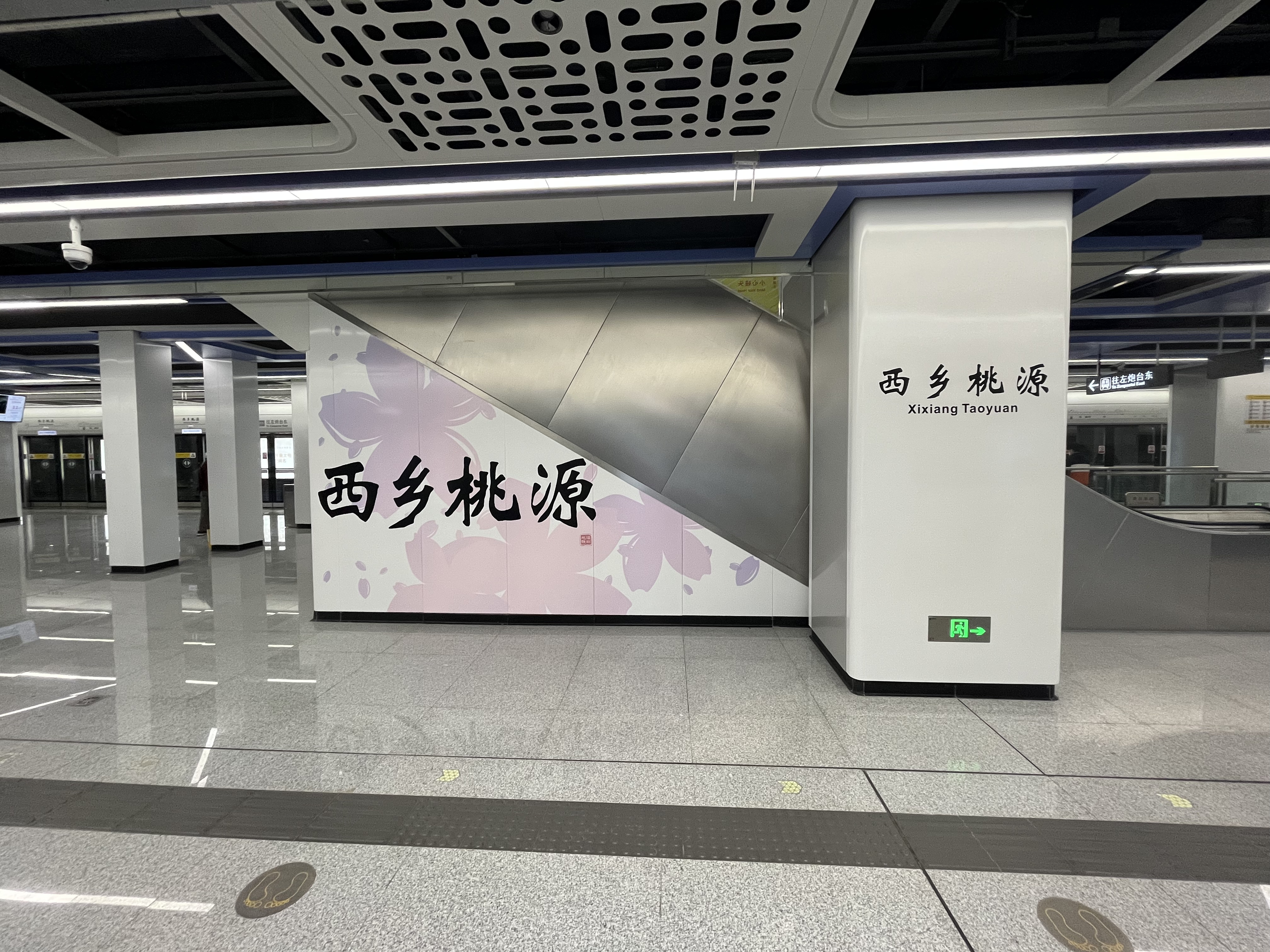
- Calligraphy

Chinese name
- Traditional Chinese: 西鄉桃源
- Simplified Chinese: 西乡桃源
Transcriptions
Standard Mandarin
- Hanyu Pinyin: Xīxīang Táoyuán
Yue: Cantonese
- Yale Romanization: Sāihēung Tohyùhn
- Jyutping: Sai1 Hoeng1 Tou4 Jyun4

General information
- Location: Intersection of Qianjin 2nd Road and Hangcheng Avenue; Xixiang Subdistrict, Bao'an District, Shenzhen, Guangdong; China
- Coordinates: 22°36′50.72″N 113°51′26.42″E
- Operator: Shenzhen Line 12 Rail Transit Co., Ltd (Shenzhen Metro Group and PowerChina PPP)
- Line: Line 12
- Platforms: 2 (1 island platform)
- Tracks: 2

Construction
- Structure type: Underground
- Accessible: Yes

History
- Opened: 28 November 2022 (3 years ago)

Services
Preceding station	Shenzhen Metro	Following station
Zhongwu South towards Songgang	Line 12	Pingluan Hill towards Zuopaotai East
Location

Xixiang Taoyuan station (simplified Chinese: 西乡桃源站; traditional Chinese: 西鄉桃源站; pinyin: Xīxīang Táoyuán Zhàn; Cantonese Yale: Sāihēung Tohyùhn Jaahm) is a metro station on Line 12 of Shenzhen Metro. It opened on 28 November 2022.

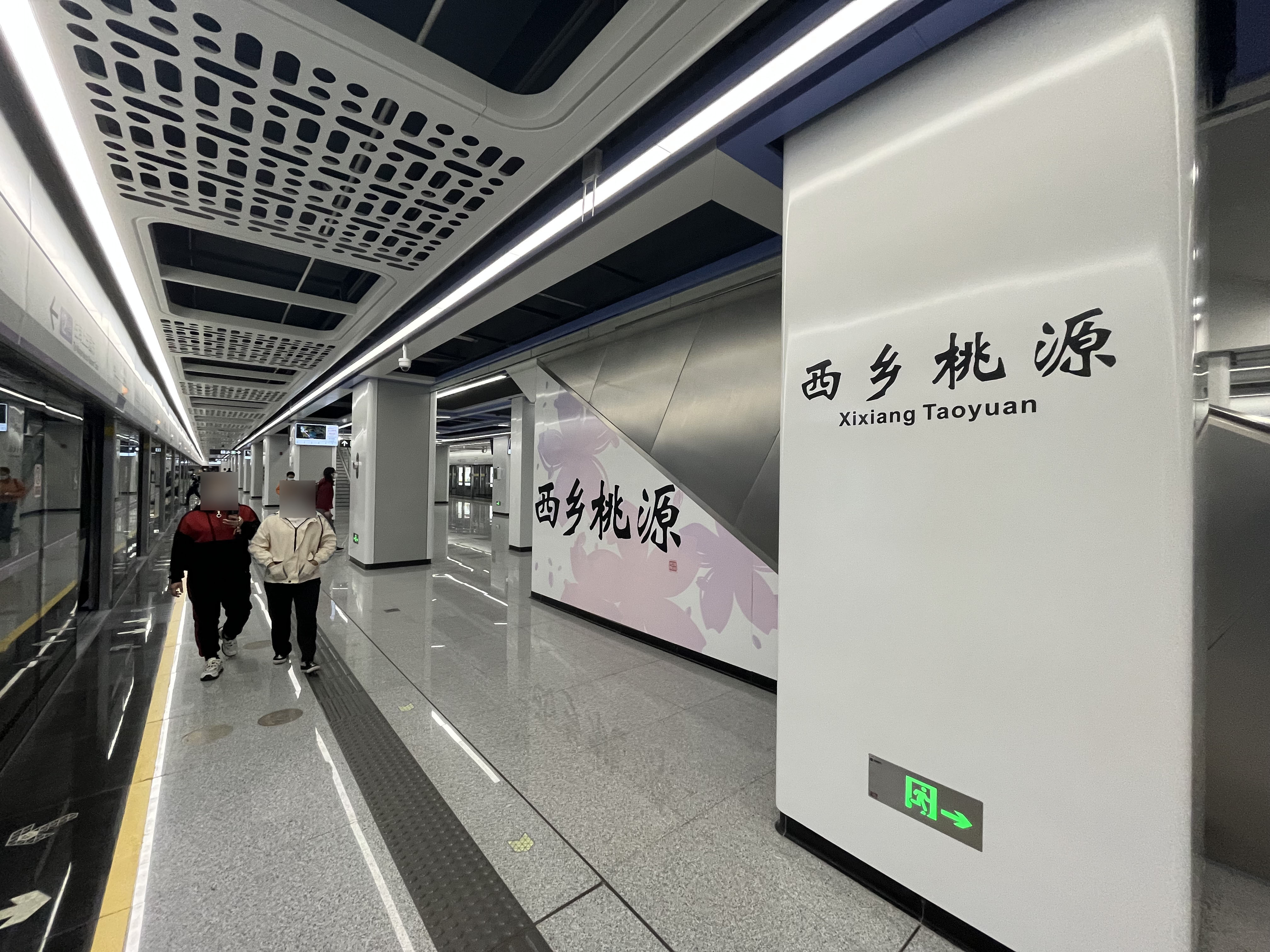
Platform

== Station layout ==
The station has an island platform under Qianjin 2nd Road.

G	–	Exits A-C
B1F; Concourse	Lobby	Ticket Machines, Customer Service, Station Control Room
B2F; Platforms	Platform	12 towards Songgang (Zhongwu South)
B2F; Platforms	Island platform, doors will open on the left
B2F; Platforms	Platform	12 towards Zuopaotai East (Pingluan Hill)

=== Entrances/exits ===
This station has 3 points of entry/exit, including elevators at Exits A and C, and toilets at Exit A.

Exit	Gallery	Elevator	Nearby
The ramp is located at the elevator			Qianjin 2nd Road Eest side（NORTH） North side of Zhoushi Road (WEST）
The ramp is located at the elevator		N/A	
出口 C			Qianjin 2nd Road West side（NORTH） North side of Zhoushi Road (WEST）
Note: Tactile Paved | Wheelchair Ramp | Elevator | Escalators | Restrooms
