= Zhongwu South station =

Shenzhen Metro Line 12 station

Zhongwu South 钟屋南
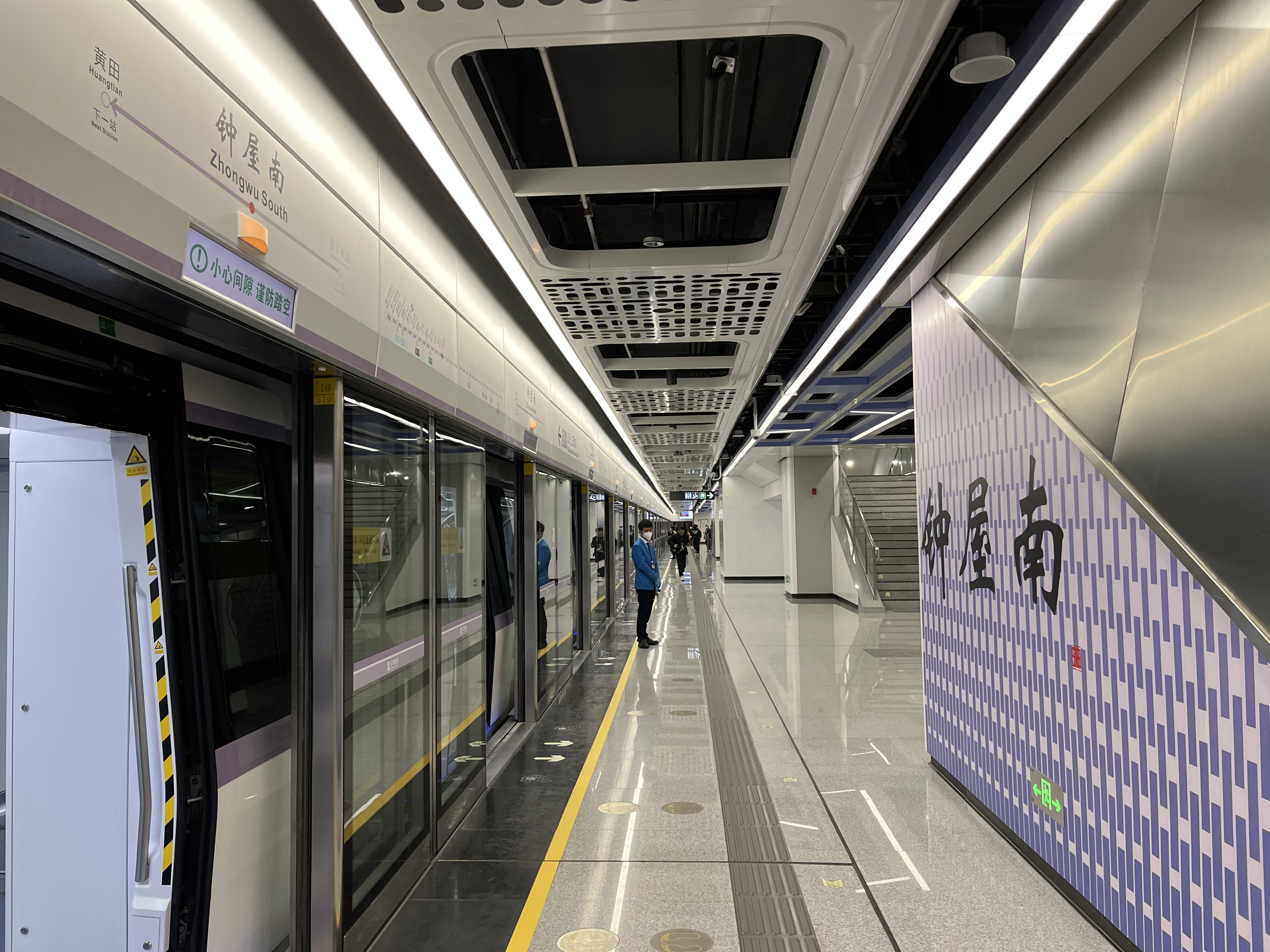
- Platform

Chinese name
- Traditional Chinese: 鐘屋南
- Simplified Chinese: 钟屋南
Transcriptions
Standard Mandarin
- Hanyu Pinyin: Zhōngwū Nán
Yue: Cantonese
- Yale Romanization: Jūngūk Nàahm
- Jyutping: Zung1 Nguk1 Namm4

General information
- Location: North side of the intersection of Qianjin 2nd Road and Zhoushi Road; Xixiang Subdistrict, Bao'an District, Shenzhen, Guangdong; China
- Coordinates: 22°37′18.52″N 113°51′14.80″E
- Operated by: Shenzhen Line 12 Rail Transit Co., Ltd (Shenzhen Metro Group and PowerChina PPP)
- Line: Line 12
- Platforms: 2 (1 island platform)
- Tracks: 2

Construction
- Structure type: Underground
- Accessible: Yes

History
- Opened: 28 November 2022 (3 years ago)

Services
Preceding station	Shenzhen Metro	Following station
Huangtian towards Songgang	Line 12	Xixiang Taoyuan towards Zuopaotai East
Location

Zhongwu South station (simplified Chinese: 钟屋南; traditional Chinese: 鐘屋南; pinyin: Zhōngwū Nán; Cantonese Yale: Jūngūk Nàahm) is a metro station on Line 12 of Shenzhen Metro. It opened on 28 November 2022.

== Station layout ==
The station has an island platform under Qianjin 2nd Road.

G	–	Exits A-E
B1F; Concourse	Lobby	Ticket Machines, Customer Service, Automatic Vending Machines
B2F; Platforms	Platform	12 towards Songgang (Huangtian)
B2F; Platforms	Island platform, doors will open on the left
B2F; Platforms	Platform	12 towards Zuopaotai East (Xixiang Taoyuan)

=== Entrances/exits ===
The station has 6 points of entry/exit, with Exits A and E2 being accessible via elevators. Exit B has a toilet.

Exit		Destination
Exit A		Qianjin 2nd Road (E), Zhoushi Road (N), Daxing Mercedes-Benz, Hezhou Industrial Zone
Exit B		Qianjin 2nd Road (E), Zhoushi Road (N), Daxing Mercedes-Benz, Hezhou Industrial Zone
Exit C		Qianjin 2nd Road (W), Zhoushi Road (N), Baoxing Smart City
Exit D		Qianjin 2nd Road (W), Zhoushi Road (N), Baoxing Smart City
Exit E	E1	Qianjin 2nd Road (E), Zhoushi Road (S), Taoyuan House (East District)
Exit E	E2	Qianjin 2nd Road (E), Zhoushi Road (S), Taoyuan House (West District)

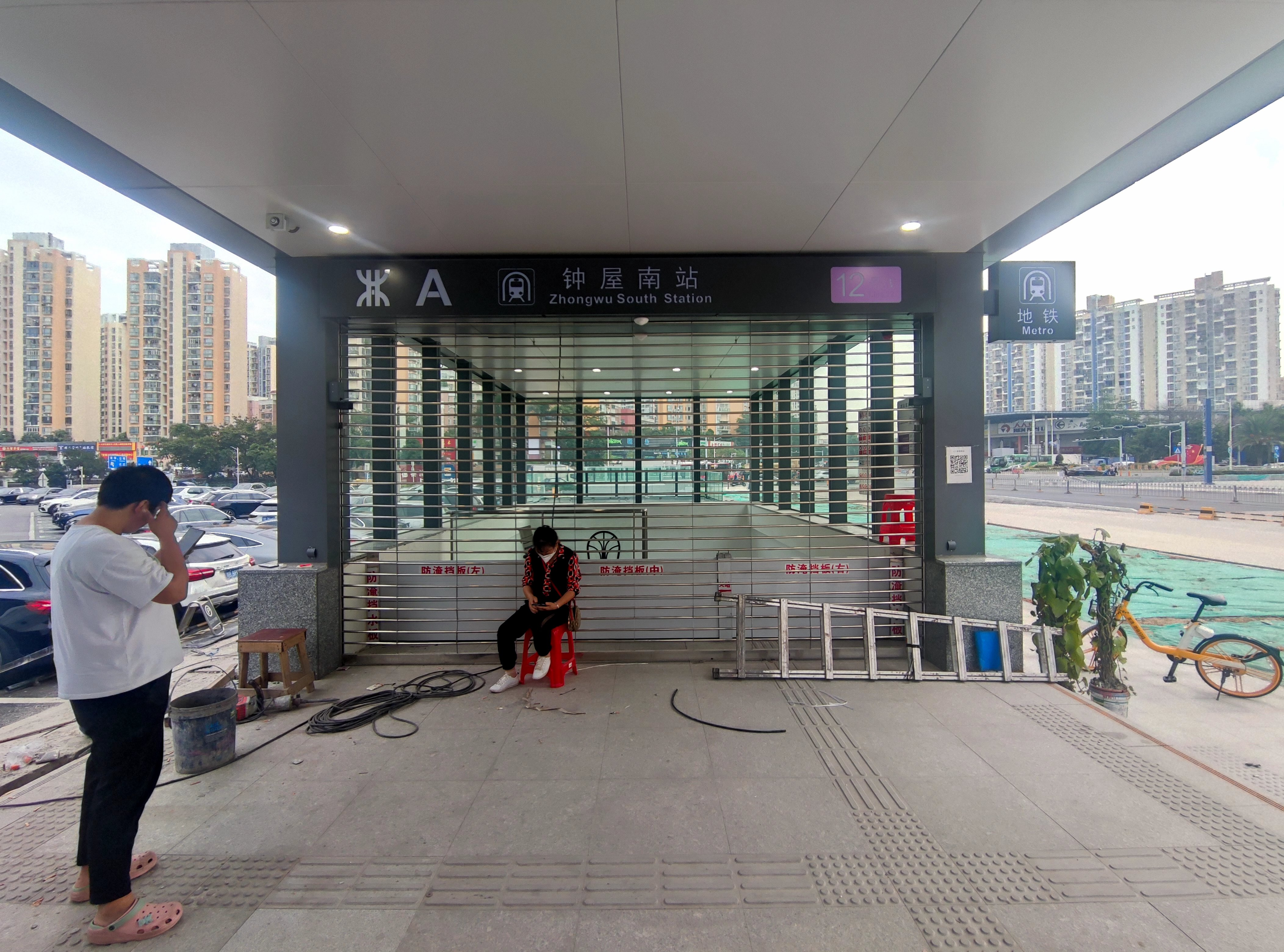
Entrance A

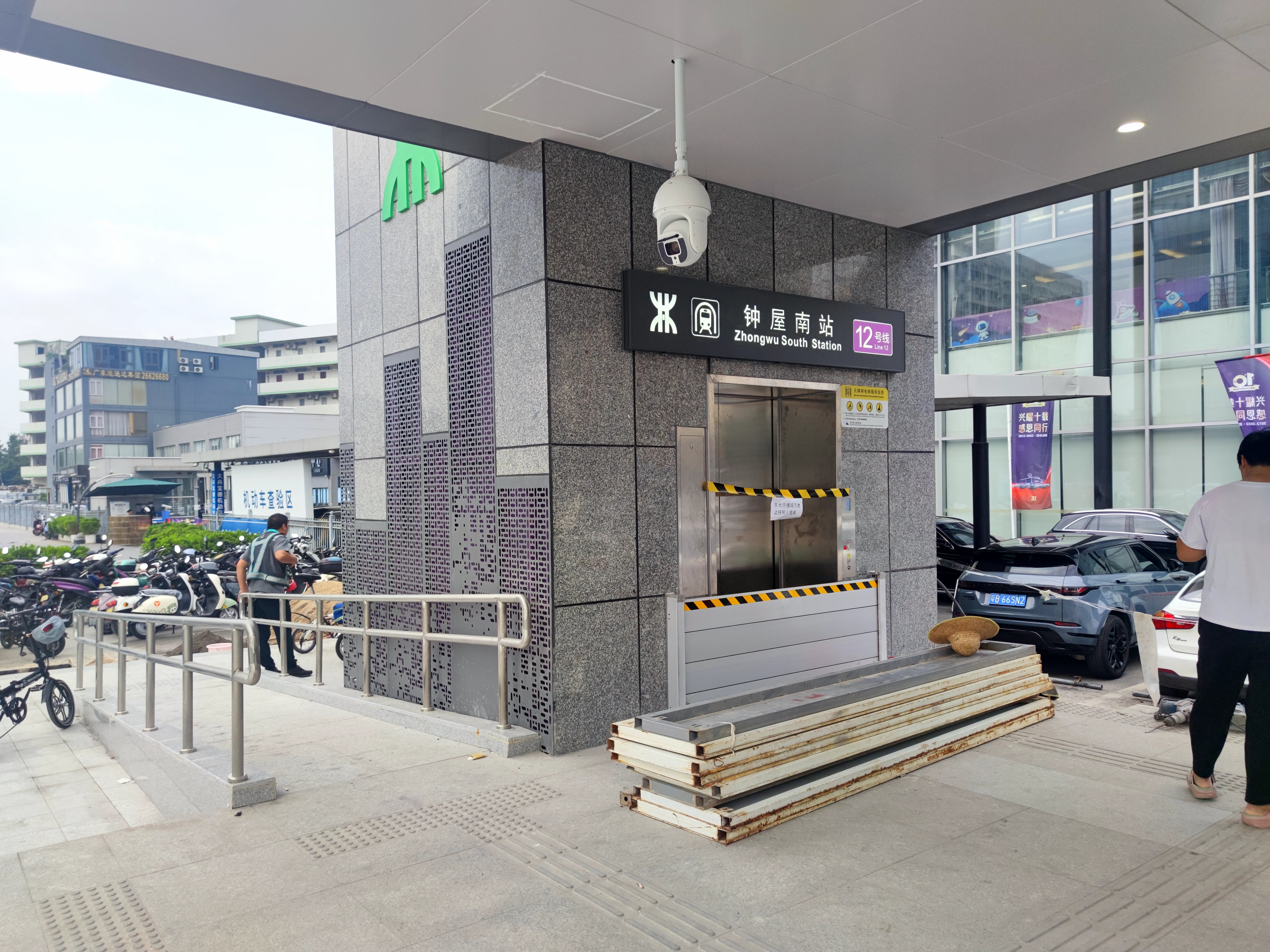
Entrance A (elevator entrance)

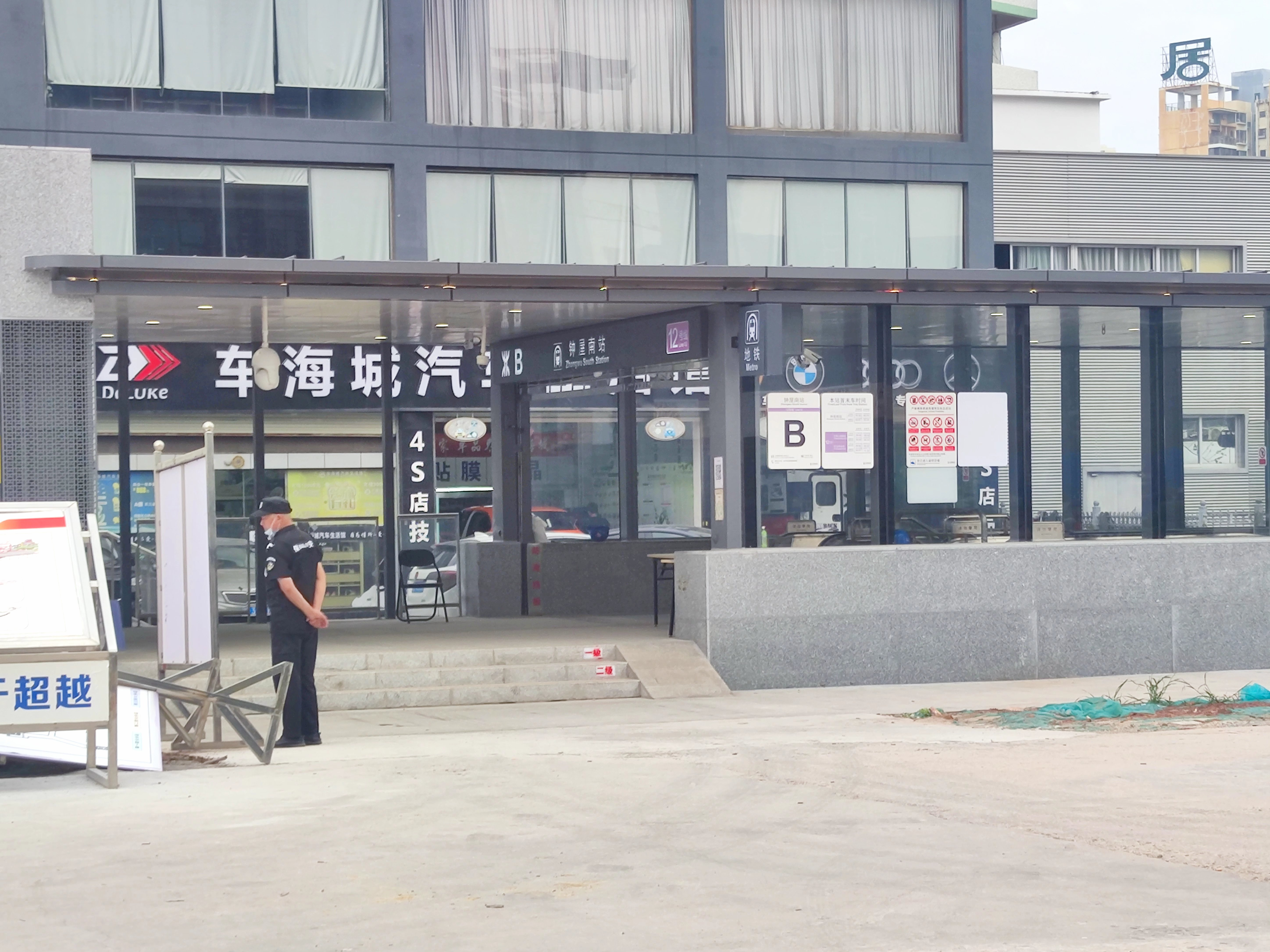
Entrance B

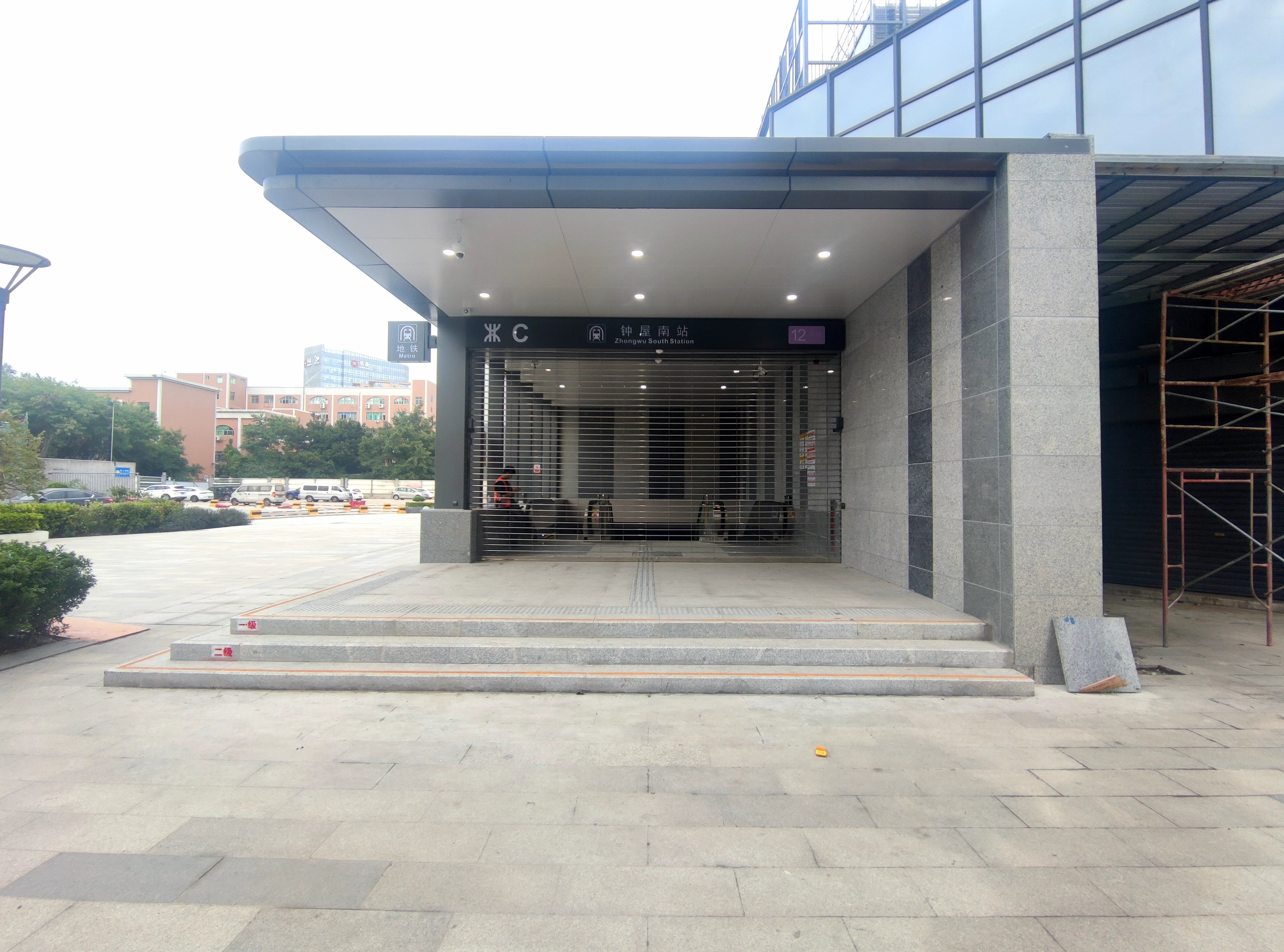
Entrance C

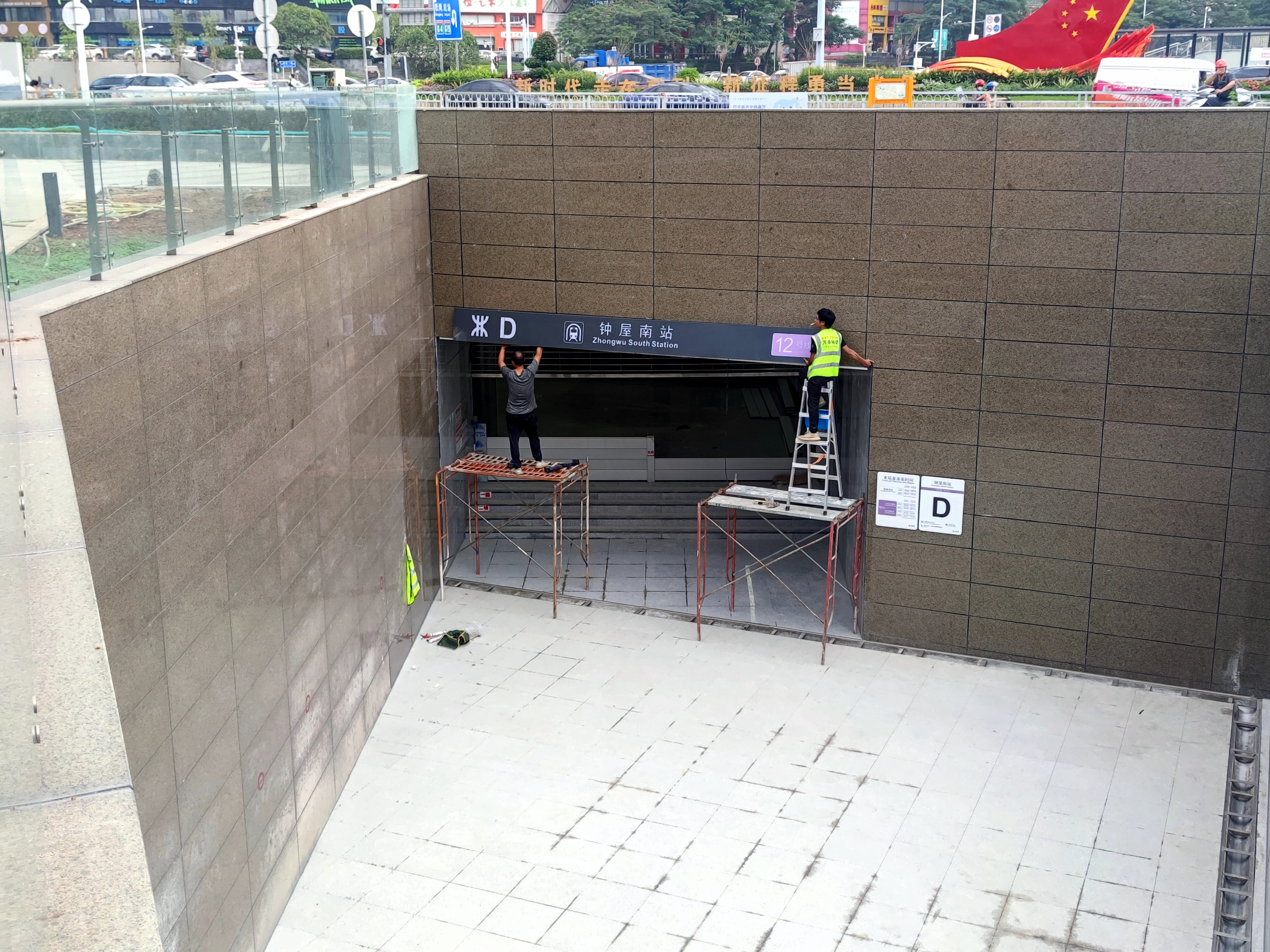
Entrance D

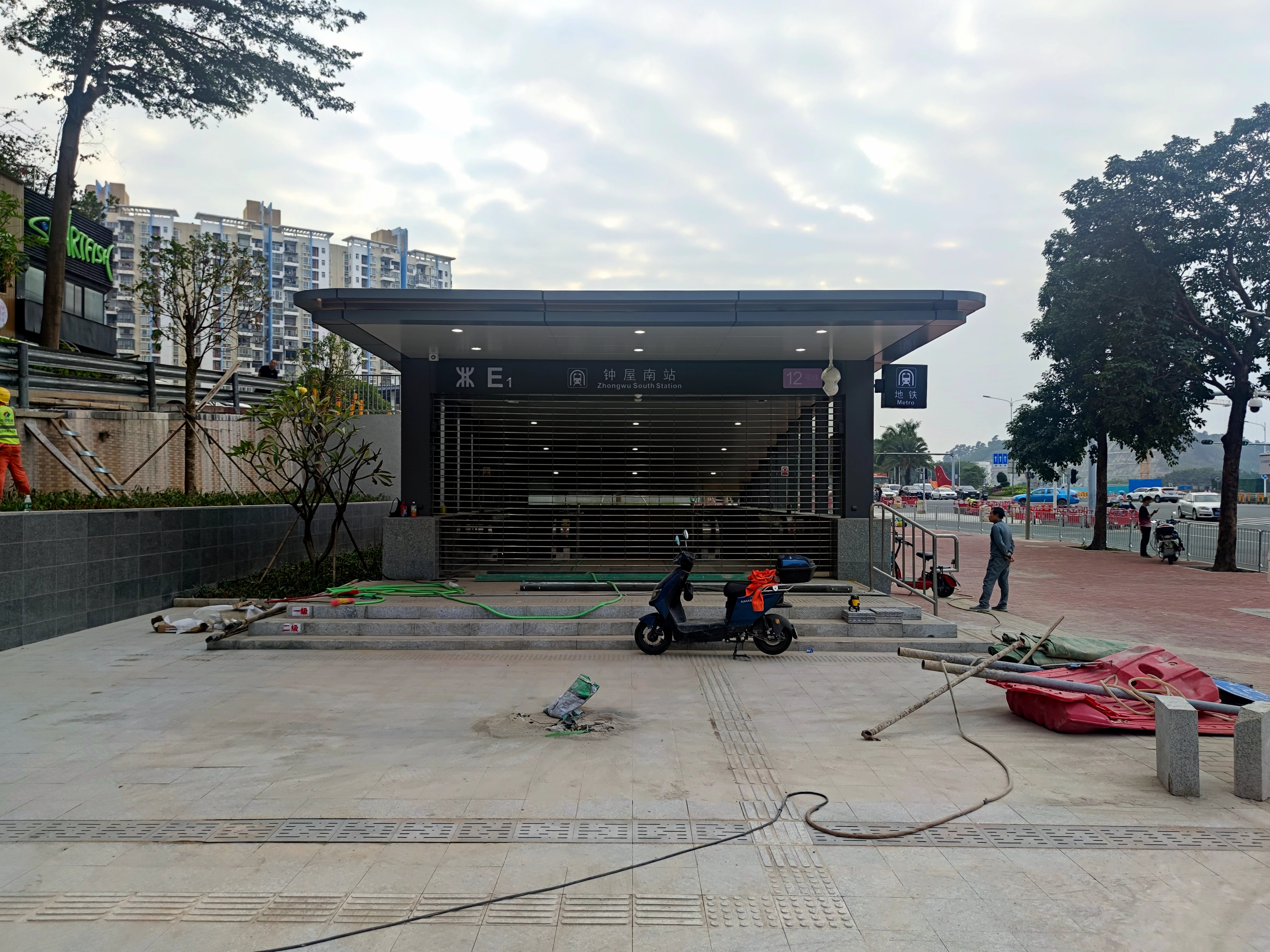
Entrance E1

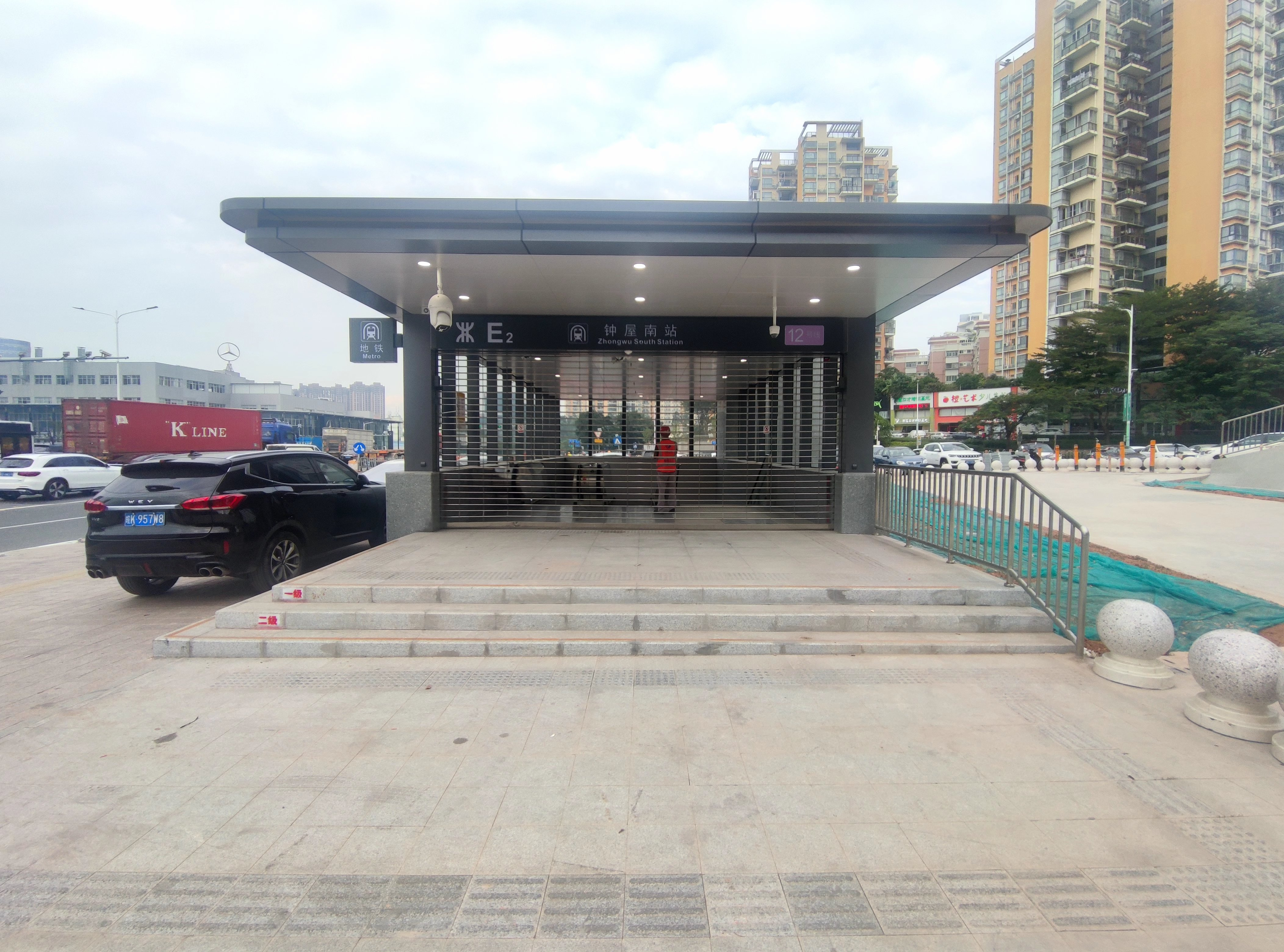
Entrance E2

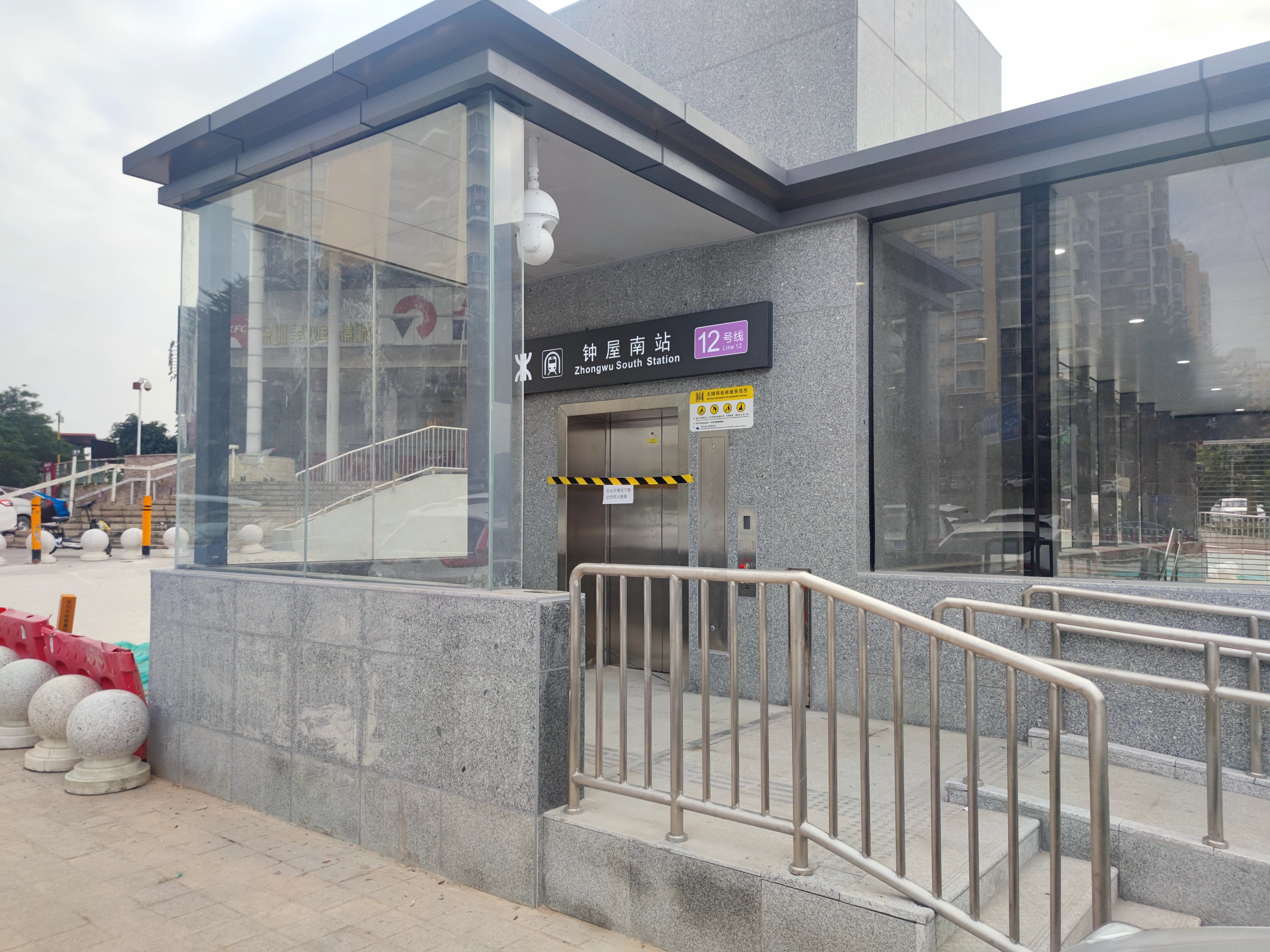
Entrance E2 (elevator entrance)
