= Shenshan Expressway =

Road in Guangdong, China

Shenshan Expressway
- 沈阳－海口高速公路
- 深汕高速公路

Route information
- Length: 286 km (178 mi)
- Existed: 8 November 1996–present

Location
- Country: China

Highway system
- National Trunk Highway System; Primary; Auxiliary; National Highways; Transport in China

The Shenshan Expressway (Chinese: 深汕高速) is a 286 kilometres (178 mi) expressway in the People's Republic of China connecting the cities of Shenzhen and Shantou in the province of Guangdong.

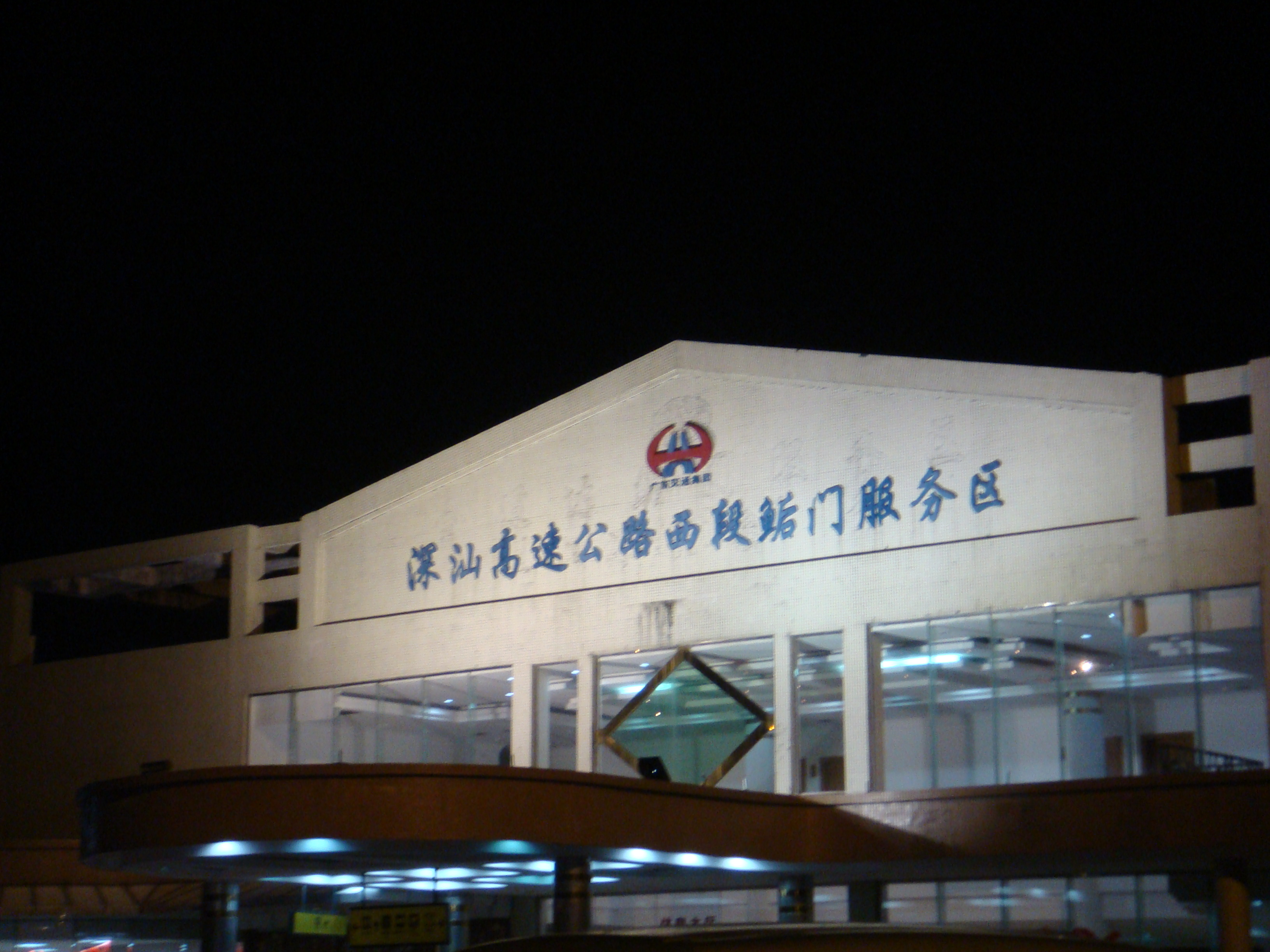
Service area

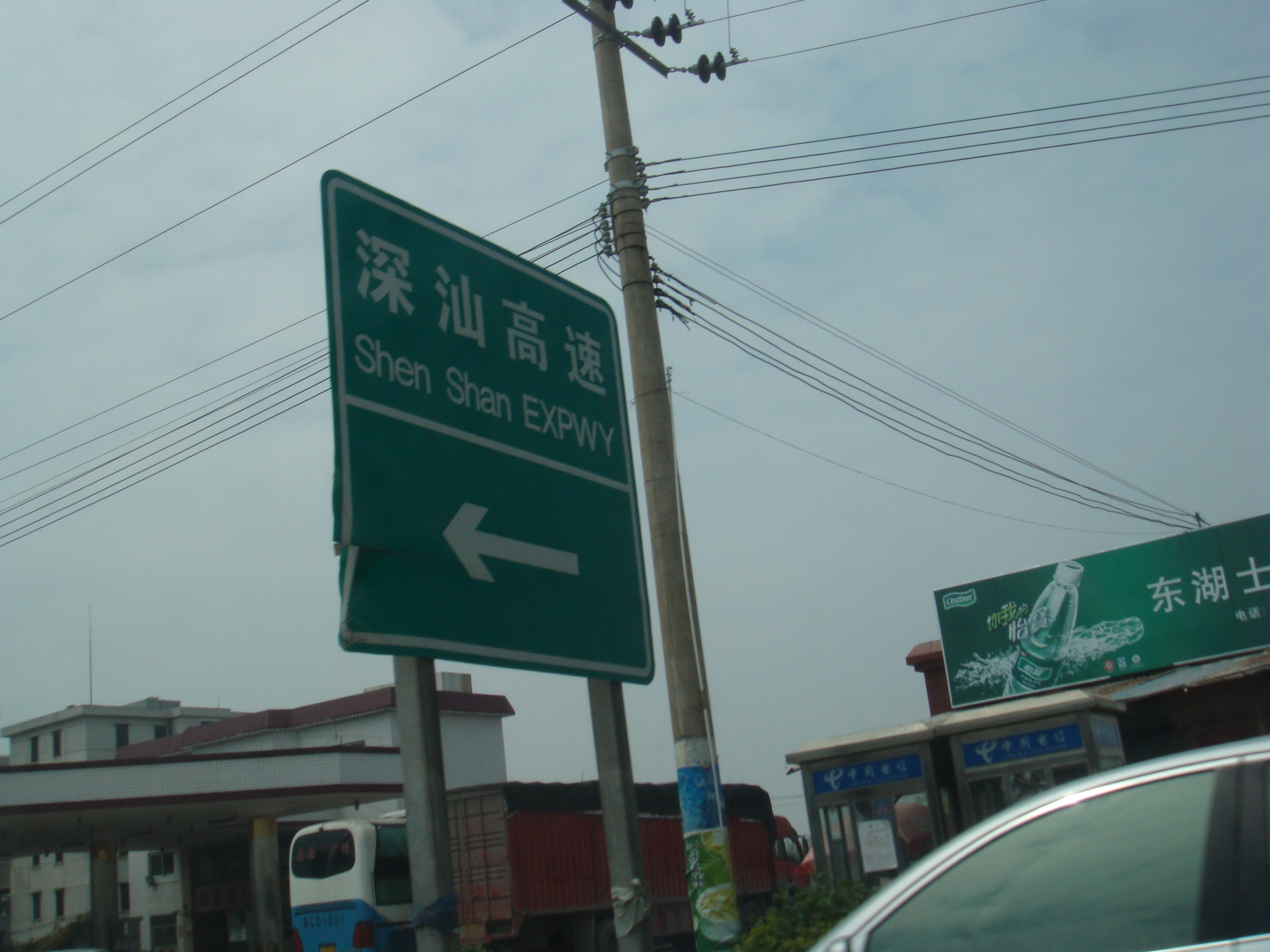
Entrance
