= Guangshen Expressway =

Road in Guangdong, China

Guangshen Expressway
- 广深高速公路

Route information
- Length: 122.80 km (76.30 mi)
- Existed: 1997–present

Major junctions
- North end: Guangdong S81 in Tianhe District, Guangzhou
- G4W in Guangzhou, Guangdong; G9411 in Dongguan, Guangdong; G15 in Shenzhen, Guangdong
- South end: Huanggang Road, Huanggang Port Control Point, Shenzhen, Guangdong

Location
- Country: China
- Major cities: Guangzhou, Dongguan, Shenzhen

Highway system
- Transport in China

Guangshen Expressway (simplified Chinese: 广深高速公路; traditional Chinese: 廣深高速公路; pinyin: Guǎngshēn Gāosùgōnglù), also known as the Guangshen Coastal Expressway, is an expressway that connects the cities of Guangzhou, Dongguan and Shenzhen in the Chinese province of Guangdong.

The expressway begins at Huangcun Bridge, north of Guangzhou City, and ends at the south of Shenzhen near Huanggang, where it connects with the northern section of Guangzhou City Expressway. It is a two-way six-lane highway 33.1 metres wide equipped with street lighting, with a length of 122.8 km and a speed limit of 120 km/h. It was designed for traffic volume of up to 60,000 vehicles per day. In 2012, data showed that the average daily traffic volume reached 400,000 vehicles.

== Introduction ==
The Guangshen Expressway is the major road link connecting Guangzhou, Dongguan, Shenzhen, and Hong Kong. The total investment is about 772 million yuan. Construction took place from May 1987 to December 1993, with testing from July 1994. Official operation began on 1 July 1997.

The Guangshen Yanjiang Expressway is the second expressway between Guangzhou and Shenzhen. The construction project has partially completed in the Guangzhou and Dongguan territory in January 2012 and opened to traffic. The Guangshen Yanjiang Expressway is the trunk route of the Shenzhen construction project, connecting the Shenzhen Western Corridor, western port, airport, and the west of Dongguan city. Also, this is the major expressway link between Hong Kong and Shenzhen, and Dongguan to Guangzhou. The Guangshen Yanjiang Expressway has a total length of 97 km, and an estimated initial investment of up to 15 billion yuan. The government expect the operation to finish in the end of 2012. When the construction completes, commuting from Guangzhou to Shenzhen will only take 1 hour, and Guangzhou to Hong Kong will take 1.5 hours.

== Construction background ==
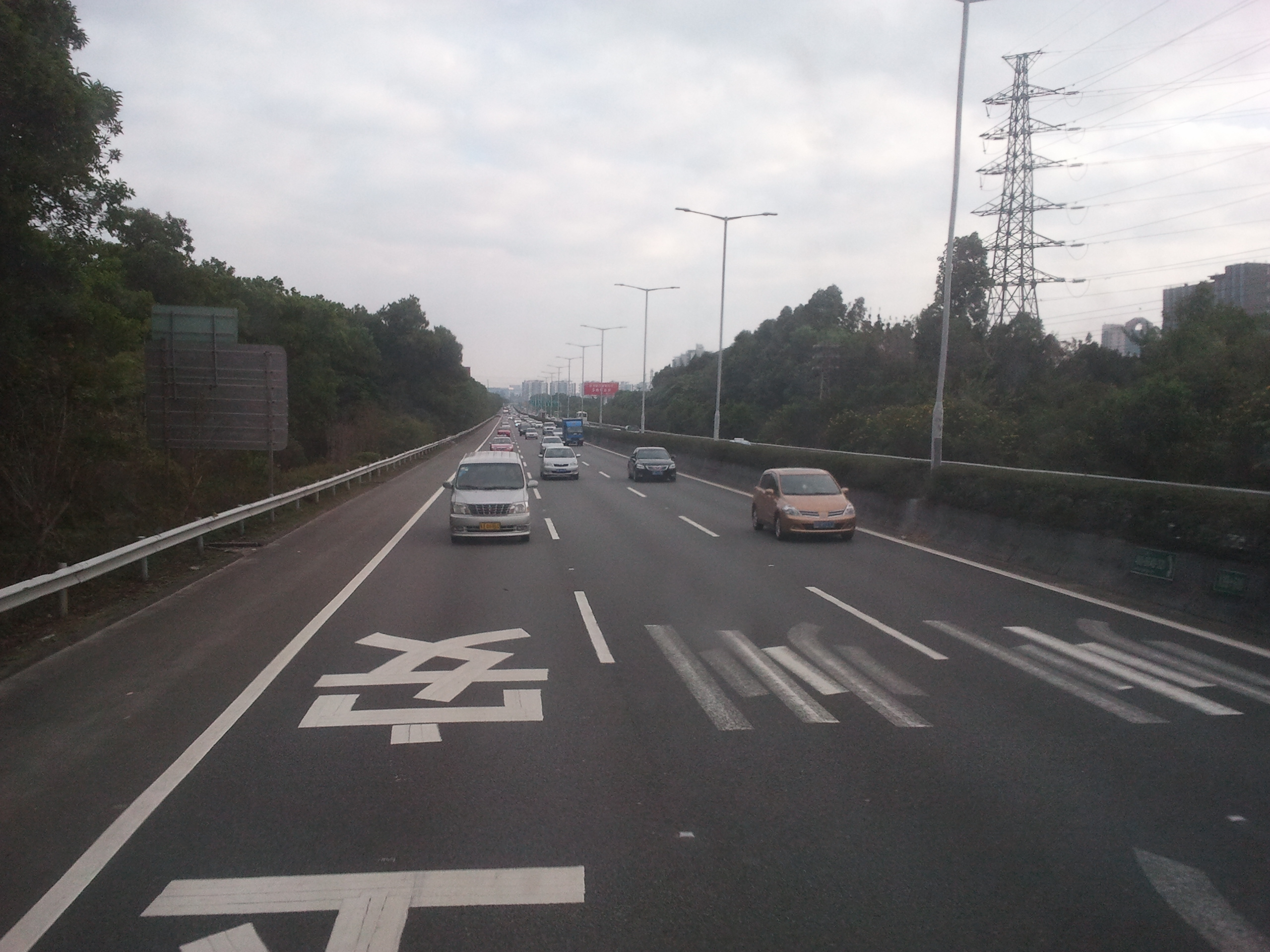
Guangshen expressway Baoan section

The Guangshen expressway construction is cooperated by the highway construction company of Guangdong provincial, the development of China (Highway), and the Hong Kong Hopewell Limited. They also set up a company called Guangzhou-Shenzhen-Zhuhai Highway Limited to invest and manage the Guangshen Expressway. The Guangshen expressway construction and the Hong Kong Hopewell has signed a corporation agreement named, "The letter of intent of construction for Guangzhou, Shenzhen, and Gongbei Highway" in June 1982. All stages of the research and infrastructure program have been approved in April 1988. The business registration and tax registration were set up in May 1988. The board of directors of the Guangzhou-Shenzhen-Zhuhai Expressway co., Ltd. used more than a year to complete the construction drawing design, pre-construction preparations such as requisition in 1989 winter.

In March 1990, the project started with new financing support from the Hong Kong Branch of Bank of China and Hong Kong Bank. Meanwhile, an international consortium was formed and signed a US$800 million project financing mortgage loan agreement in March 1991 to launch the project. In February 1991, the finance mortgage loan files were approved by relevant departments in China and the Guangdong Provincial Committee. The main construction and bridge project of Guangshen Expressway was completed a test run madein July 1994.

The whole Guangshen Expressway project cost a total of $1.34 billion and 704 million yuan (including Huanggang port construction, and checkpoints construction of Shenzhen SEZ and construction period interest). The Hong Kong Hopewell Ltd and China Development (Highway) limited provides registered funds of 90 million dollars and also provides shareholders loan 450 million dollars. The Hong Kong Hopewell Ltd. and China Development (Highway) limited are the primary borrower of this mortgage and loaned to the Guangzhou-Shenzhen-Zhuhai Highway Limited under equivalent terms. The Chinese bank also provided a mortgage for requisitions of 7.04 billion dollars.

== Supporting facilities ==
Guangshen Expressway has a full-length of 122.8 km, and a speed limit of 120 km/h, and a six lane line design for both direction, street lighting system along Guangzhou, Huocun, Luogang, Xintang, and Machong, Wangniudun, Daojiao, Shigu, Houjie, Taiping, Wudianmei, Changan, Xinqiao, Fuyong, Hezhou, Baoan, Nantou, Futian and the Huanggang Port, and 20 toll stations with the interoperability type overpass; Also, the Tongle checkpoints will build near the Nantou toll stations;

Meanwhile, every Hong Kong bus transporting commute to Hong Kong and Guangzhou must go by Guangshen Expressway.

There are a great number of rivers and Soft Land in the eastern of the Pearl River Delta. In order to improve longitudinal slope and avoid soft ground sinking hidden danger, Viaduct will be adopted at rivers intensive place and thickness of mollisol more than 12 meters.

The whole viaduct has a length of 45.041 km in total. The seven navigable rivers of Dongjiang estuary and soft ground segment bridge have a length of 19.64 km.

The Guangshen Expressway use China's road technical as standard, and reference foreign high-speed standard to planning and design, therefore the Guangshan Expressway main technical indicators meet or exceed the requirements of existing domestic standards.

== Hubs along the highway ==
- The Huangcun hub: Guangzhou Beltway
- The Huocun hub: Northern second Beltway
- The Xinlian hub: ChangHu Expressway (Extension)
- The Taipin Hub: Humen Expressway
- The Wudianmei hub: ChangHu Expressway
- The Hezhou hub: Jihe Expressway
- The city along the Guangzhou-Shenzhen Highway all has well-developed economy. There are 21 towns, city, and development zones within five kilometres of the expressway and connections to the Guangzhou beltway and Humen Bridge Expressway. There are 16 interchanges, 20 toll stations, 127 entrance lines, and 300 exit lines in Guangshen Expressway.

== Fee Issue ==
Guangshen Expressway through Guangzhou and Shenzhen has a population of two million people in the city. Another city between Guangzhou and Shengzhen, which is Dongguan, is known as the "world factory", therefore the volume of traffic on Guangshen Expressway was huge. It is known as "China's most profitable highway" and traffic jams are very common. 1 June 2012, the charge for Guangshen Expressway partially decreased.

Class 1 vehicles (less than 2.5 tons, excluding 2.5 tons)
Class 2 vehicles (2.5-8 tons, excluding 8 tons)
Class 3 vehicles (8-12 tons, excluding 12 tons)
Class 4 vehicles (over 12 tons)

=== Original standard ===
Class 1 vehicle (less than 2.5 tons): 70 yuan;
Class 2 vehicle (2.5-8 tons): 145 yuan;
Class 3 vehicle (8-12 tons): 220 yuan
Class 4 vehicle (over 12 tons): 275 yuan
Class 5 vehicle: 300 yuan

=== After adjusted standard ===
Class 1 vehicle (less than 2.5 tons): 74 yuan;
Class 2 vehicle (2.5-8 tons): 111 yuan;
Class 3 vehicle (8-12 tons): 221 yuan
Class 4 vehicle (over 12 tons): 258 yuan
Class 5 vehicle: 300 yuan

=== Last adjusted standard ===
Class 1 vehicle (less than 2.5 tons): 70 yuan;
Class 2 vehicle (2.5-8 tons): 111 yuan;
Class 3 vehicle (8-12 tons): 221 yuan
Class 4 vehicle (over 12 tons): 258 yuan
Class 5 vehicle: 300 yuan

==== Guangshen Expressway ====
On 27 January 2013, The Congress of the Guangdong Provincial proposed to cancel the GSE fees, as they think the charge on the highway for many years have been unreasonable. A lot of representatives speak up and questioned from 2003 to December 2012. Eventually, the Guangshen expressway finally reduced 2 dollars. Lin Hui, the Shenzhen delegation, regretted the price reduction. Considering the poor road condition of the Guangshen Expressway, prevailing slowly, and the debt long-paid. Therefore, she nicknamed Guangshen "Fee adamancy".

"To be honest, all citizens of Guangzhou and Shenzhen have a headache for the Guangshen Expressway. Other than the off-peak hour after 23:00, the road is solid with traffic." Lin Hui said, on the two Conferences (the NPC and the CPPCC), they agreed the necessity to strengthen city-to-city cooperation between Guangzhou and Shenzhen. Although they are only 150 kilometres apart, people have to spend 2–3 hours on the highway. Delegation representatives of Shenzhen city started to mention to cut the price in 2003. Shenzhen representatives have requested a reduction every year since 2007.

Linhui recalls that in mid-2012, the charges for the highway were somewhat relieved, all the fees decreased, except for Class 1 vehicles. Price for Class 1 vehicles increased surprisingly. However, the price increase does not reduce the Class 1 traffic, but rather it increased to 70 percent of the total volume on Guangshen Expressway. This increased the frustration among locals. In the end, the price of Class 1 vehicles was reduced to 70 yuan again in December last year.

After 10 years of lobbying, the price has only been cut by 2 yuan, and with more wrecked roads. " She said that this year, she has no plans to propose a price reduction motion on GSE, since it is not effective by going down by 2 yuan. This is too frustrating," In fact, I do not want to give them pressure, but how can we accept such poor road condition?"

== Bibliography ==
"List of Highway in China." China Highway. China Highway,2010. Web. 4 Apr. 2013. <http://www.china-highway.com/htmls/names.htm
