= Songgang Park station =

Metro station in Shenzhen, Guangdong, China

Coordinates: 22°32′58″N 114°7′22″E

Songgang Park 松岗公园
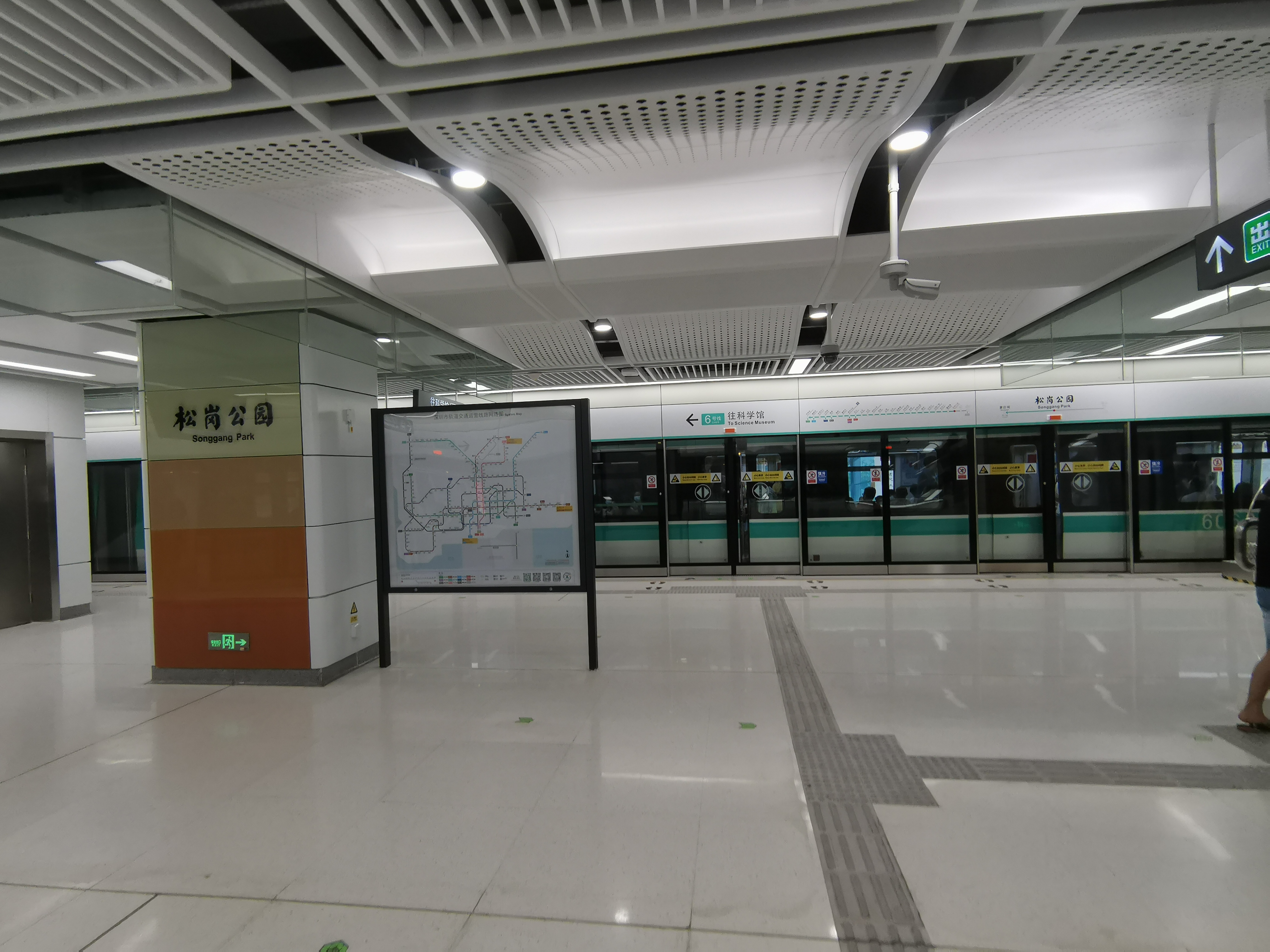

General information
- Location: Longhua District, Shenzhen, Guangdong; China
- Operated by: SZMC (Shenzhen Metro Group)
- Line: Line 6
- Platforms: 2 (1 island platform)
- Tracks: 2

Construction
- Structure type: Underground
- Accessible: Yes

History
- Opened: 18 August 2020

Services
Preceding station	Shenzhen Metro	Following station
Xitou towards Songgang	Line 6	Shutianpu towards Science Museum
Location

Songgang Park station (Chinese: 松岗公园站; pinyin: Sōnggǎng Gōngyuán Zhàn) is a station on Line 6 of the Shenzhen Metro. It opened on 18 August 2020.

== Station layout ==
G	-	Exit
B1F; Concourse	Lobby	Customer Service, Shops, Vending machines, ATMs
B2F; Platforms	Platform	← Line 6 towards Science Museum (Shutianpu)
B2F; Platforms	Island platform, doors will open on the left
B2F; Platforms	Platform	→ Line 6 towards Songgang (Xitou) →

== Exits ==
Exit	Destination
Exit A	North Side of Shajiang East Rd (E), Dongfeng Road (E)
Exit B	North Side of Shajiang East Rd (W), Songgang Park
Exit C	South Side of Shajiang East Rd (W), Dongfeng Road (W), Qilin Xincun
Exit D	South Side of Shajiang East Rd (E), Dongfeng Road (W)
