= Shangfen station =

Metro station in Shenzhen, China

Shangfen 上芬
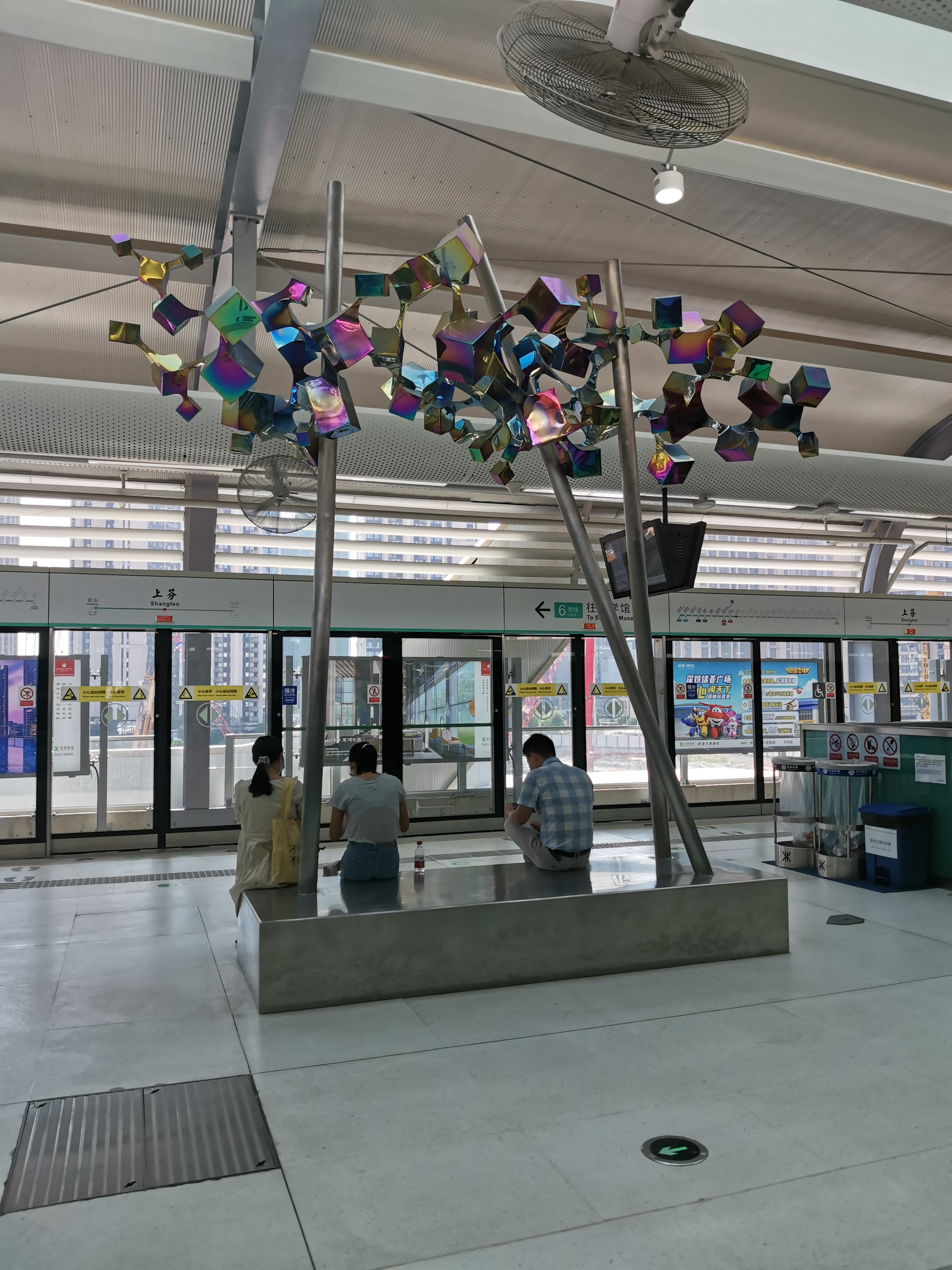

General information
- Location: Longhua District, Shenzhen, Guangdong; China
- Coordinates: 22.643208°N 114.011582°E
- Operated by: SZMC (Shenzhen Metro Group)
- Line: Line 6
- Platforms: 2 (1 island platform)
- Tracks: 2

Construction
- Structure type: Elevated
- Accessible: Yes

History
- Opened: 18 August 2020

Services
Preceding station	Shenzhen Metro	Following station
Yuanfen towards Songgang	Line 6	Hongshan towards Science Museum
Location

Shangfen station (Chinese: 上芬站; pinyin: Shàngfēn Zhàn) is a station on Line 6 of the Shenzhen Metro. It opened on 18 August 2020.

== Station layout ==
3F; Platforms	Platform	← Line 6 towards Science Museum (Hongshan)
3F; Platforms	Island platform, doors will open on the left
3F; Platforms	Platform	→ Line 6 towards Songgang (Yuanfen) →
2F; Concourse	Lobby	Customer Service, Shops, Vending machines, ATMs
G	-	Exit

== Exits ==
Exit	Destination
Exit A	Longwu Industrial park, Nine Yuanchuangyuan, Shenzhen Yu Cheng Automobile Sales and Service Co. LTD, South of Bulong Road
Exit B	Xitou village, South of Bulong Road
Exit C	Hongrongyuan.Shangjun, Longsheng Hengbo Center, North side of Bulong Road
Exit D	Yulong Huating, Shangfen Primary School, Zhonghai Jincheng, North side of Bulong Road
