= Changzhen station =

Metro station in Shenzhen, China

Coordinates: 22°32′58″N 114°7′22″E

Changzhen 长圳
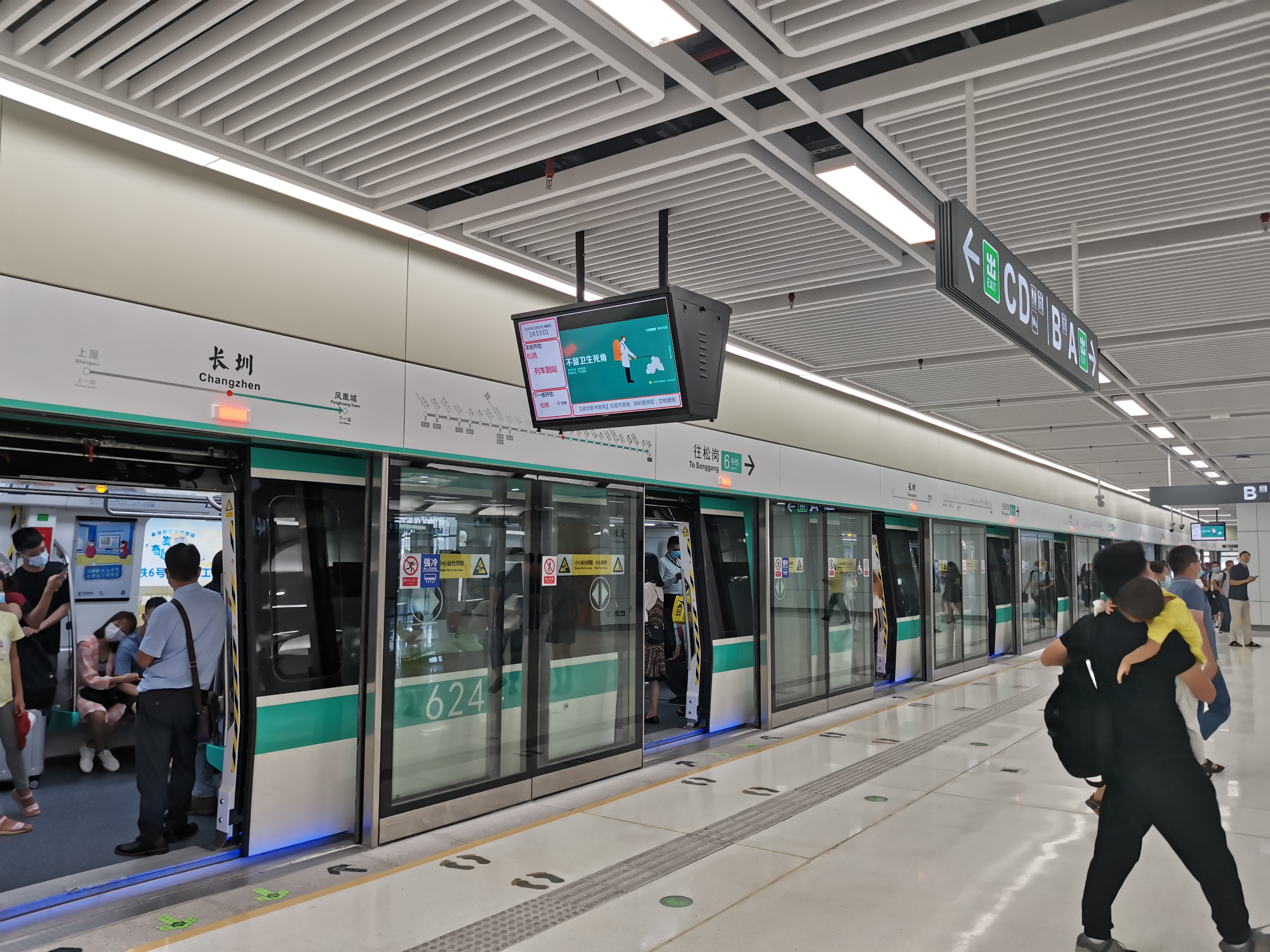

General information
- Location: Guangming District, Shenzhen, Guangdong; China
- Operated by: SZMC (Shenzhen Metro Group)
- Line(s): Line 6
- Platforms: 2 (2 side platforms)
- Tracks: 2

Construction
- Structure type: Elevated
- Accessible: Yes

History
- Opened: 18 August 2020

Services
Preceding station	Shenzhen Metro	Following station
Fenghuang Town towards Songgang	Line 6	Shangwu towards Science Museum

Changzhen station (Chinese: 长圳站; pinyin: Chángzhèn Zhàn) is a station on Line 6 of the Shenzhen Metro. It opened on 18 August 2020.

== Station layout ==
3F; Passageways	-	Passageways between east & west lobbies, platforms
2F; Concourse & platforms	West lobby	Customer service, shops, vending machines, ATMs
2F; Concourse & platforms	Side platform, doors will open on the right
2F; Concourse & platforms	Platform	← Line 6 towards Science Museum (Shangwu)
2F; Concourse & platforms	Platform	→ Line 6 towards Songgang (Fenghuang Town) →
2F; Concourse & platforms	Side platform, doors will open on the right
2F; Concourse & platforms	East Lobby	Customer service, shops, vending machines, ATMs
G	-	Exit

== Exits ==
Exit	Destination
Exit A	East side of Keyu Rd (N), North side of Guangqiao Rd (E)
Exit B	East side of Keyu Rd (S), Changzhen Social Security Housing
Exit C	West side of Keyu Rd (N)
Exit D	West side of Keyu Rd (S), North side of Guangqiao Rd (W)
