= Shutianpu station =

Metro station in Shenzhen, China

Shutianpu 薯田埔
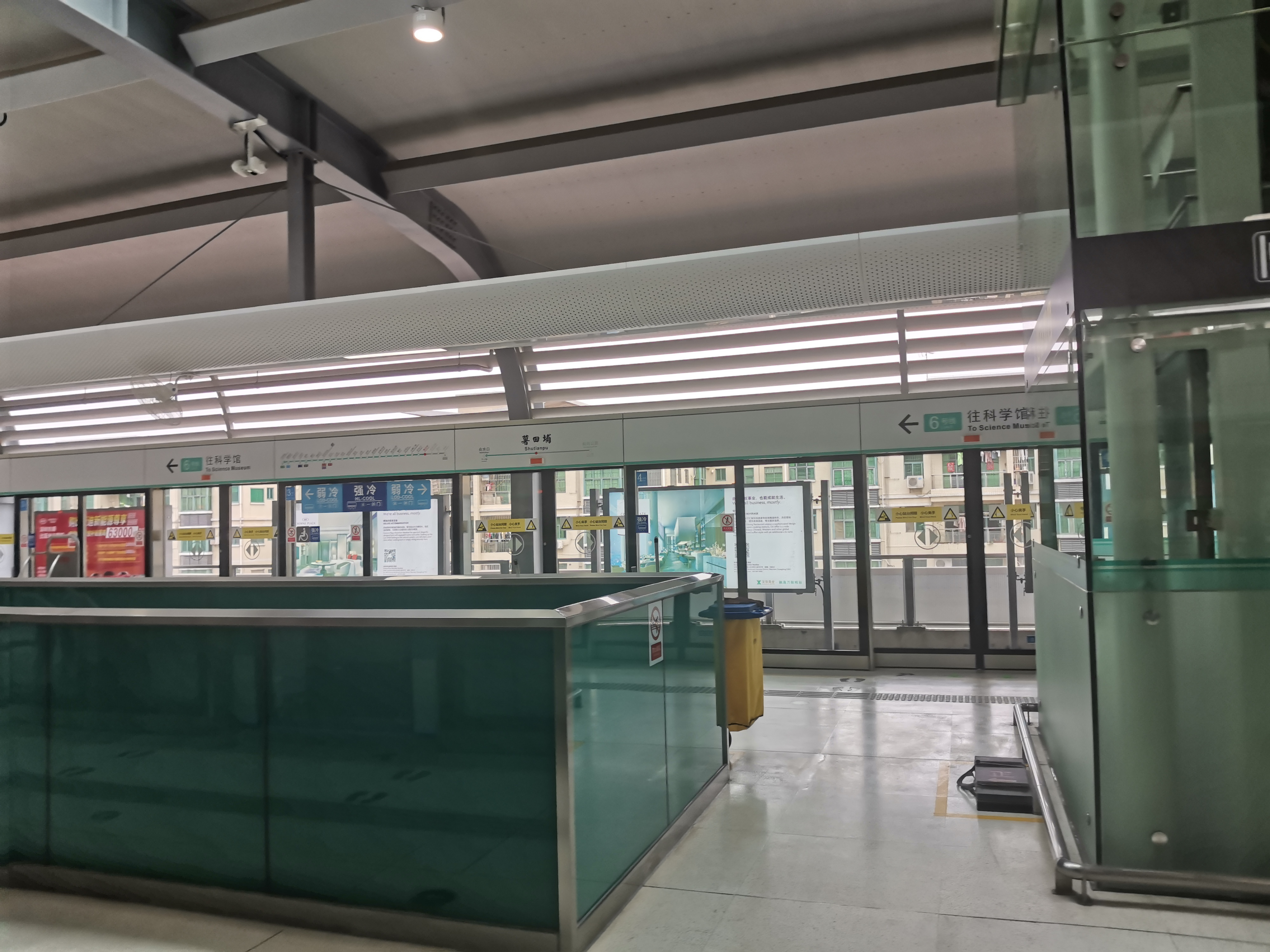
- Platform

General information
- Location: Guangming District, Shenzhen, Guangdong; China
- Operated by: SZMC (Shenzhen Metro Group)
- Line: Line 6
- Platforms: 2 (1 island platform)
- Tracks: 2

Construction
- Structure type: Elevated
- Accessible: Yes

History
- Opened: 18 August 2020

Services
Preceding station	Shenzhen Metro	Following station
Songgang Park towards Songgang	Line 6	Heshuikou towards Science Museum
Location

Shutianpu station (Chinese: 薯田埔站; pinyin: Shǔtiánpū Zhàn) is a station on Line 6 of the Shenzhen Metro. It opened on 18 August 2020.

== Station layout ==
3F; Platforms	Platform	← Line 6 towards Science Museum (Heshuikou)
3F; Platforms	Island platform, doors will open on the left
3F; Platforms	Platform	→ Line 6 towards Songgang (Songgang Park) →
2F; Concourse	Lobby	Customer Service, Shops, Vending machines, ATMs
G	-	Exit

== Exits ==
Exit	Destination
Exit A	Vienna Hotel, Matian police station, North side of Songbai Road (E)
Exit B	Tianyuan Road, North of Songbai Road (W)
Exit C	Songming Industrial Park, South side of Songbai Road (W)
Exit D	Shutianpu community, Fuzhuang garden, Xihuan Avenue, South side of Songbai Road (E)
