= Hongshan station (Shenzhen Metro) =

Metro station in Shenzhen, Guangdong, China

Coordinates: 22°37′20″N 114°1′24″E

Hongshan 红山
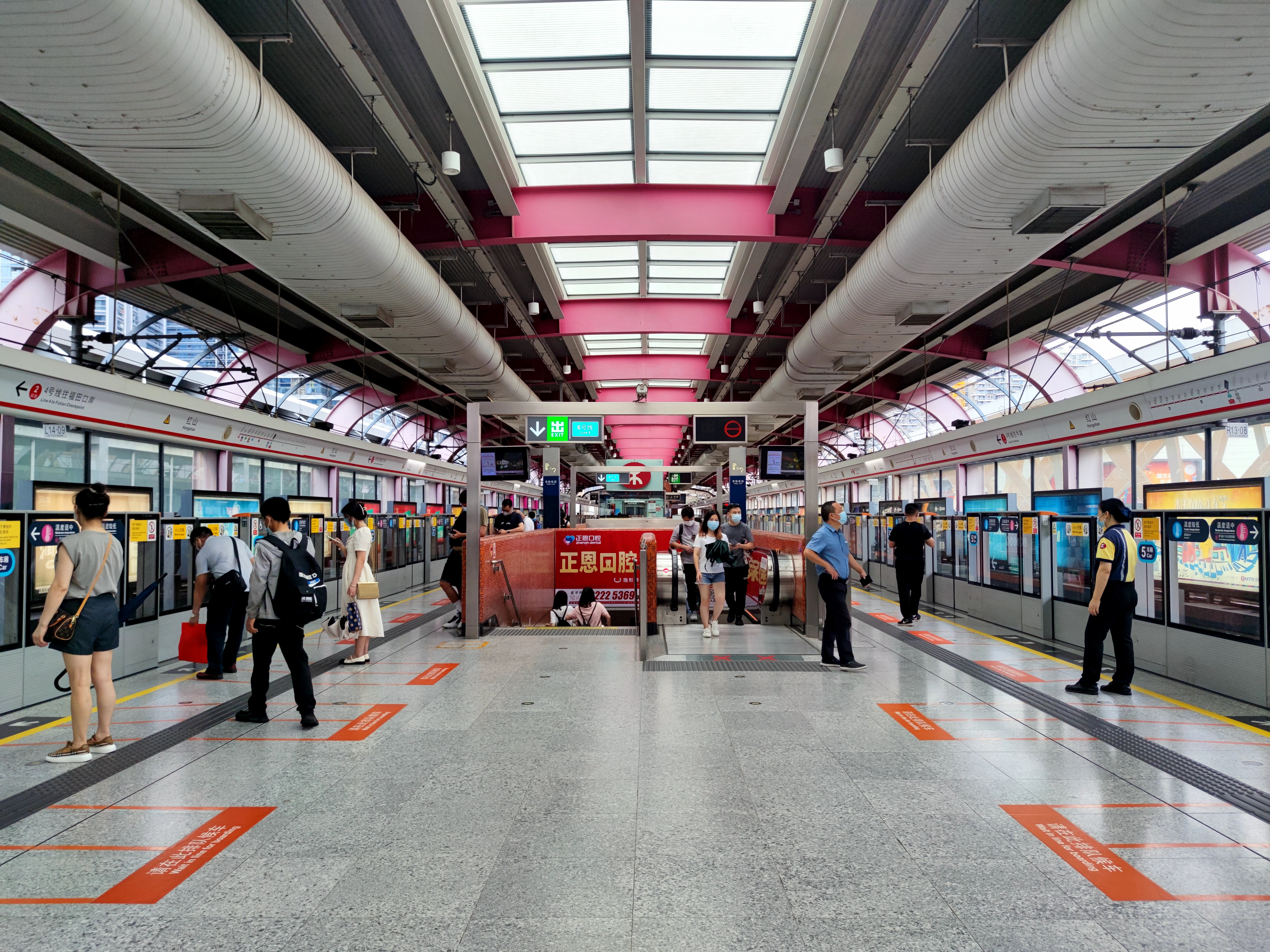
- Line 4 platform

Chinese name
- Simplified Chinese: 红山
- Traditional Chinese: 紅山
- Literal meaning: red hill
Transcriptions
Yue: Cantonese
- Jyutping: hung^{4} saan^{1}

General information
- Location: Longhua District, Shenzhen, Guangdong; China
- Operated by: MTR Corporation (Shenzhen); SZMC (Shenzhen Metro Group)
- Lines: Line 4; Line 6
- Platforms: 4 (2 island platforms)
- Tracks: 4

Construction
- Structure type: Elevated
- Accessible: Yes

History
- Opened: 16 June 2011 (Line 4); 18 August 2020 (Line 6)

Services
| Preceding station | Shenzhen Metro | Following station |
|---|---|---|
| Shangtang towards Niuhu | Line 4 | Shenzhen North towards Futian Checkpoint |
| Shangfen towards Songgang | Line 6 | Shenzhen North towards Science Museum |
Location

Hongshan station (simplified Chinese: 红山站; traditional Chinese: 紅山站; pinyin: Hóngshān Zhàn; Jyutping: hung4 saan1 zaam6) is a station of Line 4 and Line 6 of the Shenzhen Metro. Line 4 platforms opened on 16 June 2011 and Line 6 platforms opened on 18 August 2020.

== Station layout ==
| 3F; Platforms | Platform 2 | ← Line 6 towards Science Museum (Shenzhen North) |
| 3F; Platforms | Island platform, doors will open on the left |
| 3F; Platforms | Platform 1 | → Line 6 towards Songgang (Shangfen) → |
| 3F; Platforms | Platform 2 | ← Line 4 towards Futian Checkpoint (Shenzhen North) |
| 3F; Platforms | Island platform, doors will open on the left |
| 3F; Platforms | Platform 1 | → Line 4 towards Niuhu (Shangtang) → |
| 2F; Concourse | Lobby | Customer Service, Shops, Vending machines, ATMs |
| G | - | Exit |

== Exits ==
| Exit | Destination |
|---|---|
| Exit A | East side of Tenglong Road (N) |
| Exit B | West side of Tenglong Road (N), Longguangjiu Diamond |
| Exit C | West side of Tenglong Road (S), Hongshan 6979 Commercial Centre |
| Exit D | East side of Tenglong Road (S) |

== Gallery ==
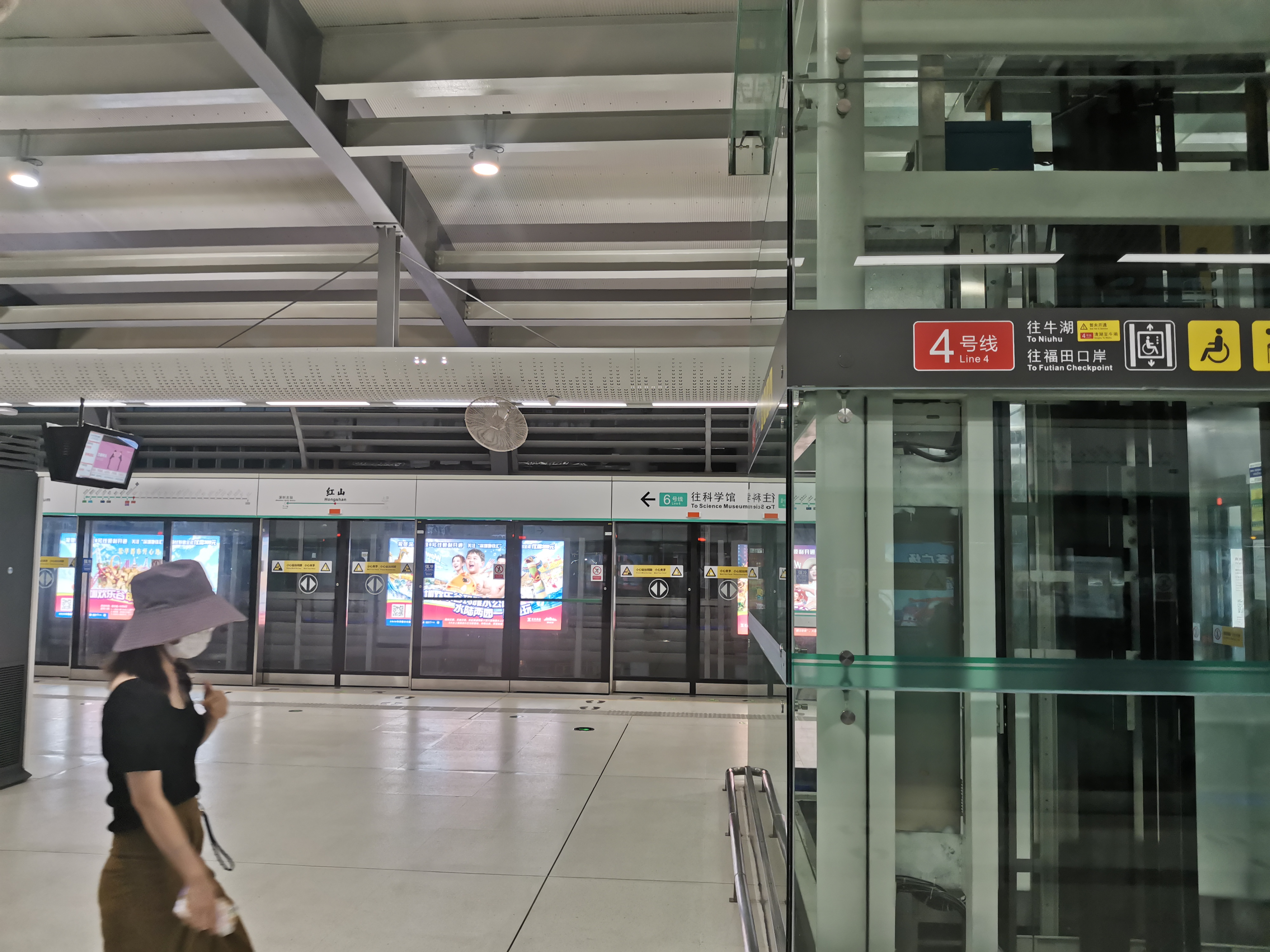
Line 6 Platform
