= Yuanfen station =

Metro station in Shenzhen, China

Yuanfen 元芬
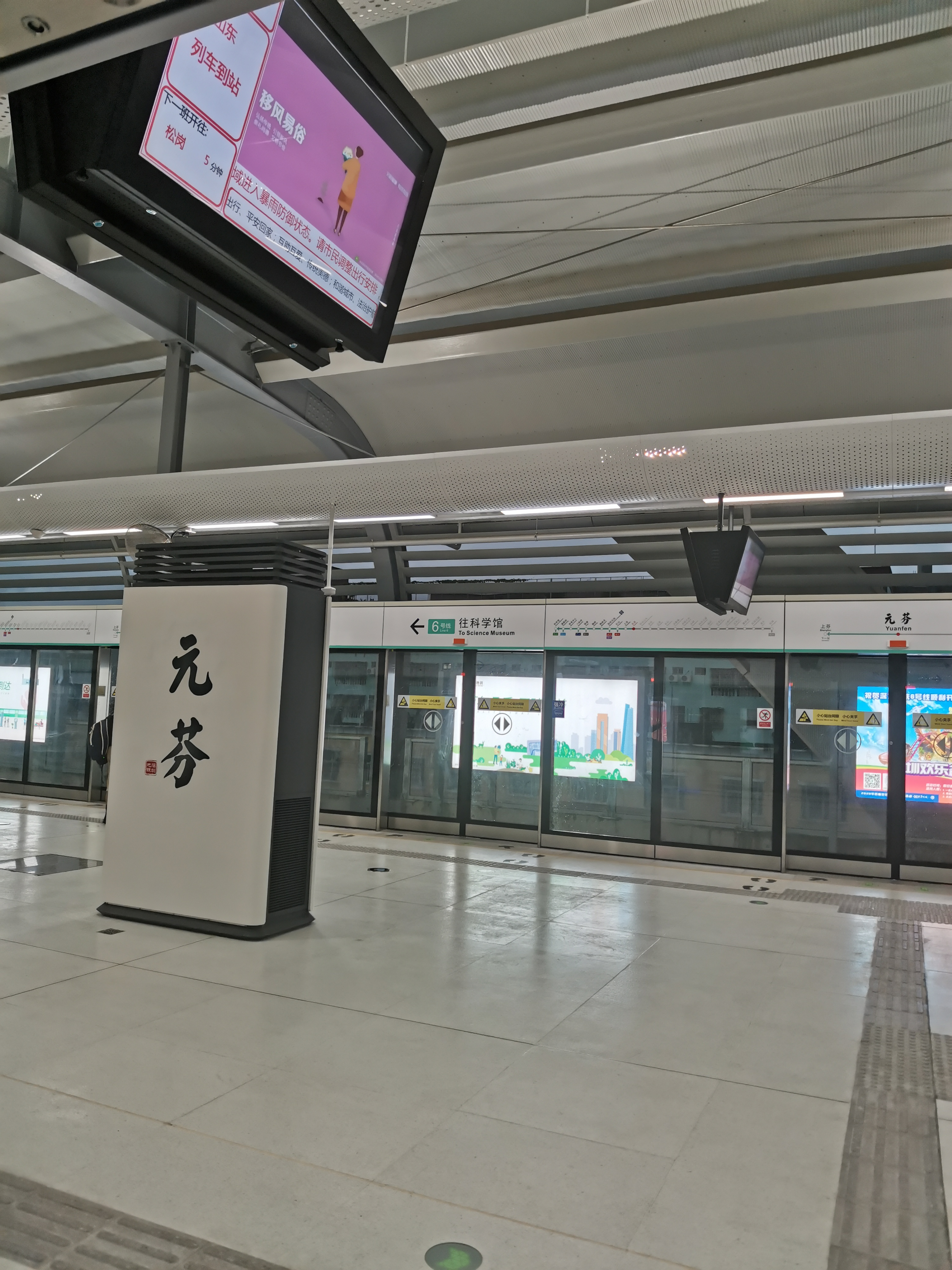

General information
- Location: Longhua District, Shenzhen, Guangdong; China
- Coordinates: 22.659073°N 114.000189°E
- Operated by: SZMC (Shenzhen Metro Group)
- Line: Line 6
- Platforms: 2 (1 island platform)
- Tracks: 2

Construction
- Structure type: Elevated
- Accessible: Yes

History
- Opened: 18 August 2020

Services
Preceding station	Shenzhen Metro	Following station
Yangtai Mountain East towards Songgang	Line 6	Shangfen towards Science Museum
Location

Yuanfen station (Chinese: 元芬站; pinyin: Yuánfēn Zhàn) is a station on Line 6 of the Shenzhen Metro. It opened on 18 August 2020.

== Station layout ==
3F; Platforms	Platform	← Line 6 towards Science Museum (Shangfen)
3F; Platforms	Island platform, doors will open on the left
3F; Platforms	Platform	→ Line 6 towards Songgang (Yangtai Mountain East) →
2F; Concourse	Lobby	Customer Service, Shops, Vending machines, ATMs
G	-	Exit

== Exits ==
Exit		Destination
Exit A		Yuying Primary School, Jinyuan Building, Shangzao New Village, East side of Bulong Road (S)
Exit B		East side of Bulong Road (N), Queshan Second village
Exit C		West area of Queshan Second village, West side of Bulong Road (N)
Exit D	D1	West side of Bulong Road (S), Yuanfen Industrial Zone
Exit D	D2	West side of Bulong Road (S), Yuanfen Industrial Zone
