= Yangtai Mountain East station =

Metro station in Shenzhen, Guangdong, China

Yangtai Mountain East 阳台山东
- Platform

General information
- Location: Longhua District, Shenzhen, Guangdong; China
- Coordinates: 22.670765°N 113.986582°E
- Operated by: SZMC (Shenzhen Metro Group)
- Line: Line 6
- Platforms: 2 (1 island platform)
- Tracks: 2

Construction
- Structure type: Elevated
- Accessible: Yes

History
- Opened: 18 August 2020

Services
Preceding station	Shenzhen Metro	Following station
Guantian towards Songgang	Line 6	Yuanfen towards Science Museum
Location

Yangtai Mountain East station (Chinese: 阳台山东站; pinyin: Yángtáishān Dōng Zhàn) is a station on Line 6 of the Shenzhen Metro. It opened on 18 August 2020. The origin name of this station in Chinese is "羊台山东站", which changed to "阳台山东站" because the standard name of Yangtai Mountain returned to the origin name "阳台山" at 11 June 2020 by Shenzhen Government.

== Station layout ==
3F; Platforms	Platform	← Line 6 towards Science Museum (Yuanfen)
3F; Platforms	Island platform, doors will open on the left
3F; Platforms	Platform	→ Line 6 towards Songgang (Guantian) →
2F; Concourse	Lobby	Customer Service, Shops, Vending machines, ATMs
G	-	Exit

== Exits ==
Exit	Destination
Exit A	South side of Bulong Rd (W), Yangtai Mountain Park
Exit B	South Side of Bulong Rd (E)
Exit C	North Side of Bulong Rd (W), Tanluo Xinyicun, Baoshan Xincun, Longhua Women and Children's Health Centre

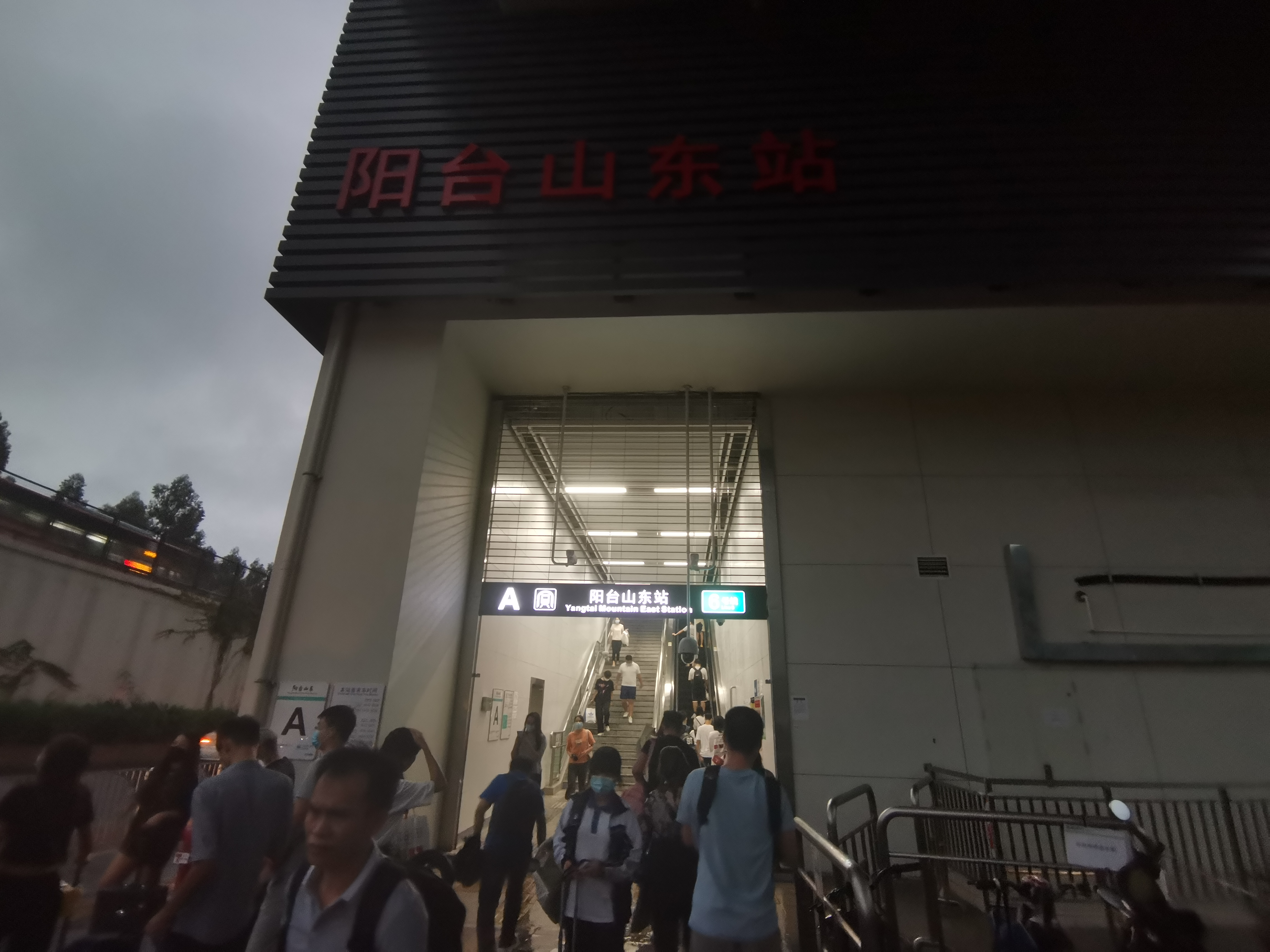
Exit A

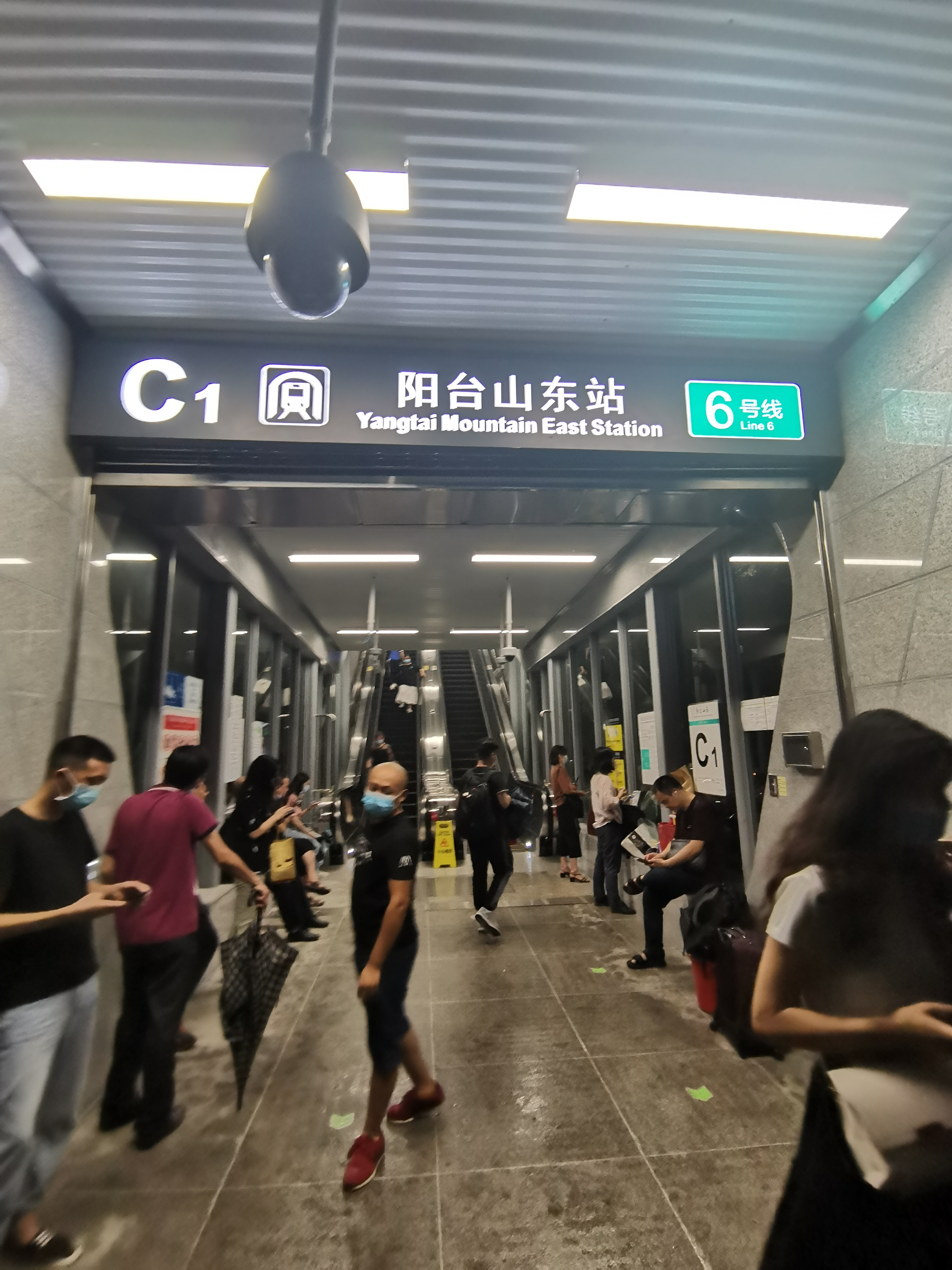
Exit C1
