= Guantian station =

Guantian station may refer to the following stations:

- Guantian station (Shenzhen Metro), a station on Line 6 of the Shenzhen Metro in China
- Guantian station (Nanchang Metro), a station on Line 2 of the Nanchang Metro in China
