= Guantian station (Shenzhen Metro) =

Metro station in Shenzhen, China

Guantian 官田
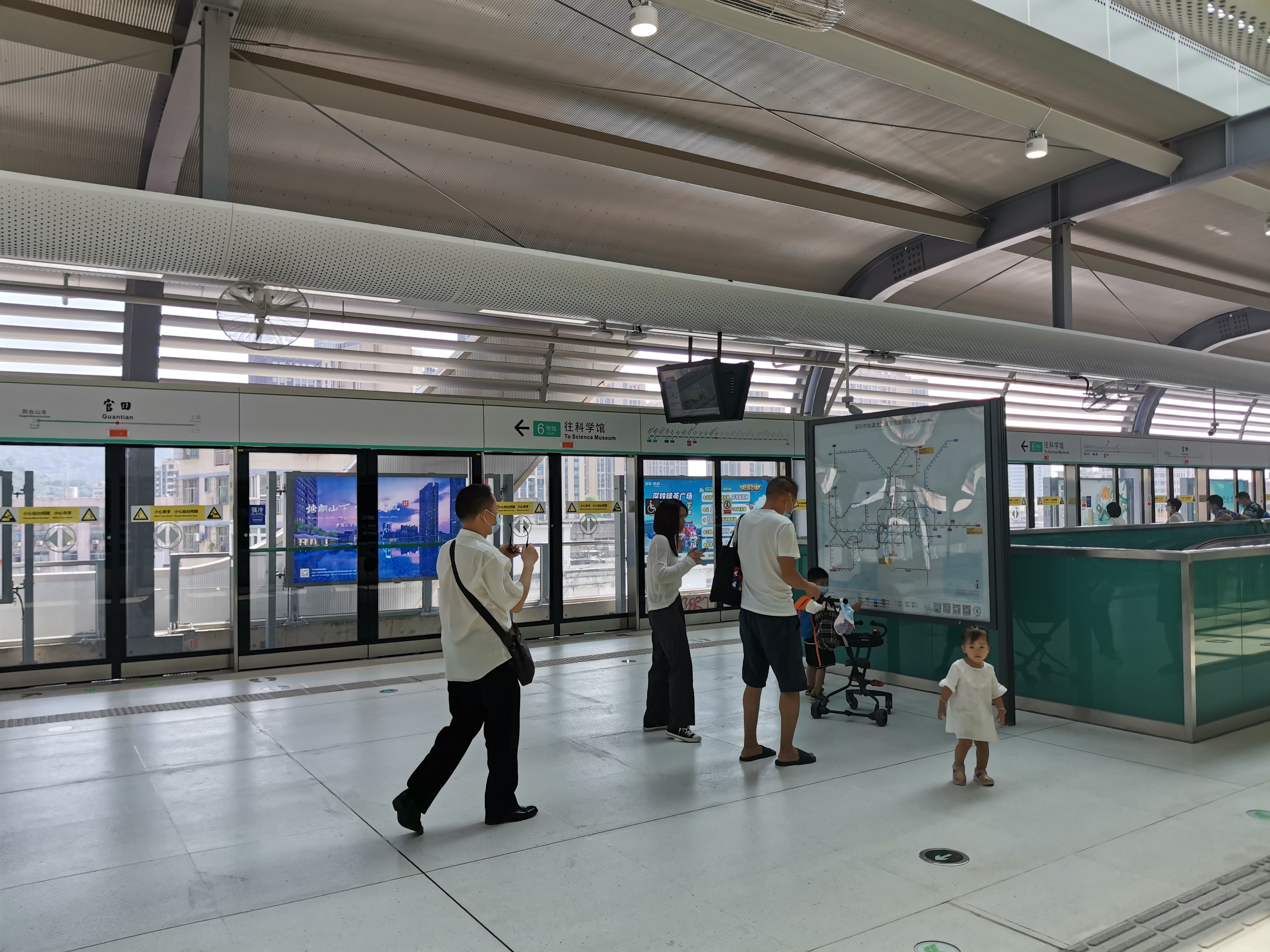

General information
- Location: Bao'an District, Shenzhen, Guangdong; China
- Coordinates: 22.686234°N 113.944810°E
- Operated by: SZMC (Shenzhen Metro Group)
- Line: Line 6
- Platforms: 2 (1 island platform)
- Tracks: 2

Construction
- Structure type: Elevated
- Accessible: Yes

History
- Opened: 18 August 2020

Services
Preceding station	Shenzhen Metro	Following station
Shangwu towards Songgang	Line 6	Yangtai Mountain East towards Science Museum
Location

Guantian station (Chinese: 官田站; pinyin: Guāntián Zhàn) is a station on Line 6 of the Shenzhen Metro. It opened on 18 August 2020.

== Station layout ==
3F; Platforms	Platform	← Line 6 towards Science Museum (Yangtai Mountain East)
3F; Platforms	Island platform, doors will open on the left
3F; Platforms	Platform	→ Line 6 towards Songgang (Shangwu) →
2F; Concourse	Lobby	Customer Service, Shops, Vending machines, ATMs
G	-	Exit

== Exits ==
Exit	Destination
Exit B	North Side of Beihuan Rd (E)
Exit C	South Side of Beihuan Rd (W)
Exit D	South Side of Beihuan Rd (E)
