= Line 6 (Shenzhen Metro) =

Metro line in Shenzhen, China

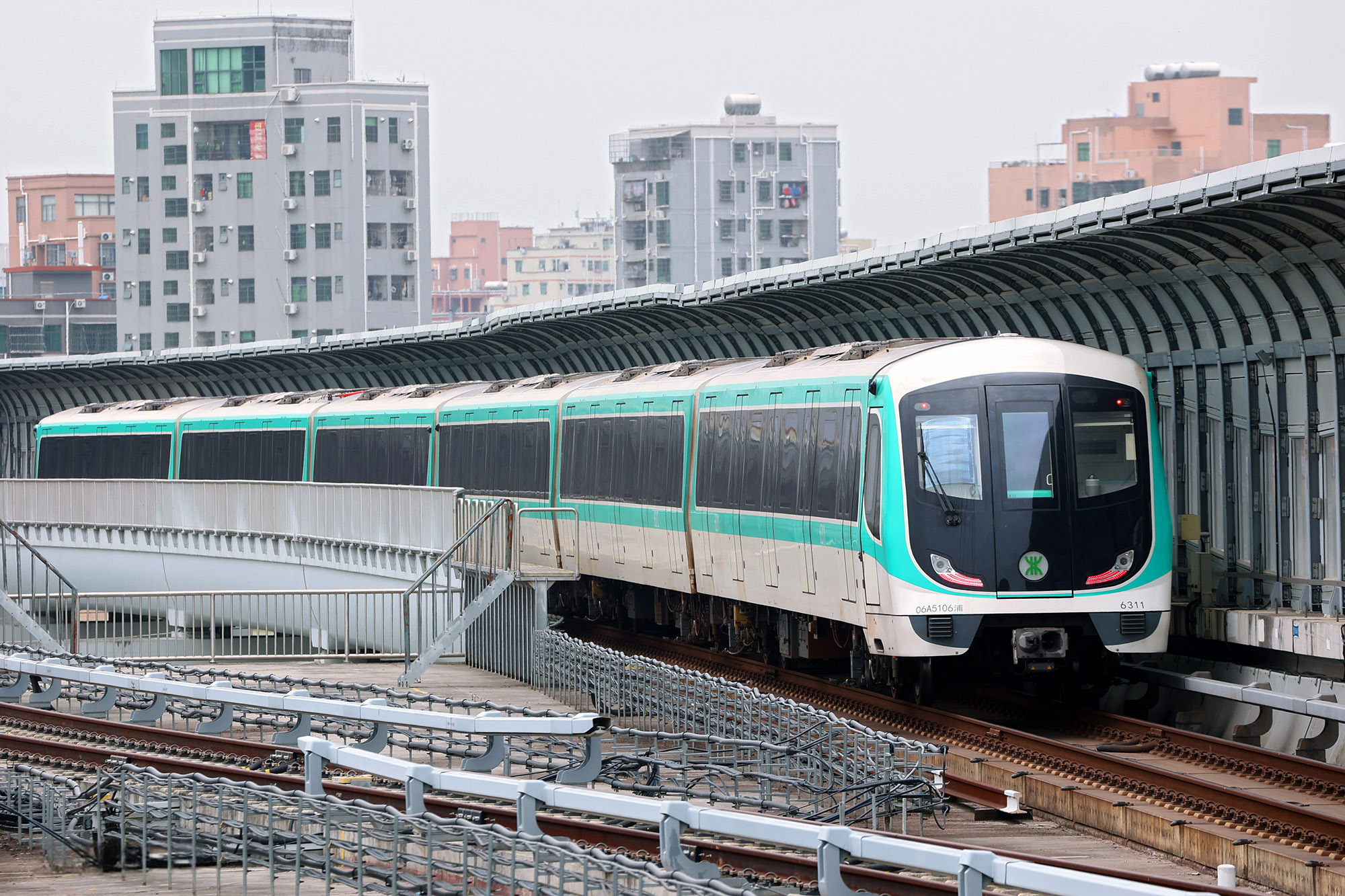
- Guangming station

Overview
- Status: In operation
- Locale: Shenzhen, China
- Termini: Science Museum; Songgang
- Stations: 27
- Color on map: Aquamarine (#3abca8)

Service
- Type: Rapid transit
- System: Shenzhen Metro
- Operator: SZMC (Shenzhen Metro Group)
- Depot(s): Changzhen depot Minle Stabling Yard
- Rolling stock: CRRC Puzhen (601-651)(6 cars, type A)

History
- Opened: 18 August 2020; 5 years ago

Technical
- Line length: 49.4 km (30.7 mi)
- Number of tracks: Double-track
- Character: Underground and elevated
- Track gauge: 1,435 mm (4 ft 8 1/2 in) standard gauge
- Electrification: 1,500 V DC third rail (overhead lines with same voltage installed in depot)
- Operating speed: 100 km/h (62 mph)
- Signalling: Urbalis 888 CBTC Moving block

Line 6 (simplified Chinese: 六号线; traditional Chinese: 六號線; pinyin: Liùhào Xiàn), also known as the Guangming line (simplified Chinese: 光明线; traditional Chinese: 光明線; pinyin: Guāngmíng Xiàn) of the Shenzhen Metro is in operation. Line 6 is part of the Phase III expansion of the Shenzhen Metro with a construction time frame scheduled for 2015–2019.

The first phase of Line 6 has a length of 37.6 km (23.4 mi) and a total of 20 stations. It connects Songgang to Shenzhen North station. The southern extension has a length of 11.8 km (7.3 mi) and 7 stations, from Shenzhen North station to Science Museum station. Construction of the first phase started in 2012, with both the original line and south extension opened on 18 August 2020. It is the second metro line in Shenzhen with an operating speed of over 100 km/h (62 mph). Guangming station (formerly known as Cuihu) will have provision for interchange with Dongguan Rail Transit Line 1 which is also under construction. It is envisioned to serve as an interchange with Line 1 and Line 4 of the Dongguan Rail Transit system.

== History ==
Line 6 had a planning history of over 20 years with major design changes along the way. In the 1994 "Shenzhen Urban Passenger Transport Master Plan", Line 6 was a metro line proposed to start from Bao'an International Airport to Songgang, with a line length of about 15 km (9.3 mi). It was envisioned as an extension of the still under planning Line 1 to connect the industrial and manufacturing centers of the then Bao'an County with the Bao'an Airport and the Special Economic Zones of Shenzhen. At the time Bao'an was not part of the Shenzhen Special Economic Zone, the purpose of Line 6 was to promote the development into Bao'an's western corridor and the northern industrial hinterland by extending the reach of the Shenzhen Metro.

In 2001, Line 6 was proposed to be extended south to Xixiang Subdistrict and east to Gongming Subdistrict creating a 37.5 km (23.3 mi) long line with 16 stations. At that point the alignment of Line 6 bears more resemblance to today's Line 11. By 2003, Line 6 was again redesigned into a 51.8 km (32.2 mi), 15 station, commuter railway in a "∩" shape connecting the Airport with Longhua District via Songgang. With the eastern leg of the "∩" replacing one of the then proposed Line 4 branches, the other which remained a section of Line 4 heading to Qinghu. In 2003, The line was again redesigned back into a metro line from Shenzhen North Railway Station to Songgang with a length of 37.2 km (23.1 mi), and 19 stations with a branch line north to Dongguan. This is the first incarnation of Line 6 that resembles its alignment today.

In 2011, an additional station, Cuihu (formerly called Lilin), was added between the Guangming Center station and Guangming North station. This was done in anticipation for interchange with Dongguan Rail Transit Line 1 which will now take over the branch line to Dongguan. In order to promote better transport integration and economic development between Dongguan and Shenzhen with the relevant departments of the two cities working together in rail transit planning. During the construction of Line 4 in 2007 to 2011, Shangtang Station reserved space for extra platforms and tracks for cross-platform interchange with Line 6. The station was to be rearranged to accommodate Line 6 when it was being constructed. In addition, Line 4's Longhua depot had supports built with decks designed for Line 6 to run over it. In 2012, Line 6 north of Shenzhen North Station was realigned one block east, dropping the plan to use all these provisions.

On April 10, 2012, Longhua District government held a symposium rail transit construction and the Shenzhen Urban Planning and Land Resources Committee issued the "Shenzhen rail transit planning (revision)". This revised Phase III plan showed that Line 6 will extend further south into central Shenzhen with six new stations, and an additional length of 11.5 kilometers. The Shenzhen Metro Phase III approved by the National Development and Reform Commission does not include the south extension of Line 6. However, in order to reduce the need for passengers heading to the city center to transfer into the already overcrowded Line 4, approval for the southern extension of Line 6 parallel to Line 4 was fast tracked. This extension will improve connectivity, by providing a direct line between Guangming and the city center, and provide relief for the congested Line 4 heading to and from Shenzhen North Station.

A spur to Guangmingcheng railway station was considered during the planning stage. This spur would have split off from line 6 at a junction just south of Changzhen station and then extend 3km along Guangqiao road to Guangmingcheng railway station possibly with an intermediate station at Guangbu road. The spur was dropped during the planning stage and it was decided that Guangmingcheng railway station would be served instead by lines 13 and 6b but it was nevertheless decided to future proof line 6 to potentially allow the spur to be added at a later date. This future proofing included space reserved at Guangmingcheng station and the partial construction on line 6 of the junction just south of Changzhen station.

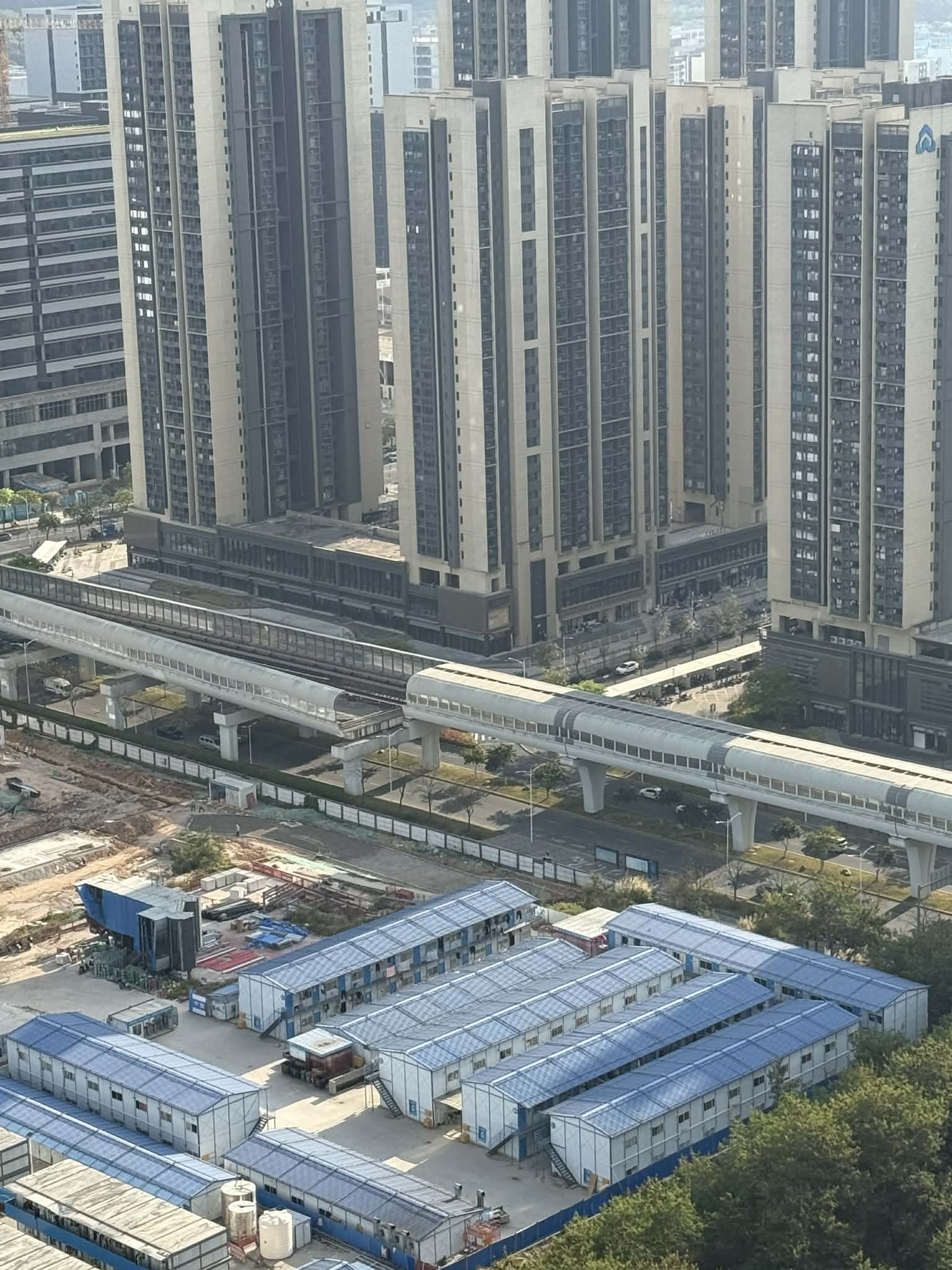
The unused spur line junction just south of Changzhen station.

== Construction ==
In 2010 the Shenzhen government and MTR Corporation signed a memorandum of cooperation on the construction operation of Line 6 for 30 years under the BOT procurement strategy, similar to Line 4. Funding was approved in April 2013 and construction of the first phase from Shenzhen North Station to Songgang officially started on August 25, 2015, with completion by June 2020. However, due to later negotiation failures between the two parties, Shenzhen Metro Corporation took over the project themselves without the BOT contract as planned.

A notable feature of the project is the section of Line 6 that crosses over Line 4 between Hongshan and Shangtang stations. The angle between the alignments of the two lines is only 11.3°. This means there is significant overlap between the elevated structures of both lines and Line 6 will need to span 100 meters in length order to cross over Line 4. This will be done with a large cable-stayed bridge supported by a single 92 meter high main pier and a bridge length of 140 meters. Making it the first cable-stayed bridge for a metro line for the Shenzhen Metro.

Construction of the Shenzhen section of Dongguan Rail Transit Line 1 started in 2018 as part of Shenzhen Metro's Phase IV expansion known as the "Line 6 branch line project".

== Service routes ==
- Science Museum — Songgang (Before 11:00 PM)
- Science Museum — Yangtai Mountain East (Working days peak hours only)
- Science Museum — Changzhen (From 11:00 PM to 11:30 PM)
- Songgang — Meilinguan (From 11:00 PM to 11:30 PM)

== Stations ==
- M - main line services (Before 11:00 PM)
- S1 - Short line services 1 (From 11:00 PM to 11:30 PM)
- S2 - Short line services 2 (From 11:00 PM to 11:30 PM)

M	S1	S2	Station name		Connections	Nearby bus stops	Distance km	Location
M	S1	S2	English	Chinese	Connections	Nearby bus stops	Distance km	Location
●		●	Songgang	松岗	11 12	B900 B933 B941 B980 M178 M255 M291 M490 M494 M512 M513		Bao'an
●		●	Xitou	溪头		B980 M494 M512 M513		Bao'an
●		●	Songgang Park	松岗公园		Dongguan 241（莞241）		Bao'an
●		●	Shutianpu	薯田埔				Guangming
●		●	Heshuikou	合水口				Guangming
●		●	Gongming Square	公明广场	13	B978 E19 M218 M234 M256 M337 M490 M548 Peak-time 121（高峰121）		Guangming
●		●	Honghuashan	红花山				Guangming
●		●	Loucun	楼村		720 B975 E15		Guangming
●		●	Science Park	科学公园				Guangming
●		●	Guangming	光明	6B			Guangming
●		●	Guangming Street	光明大街		720 B949 B963 E39 M166 M206 M356 M451 M525 M532 M596 Peak-express 33（高快33） Hongqiao Park-holiday 1（虹桥公园假日1） Hongqiao Park-holiday 2（虹桥公园假日2） Dongguan 747（莞747）		Guangming
●	●	●	Fenghuang Town	凤凰城	13	B926 B967 B971 B977 E39 M337 M356 M387 M451 M462 M525 M529 NA6 Peak-express 33（高快33） Peak-time 167（高峰167） Hongqiao Park-holiday 1（虹桥公园假日1） Dongguan 747（莞747）		Guangming
●	●		Changzhen	长圳		B926 B947 B959 B971 B979 M218 M356 M451		Guangming
●	●		Shangwu	上屋	13	316 767 B934 B986 M379 M551 M582 Peak-express 49（高快49） Peak-express 51（高快51）		Bao'an
●	●		Guantian	官田		316 789 791 882 E18 M145 M193 M233 M257 M262 M310 M341 M378 M379 M395 M548 M551 M582 Peak-express 31（高快31） Peak-time 43（高峰43） Peak-time 45（高峰45）		Bao'an
●	●		Yangtai Mountain East	阳台山东		624 882 B606 B906 E12 E34 E36 E40 M193 M233 M244 M262 M301 M310 M352 M370 M378 M379 M415 M420 M462 M548 Peak-time 43（高峰43） Peak-time 45（高峰45）		Longhua
●	●		Yuanfen	元芬		612 624 882 E36 E40 M193 M233 M244 M310 M340 M341 M352 M378 M379 M415 M462 M548		Longhua
●	●		Shangfen	上芬		M156 M204 M301 M341 M415 M420 M462 Peak-time 92（高峰92）		Longhua
●	●		Hongshan	红山	4	43 B917A B917B M115 M130 M204 M352 M379 M381 M420 Peak-time 21（高峰21）		Longhua
●	●		Shenzhen North	深圳北站	4 5 IOQ	75 81 B917A E7 E11 E22 M130 M207 M217 M225 M299 M300 M339 M340 M341 M347 M352 M353 M354 M363 M365-anticlockwise（M365外环） M385 M393 M405 M459 M462 M477 M566 M567 M572 M579 M597 Peak-time 120（高峰120） Peak-time 137（高峰137）		Longhua
●	●		Meilinguan	梅林关	4 (via Minle)	7 34		Longhua
●	●		Hanling	翰岭				Futian
●	●		Yinhu	银湖	9	4 5 218 236 B614 E11 M137 M152 M198 M203 M358 M364 M417 M437 M454 M476 M584 Peak-time 33（高峰33） Peak-time 221（高峰221）		Luohu
●	●		Bagualing	八卦岭	7	4 323 E5 E10 M152 M198 M584 Peak-time 33（高峰33）		Futian
●	●		Sports Center	体育中心		4 8 11 12 58 111 216 222 323 357 E5 E11 M138 M198 M203 M207 M213 M329 M401 M584 Peak-time 29（高峰29） Peak-time 33（高峰33）		Futian
●	●		Tongxinling	通新岭	3	4 8 9 10 12 13 64 65 80 108 123 202 207 225 303 375 383 393 B622 K105 M370 M389 M476 M481 N6 N17		Futian
●	●		Science Museum	科学馆	1	3 4 14 23 29 62 75 104 111 113 204 215 223 357 377 B930 M102 M106 M112 M133 M190 M192 M202 M383 M584 NA1 Peak-express 60（高快60） Peak-time 29（高峰29）		Futian

=== Branch ===
Despite being nominally the branch of Line 6, it is actually a separate line, whose color, train type and train numbers are all separated from those of the main line. The section from Shenzhen University of Advanced Technology to Guangming opened on 28 November 2022, and the section from Guangming to Guangmingcheng opened on 28 September 2025.

== Rolling stock ==
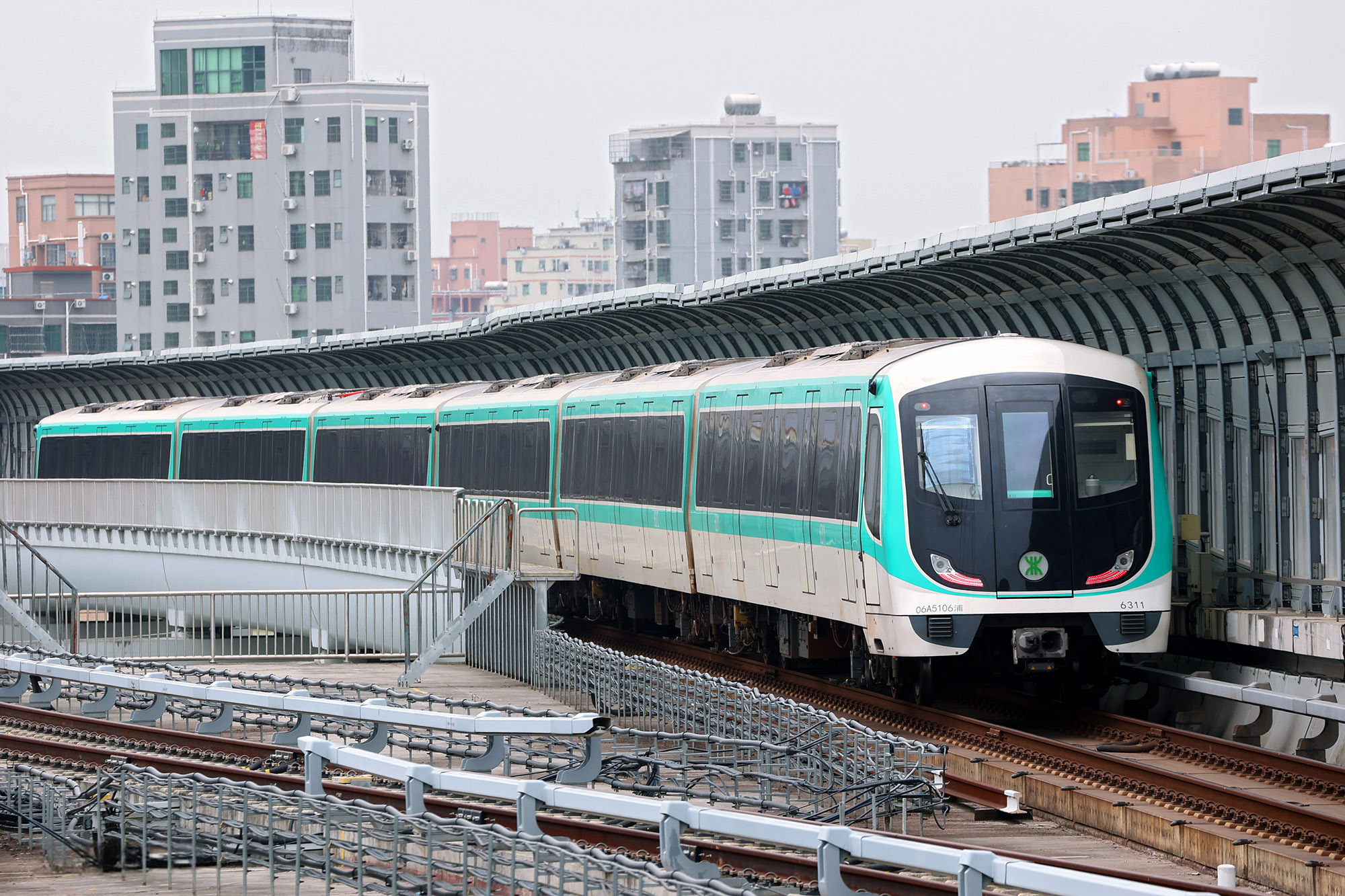
Line 6 train

Type	Date of manufacture	Series	Sets	Serial number	Assembly	Notes
Type A	2019–2020	A-size stock	51	0601-0651	Tc+Mp+M+M+Mp+Tc	Manufactured by CRRC Nanjing Puzhen
