= Merchiston International School =

Independent school in Shenzhen, China

- 深圳曼彻斯通城堡学校

Location
- No.12 Shilongzai Road, Dalang Sub-District, Longhua District, Shenzhen; China
- Coordinates: 22.70545°N 113.98211°E

Information
- Type: Private boarding and day school
- Motto: Ready Ay Ready
- Established: 2018; 8 years ago
- Headmaster: Chris Lynn
- Staff: 66 (approx) full and part time
- Gender: Boys and girls
- Age: 4 to 18
- Language: English, Mandarin
- Houses: Pringle; Chalmers; Rogerson
- Colours: Navy, red & white
- School fees: £20,539-£37,257 per year
- Affiliation: Merchiston Castle School
- Website: www.merchiston.cn

Merchiston International School
- Simplified Chinese: 深圳曼彻斯通城堡学校
- Traditional Chinese: 深圳曼徹斯通城堡學校
- Literal meaning: Shenzhen Merchiston Castle School
Transcriptions
Standard Mandarin
- Hanyu Pinyin: Shēnzhèn Mànsītōng Chéngbǎo Xuéxiào
Yue: Cantonese
- Jyutping: sam1 zan3 maan6 cit3 si1 tung1 sing4 bou2 hok6 haau6

Merchiston International School (Chinese: 深圳曼彻斯通城堡学校) is an independent boarding school for boys and girls in the Longhua District in Shenzhen, China. It is open to students aged 4 to 18 as either boarding or day students, though the senior school is only for boarding students; it was modelled after English public schools. It is affiliated with, and is the first overseas campus for Merchiston Castle School, in Edinburgh, Scotland.

== Background ==
Merchiston Castle School developed Merchiston International School after a year of collaboration with Chinese investor Lyu Jianjun, whose son attended the boarding school in Edinburgh. In 2016, Shenzhen Merchiston International Education Co. Ltd. was founded, and in August 2018, Merchiston International School opened its doors to pupils as the first school in Longhua District, Shenzhen, Guangdong province, China. On October 15, 2018, the school held its opening ceremony. The event attracted almost 1,000 attendees, including the Lord Provost of Edinburgh, Frank Ross.

The school offers student living arrangements along with a British education. The school can cater to 1,200 students aged 4–18. Lessons are taught in English and pupils from grades 1 to 9 follow the English national curriculum, with additional access to Mandarin language learning. Senior students study for the IGCSE and A-levels. With accommodations for 600, the senior school is exclusively for boarding students. 80 percent of the teaching staff are from the United Kingdom.
