= Bromsgrove School Mission Hills =

International school in Shenzhen, China

Bromsgrove-Mission Hills International School of Shenzhen
- Simplified Chinese: 深圳柏朗思观澜湖外籍人员子女学校
- Traditional Chinese: 深圳柏朗思觀瀾湖外籍人員子女學校
- Literal meaning: Shenzhen Bromsgrove Mission Hills Foreign Workers' Children School
Transcriptions
Standard Mandarin
- Hanyu Pinyin: Shēnzhèn Bólǎngsī Guānlán Hú Wàijí Rényuán Zǐnǚ Xuéxiào
Yue: Cantonese
- Jyutping: sam1 zan3 baak3 long5 si1 gun1 laan4 wu4 ngoi6 zik6 jan4 jyun4 zi2 neoi5 hok6 haau6

Bromsgrove School Mission Hills
- Simplified Chinese: 柏朗思观澜湖学校
- Traditional Chinese: 柏朗思觀瀾湖學校
Transcriptions
Standard Mandarin
- Hanyu Pinyin: Bólǎngsī Guānlán Hú Xuéxiào
Yue: Cantonese
- Jyutping: baak3 long5 si1 gun1 laan4 wu4 hok6 haau6

Bromsgrove School Mission Hills, also known as Bromsgrove-Mission Hills International School of Shenzhen (BMH), is a British international bilingual school in Longhua District, Shenzhen, Guangdong, China, affiliated with Bromsgrove School in the United Kingdom and the Chinese leisure and hospitality company Mission Hills Group. Peter Clague is the headmaster as of 2019.

It is one of eight schools in Shenzhen designated for the children of foreign personnel as of 2018. Anna Packman is the Head of both the Pre and Prep school. BMH is open to Chinese students.

The Prep school currently has classes from Prep 1 to Prep 5 (2018-2019). In the 2019-20 school year, BMH will add Prep 6. There is a homeroom teacher (English) and a co-teacher in P1-3 classes (Chinese). This model will be changed for Prep 4-6 beginning in the 2019-2020 school year.

Chinese, English, Inquiry (bilingual), Maths (taught in Chinese), PE, Art, and Music are currently offered to Prep 1-5 students. The school's technology includes six iPads for each class and a computer lab with 24 desktop computers.

== See also ==
- Education in Shenzhen
