= Shangtang station =

Metro station in Shenzhen, China

Coordinates: 22°38′16″N 114°0′49″E

Shangtang 上塘
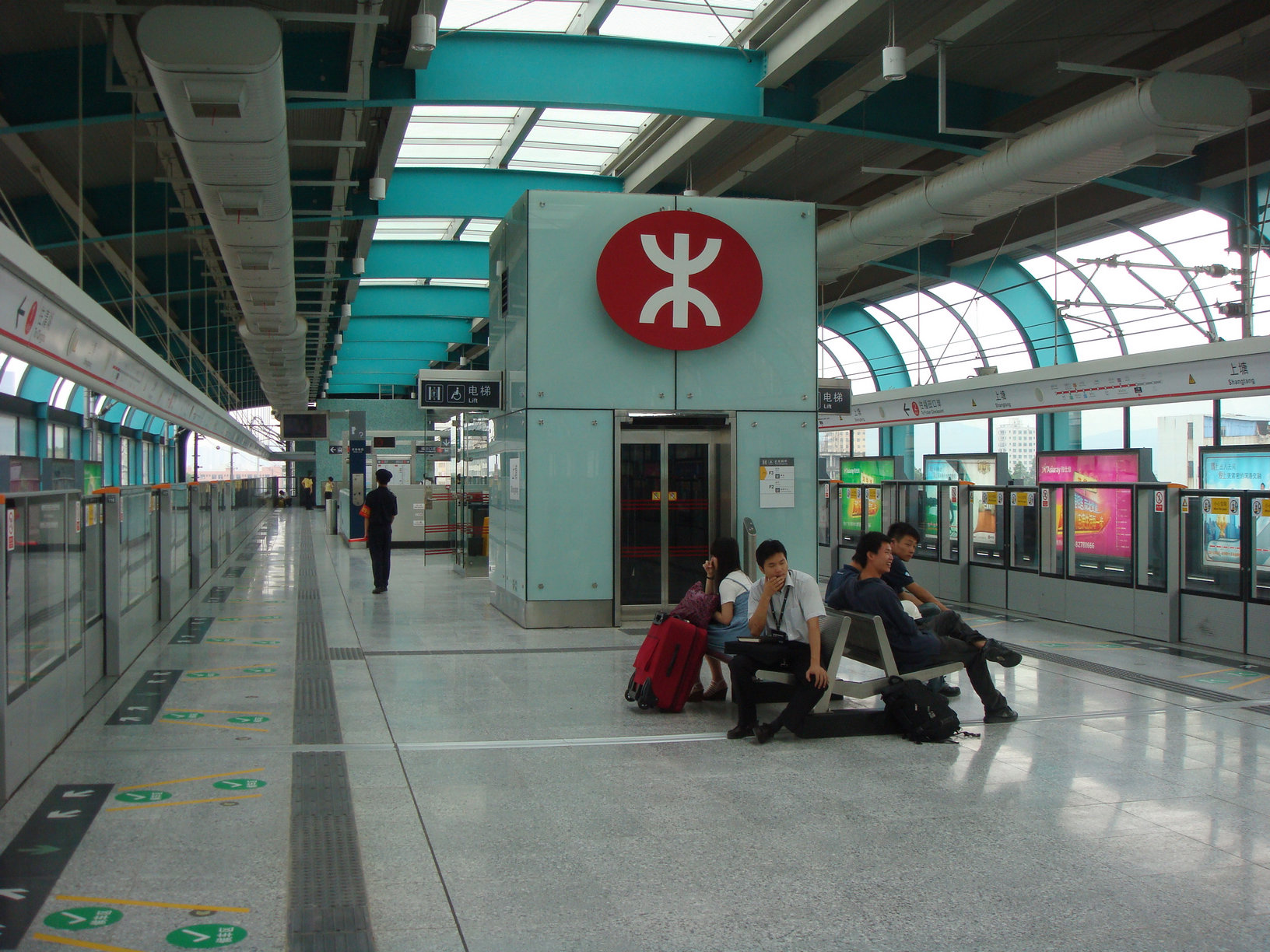

General information
- Location: Longhua District, Shenzhen, Guangdong; China
- Operated by: MTR Corporation (Shenzhen)
- Line: Line 4
- Platforms: 2 (1 island platform)
- Tracks: 2

Construction
- Structure type: Elevated
- Accessible: Yes

History
- Opened: 16 June 2011

Services
Preceding station	Shenzhen Metro	Following station
Longsheng towards Niuhu	Line 4	Hongshan towards Futian Checkpoint
Location

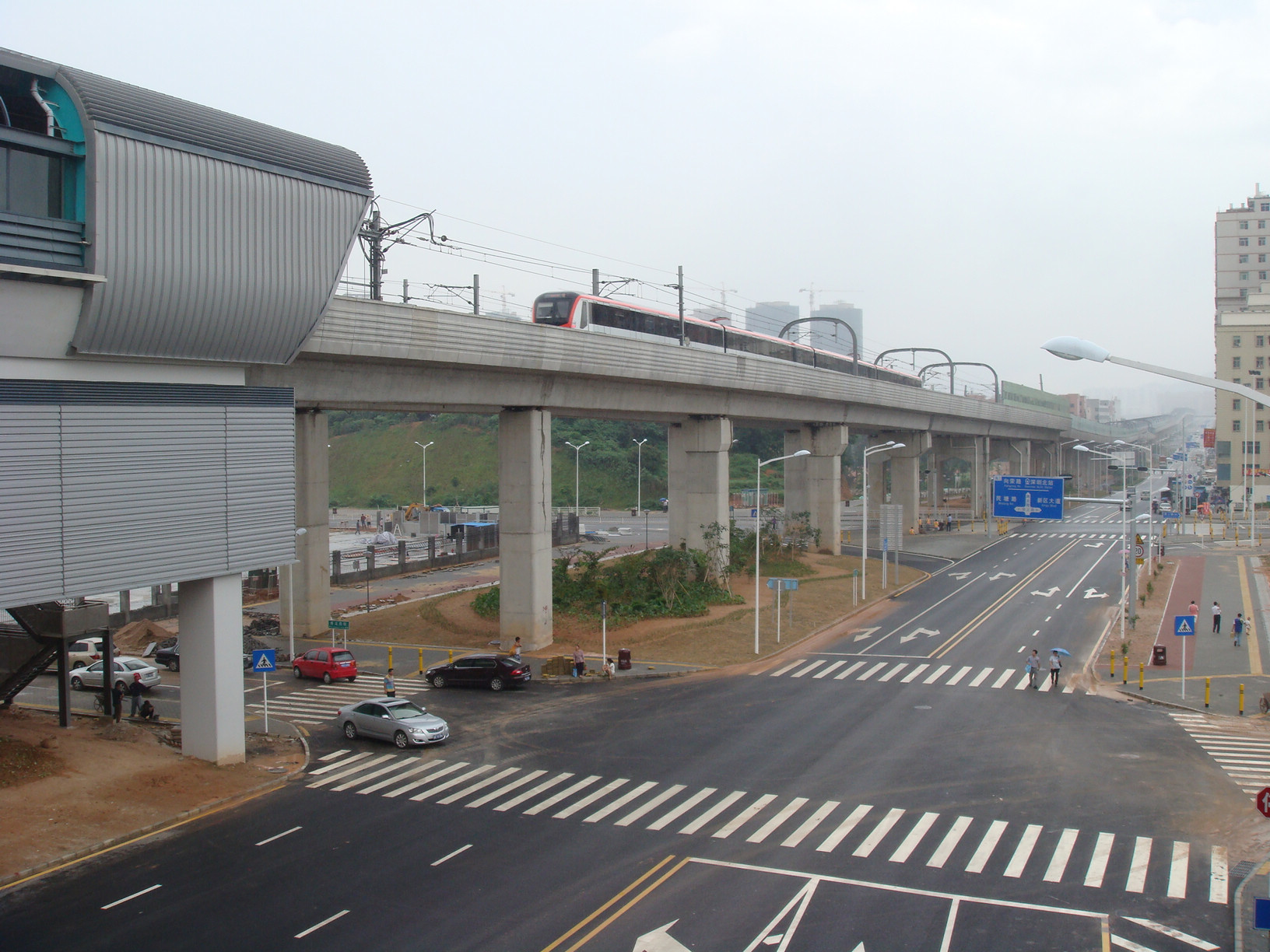
A train leaving Shangtang Station

Shangtang station (Chinese: 上塘站; pinyin: Shàngtáng Zhàn; Jyutping: soeng6 tong4 zaam6) is a station on Line 4 of the Shenzhen Metro. It opened on 16 June 2011. Space was reserved for extra platforms and tracks for cross-platform interchange with Line 6, however in 2012, the Line 6 route north of Shenzhen North Station was realigned one block east, dropping the plan to use these provisions.

== Station layout ==
3F; Platforms	Platform 2	← Line 4 towards Futian Checkpoint (Hongshan)
3F; Platforms	Island platform, doors will open on the left
3F; Platforms	Platform 1	→ Line 4 towards Niuhu (Longsheng) →
2F; Concourse	Lobby	Customer Service, Shops, Vending machines, ATMs
G	-	Exit

== Exits ==
Exit	Destination
Exit A	Tenglong Road (NE)
Exit B	Tenglong Road (NW), Qian Longman Haining
Exit C	Tenglong Road (SW), Jianshangcun, Longtangxincun
Exit D	Tenglong Road (SE), Royal Dragon Court
