= Longhua, Shenzhen =

Coordinates: 22°39′26.58″N 114°0′58.47″E

Longhua 龙华区
- District
- Longhua District
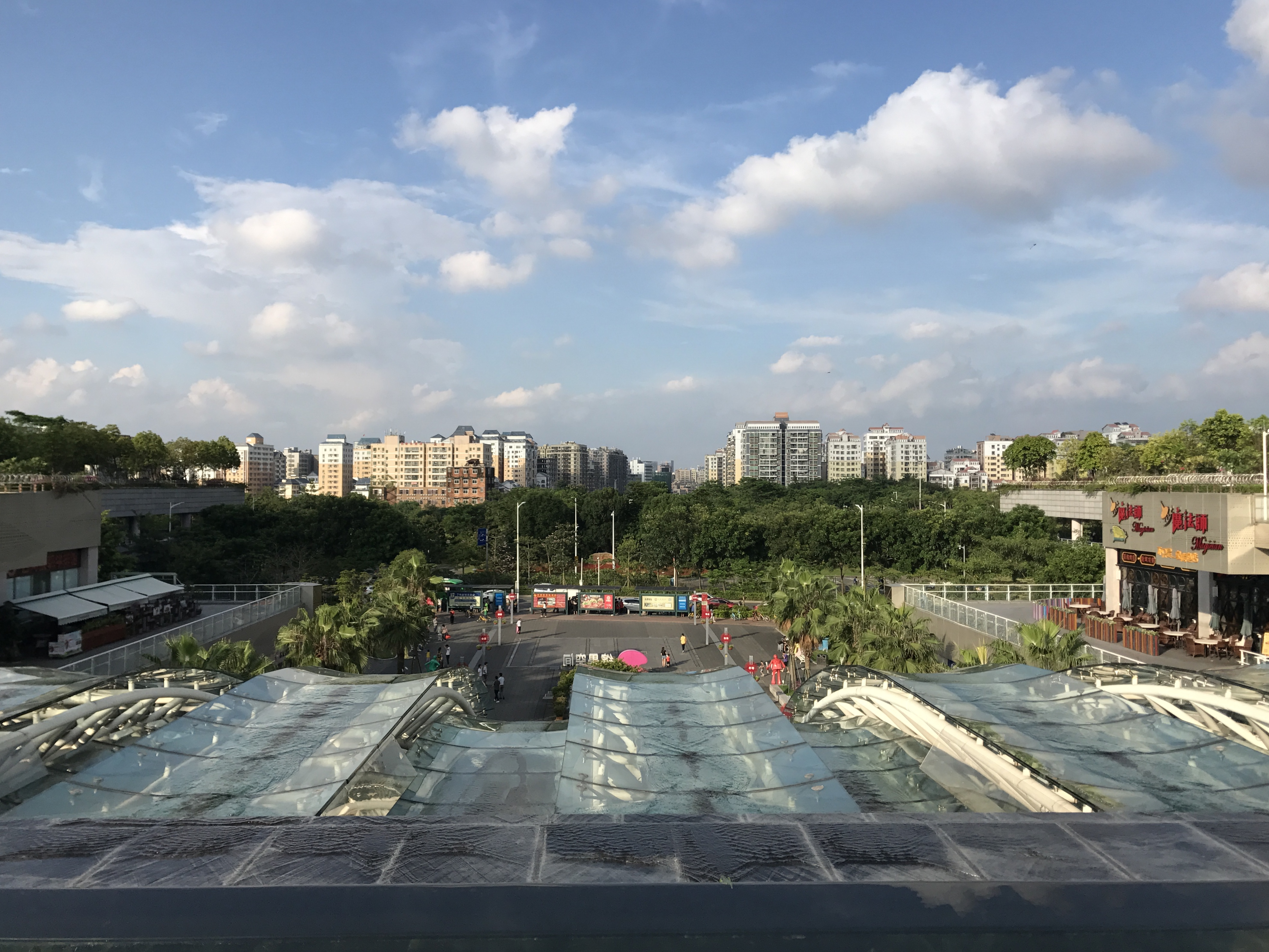
- Shenzhen North Station West Square

- Longhua (highlighted in yellow) in Shenzhen
- Interactive map of Longhua
- Country: People's Republic of China
- Province: Guangdong
- Sub-provincial city: Shenzhen

Area
  - Total: 176 km^{2} (68 sq mi)

Population (2020)
  - Total: 2,528,872
  - Density: 14,400/km^{2} (37,200/sq mi)
- Time zone: UTC+8 (China Standard)
- Postal code: 518110
- Area code: 0755
- Website: http://www.szlhq.gov.cn

Longhua, Shenzhen
- Simplified Chinese: 龙华区
- Traditional Chinese: 龍華區
- Guangdong Romanization: lung4 wa4 kêu1
- Hanyu Pinyin: Lónghuá Qū
Transcriptions
Standard Mandarin
- Hanyu Pinyin: Lónghuá Qū
Yue: Cantonese
- Yale Romanization: Lùhngwàh Kēui
- Jyutping: lung4 waa4 keoi1
- Canton Romanization: lung4 wa4 kêu1

Alternative Chinese name
- Simplified Chinese: 龙华
- Traditional Chinese: 龍華
- Guangdong Romanization: lung4 wa4
- Hanyu Pinyin: Lónghuá
Transcriptions
Standard Mandarin
- Hanyu Pinyin: Lónghuá
Yue: Cantonese
- Yale Romanization: Lùhngwàh
- Jyutping: lung4 waa4
- Canton Romanization: lung4 wa4

Longhua District is a district in Shenzhen, Guangdong, People's Republic of China. It was created as a new district on 30 December 2011, and became a formal district on 11 October 2016.

== History ==
Longhua was established as a new district on 30 December 2011 by the Shenzhen municipal government, being separated from Bao'an District. It was one of the four "new districts" established within Shenzhen (Longhua New District, Guangming New District, Pingshan New District and Dapeng New District), due to the rapid expansion of city urban area after the 2000s. It was still part of Bao'an District in administrative management. On 11 October 2016, Longhua was officially separated from Bao'an District and became a formal district on its own.

== Subdistricts ==
Name	Chinese (S)	Hanyu Pinyin	Canton Romanization	Population (2010)	Area (km^{2})
Longhua Subdistrict	龙华街道	Lónghuá Jiēdào	lung4 wa4 gai1 dou6	367,521	24.80
Minzhi Subdistrict	民治街道	Mínzhì Jiēdào	men4 ji6 gai1 dou6	281,652	30.69
Dalang Subdistrict	大浪街道	Dàlàng Jiēdào	dai6 long6 gai1 dou6	277,689	37.20
Guanlan Subdistrict	观澜街道	Guānlán Jiēdào	gun1 lan4 gai1 dou6	452,598	34.60
Fucheng Subdistrict	福城街道	Fúchéng Jiēdào	fug1 xing4 gai1 dou6		
Guanhu Subdistrict	观湖街道	Guānhú Jiēdào	gun1 wu4 gai1 dou6		

== Geography ==
By the end of 2012, Longhua District covered an area of 175.58 square kilometres. The new district is situated in the north part of Shenzhen city, and lying on the middle vertical main axis of the city, being just north of the Futian CBD, Shenzhen. It borders Dongguan City to the north.

== Economy ==
Longhua District is one of the main production bases in Shenzhen. It consists of manufacturing industry, trading industries and information technology. Altogether forms an outward economic structure which is typical in Shenzhen Special Economic Zone.

== Transportation ==
Longhua is considered as a transportation hub within the city. It houses the Shenzhen North Railway Station, a high-speed railway station. Both the Guangzhou–Shenzhen–Hong Kong Express Rail Link, which connects Beijing and Hong Kong (Kowloon), and the Xiamen–Shenzhen railway, runs through the station.

=== Shenzhen Metro ===
Longhua is currently served by three metro lines and two light rail lines operated by Shenzhen Metro. These lines and their stations and connections are:

- Line 4 - Minle, Baishilong, Shenzhen North 5 6, Hongshan 6, Shangtang, Longsheng, Longhua, Qinghu
- Line 5 - Shenzhen North 4 6, Minzhi
- Line 6 - Meilinguan, Shenzhen North 4 5, Hongshan 4, Shangfen, Yuanfen, Yangtai Mountain East
- Tram Line 1 - Qinghu 4, Qinglong, Qinglong School, Meilong North, Bilan, Wenlan, Dahe, Century Pl, Jinli, Hexi, Guancheng, Dabutou, Hedong, Shijiaotou, Xialan 4
- Tram Line 2 - Qinghu 4, Qinglong, Qinglong School, Meilong North, Bilan, Wenlan, Dahe, Dongan, HTIP West, HTIP, HTIP East, Xiawei

== Property Development ==
A large part of Longhua District has also been heavily developed into a high end residential area, with recent property developments established on a mostly undeveloped land surrounding the Shenzhen North Railway Station. Parts of the old industrial areas in the district are also planned to be demolished and restructured into more residential area to cope with the rapid expansion of population in the district.

=== List of Private housing estates in Longhua ===
Longhua is an area with a high density of private housing estates. Some of the larger private housing estates in Longhua are:

- Lvjing 1866 - built by China LVGEM Property Holdings Limited (HKEX:0095)
- Lvjing Xiangsong - built by China LVGEM Property Holdings Limited (HKEX:0095)
- Shuixiechuntian - built by Top Spring International Holdings Limited (HKEX:3688)

== Education ==
Municipal schools operated by the Shenzhen Government

- Shenzhen Senior High School North Campus (北校区)
- Shenzhen Second Foreign Languages School (深圳第二外国语学校) - Dashuikeng Community, Guanlan Subdistrict

International schools

- Merchiston International School, a British international school, is in Longhua District.
- Bromsgrove School Mission Hills, a British international school, is in Longhua District.

== Attractions ==
Two provincial parks are located in Longhua District: Guanlan Renmin Park and Longhua Park.

== See also ==
- Guangdong
- Shenzhen
