= Songgang station =

Shenzhen Metro Lines 6, 11 and 12 station

Songgang 松岗
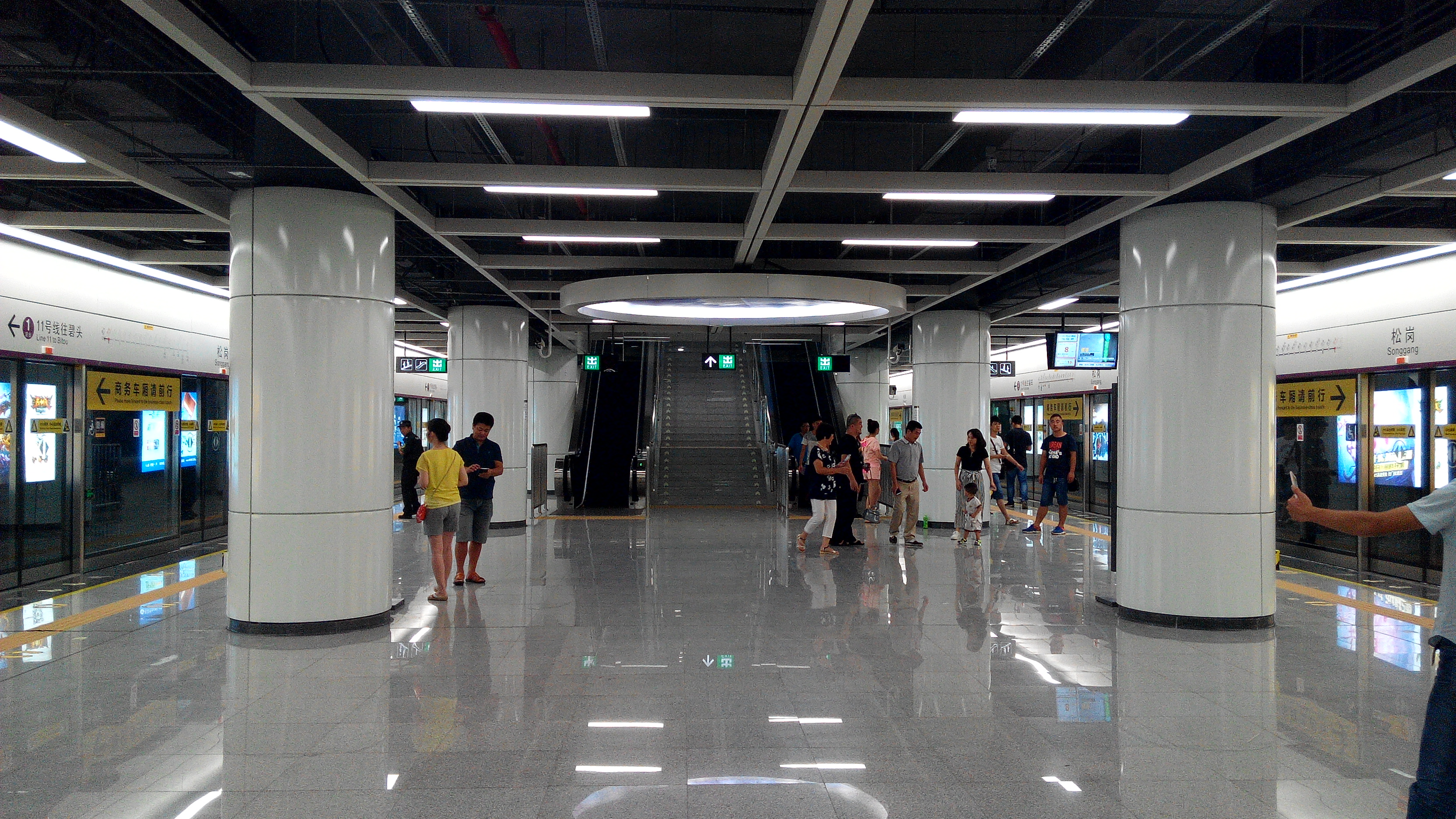
- Line 11 platform

Chinese name
- Traditional Chinese: 松崗
- Simplified Chinese: 松岗
Transcriptions
Standard Mandarin
- Hanyu Pinyin: Sōnggǎng
Yue: Cantonese
- Yale Romanization: Chùhnggōng
- Jyutping: Cung4gong1

General information
- Location: Bao'an District, Shenzhen, Guangdong; China
- Coordinates: 22°46′41″N 113°52′10″E
- Operated by: SZMC (Shenzhen Metro Group); Shenzhen Line 12 Rail Transit Co., Ltd (Shenzhen Metro Group and PowerChina PPP)
- Lines: Line 6; Line 11; Line 12
- Platforms: 8 (2 island platforms and 4 side platforms)
- Tracks: 6

Construction
- Structure type: Underground
- Accessible: Yes

History
- Opened: Line 11: 28 June 2016 (9 years ago); Line 6: 18 August 2020 (5 years ago); Line 12: 28 December 2024 (17 months ago)

Services
Preceding station	Shenzhen Metro	Following station
Terminus	Line 6	Xitou towards Science Museum
Bitou Terminus	Line 11	Houting towards Hongling South
Terminus	Line 12	Langxia towards Zuopaotai East
Location

Songgang station (simplified Chinese: 松岗站; traditional Chinese: 松崗站; pinyin: Sōnggǎng Zhàn; Jyutping: Cung4 gong1 zaam6; Cantonese Yale: Chùhnggōng Jaahm) is an interchange station between Line 6, Line 11 and Line 12 of the Shenzhen Metro. Line 11 platforms opened on 28 June 2016, Line 6 platforms opened on August 18, 2020 and Line 12 platforms opened on 28 December 2024.

== Station layout ==
G	-	Exits
B1F; Concourse	Lobby	Ticket Machines, Customer Service, Shops, Vending Machines
B2F; 11 Platforms	Platform	11 towards Bitou (Terminus)
B2F; 11 Platforms	Island platform, doors will open on the left
B2F; 11 Platforms	Platform	11 towards Hongling South (Houting)
B3F; 6 Platforms	Side platform, doors will open on the right
B3F; 6 Platforms	Platform	6 towards Science Museum (Xitou)
B3F; 6 Platforms	Platform	6 termination platform
B3F; 6 Platforms	Side platform, doors will open on the right
B4F; 12 Platforms
B4F; 12 Platforms	Side platform, doors will open on the right for alighting only
B4F; 12 Platforms	Platform	12 towards Zuopaotai East (Langxia)
B4F; 12 Platforms	Island platform, doors will open on the left or right for boarding only
B4F; 12 Platforms	Platform	12 towards Zuopaotai East (Langxia)
B4F; 12 Platforms	Side platform, doors will open on the left for alighting only

=== Entrances/exits ===
The station had 6 points of entry/exit (A, C, D, E, F, G) when Line 6 and Line 11 opened. When Line 12 opened, 3 new points of entry/exit were constructed (H, K, L). The entrances for both parts are not connected. The station has bus stops at Exits C and G. Exits C, G, H and K are accessible via elevators.

- A: Bao'an Boulevard
- ~~B~~: Bao'an Boulevard (not open)
- C: Bao'an Boulevard, Shajiang Road
- D: Xitou Industrial 4th Road
- E: Bao'an Boulevard
- F: Bao'an Boulevard
- G: Shajiang Road
- H: Shajiang Road
- ~~J~~: Shajiang Road (not open)
- K: Shajiang Road
- L: Shajiang Road
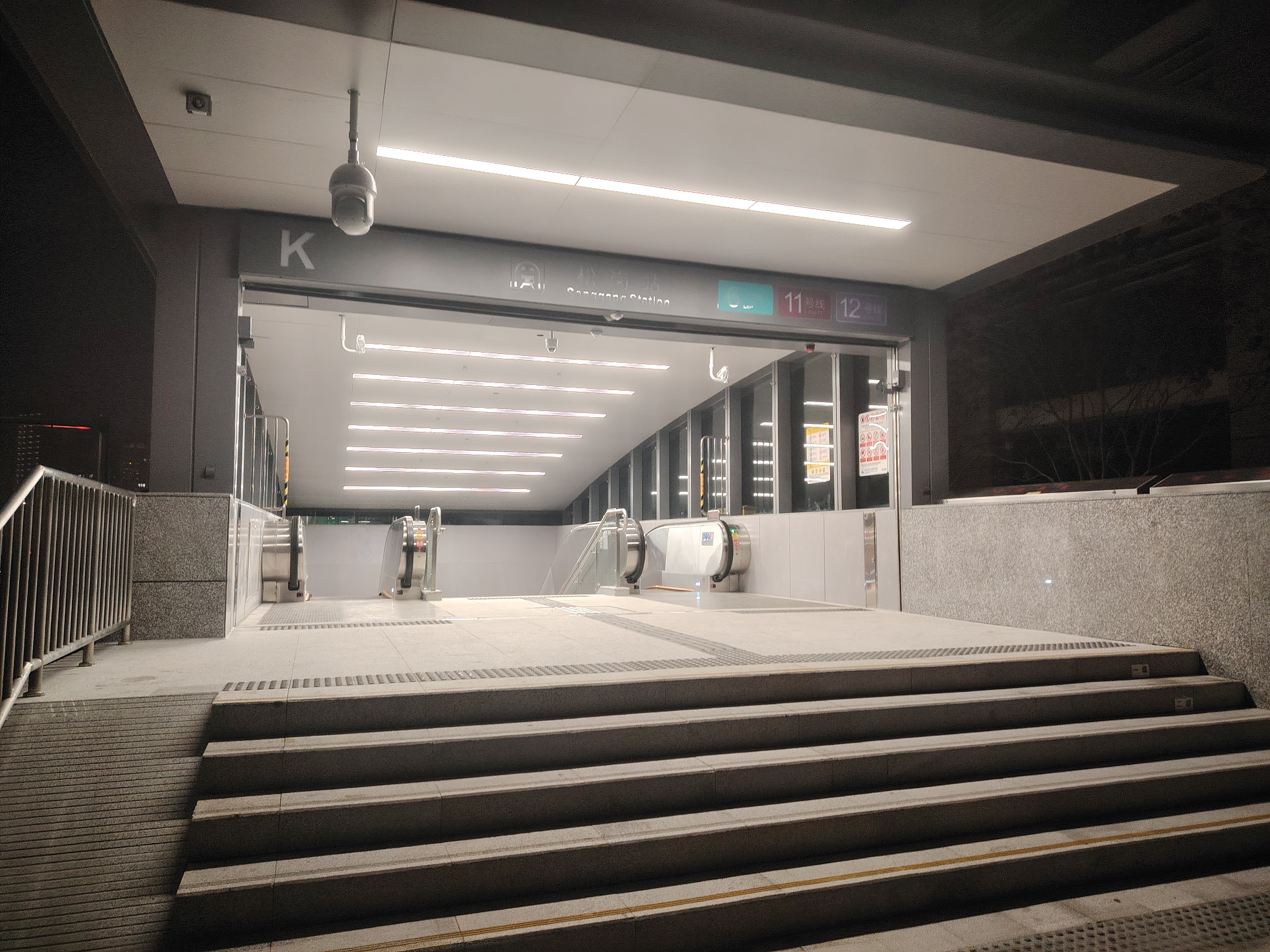
Entrance K

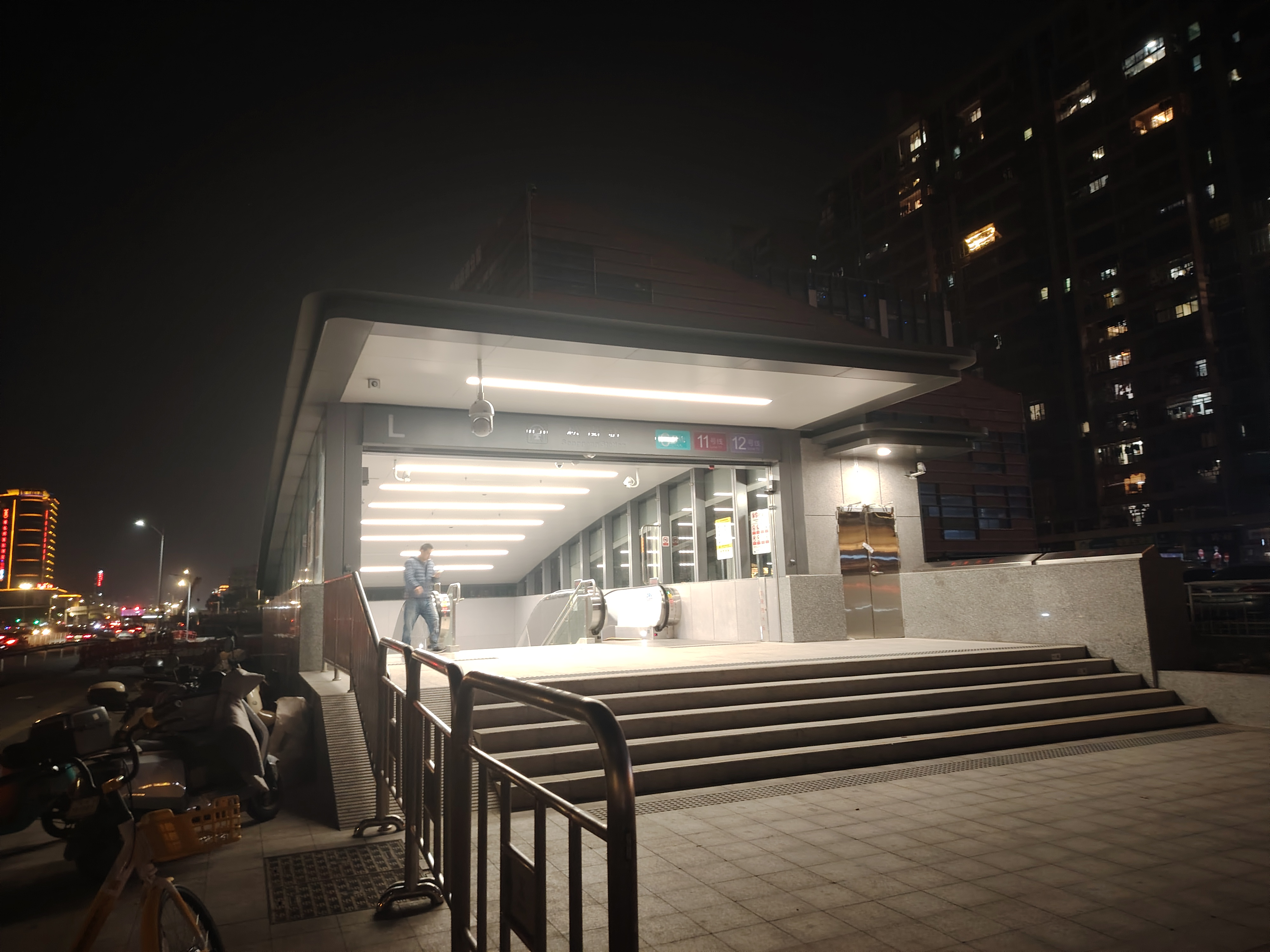
Entrance L

== Gallery ==
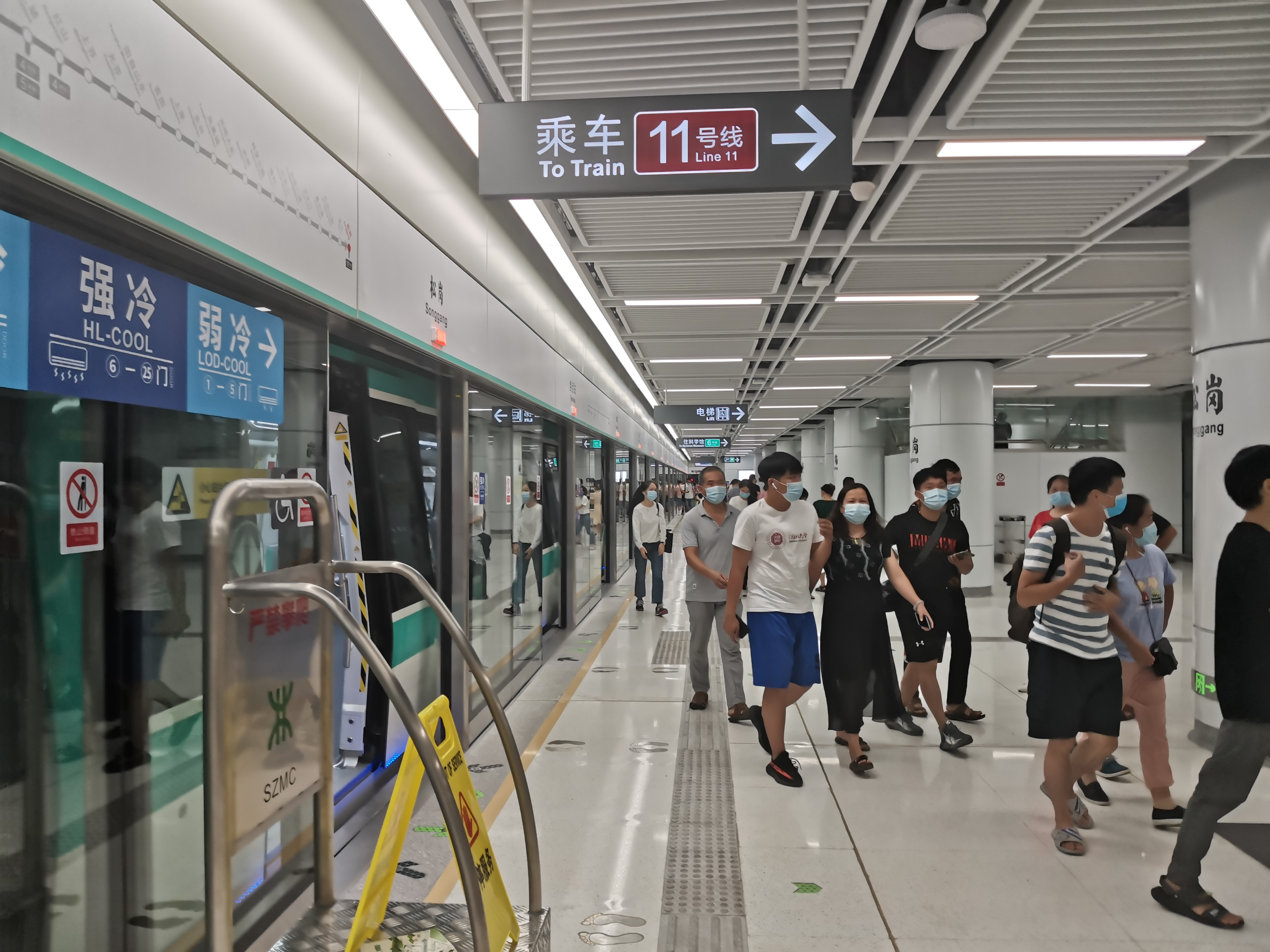
Line 6 terminating platform

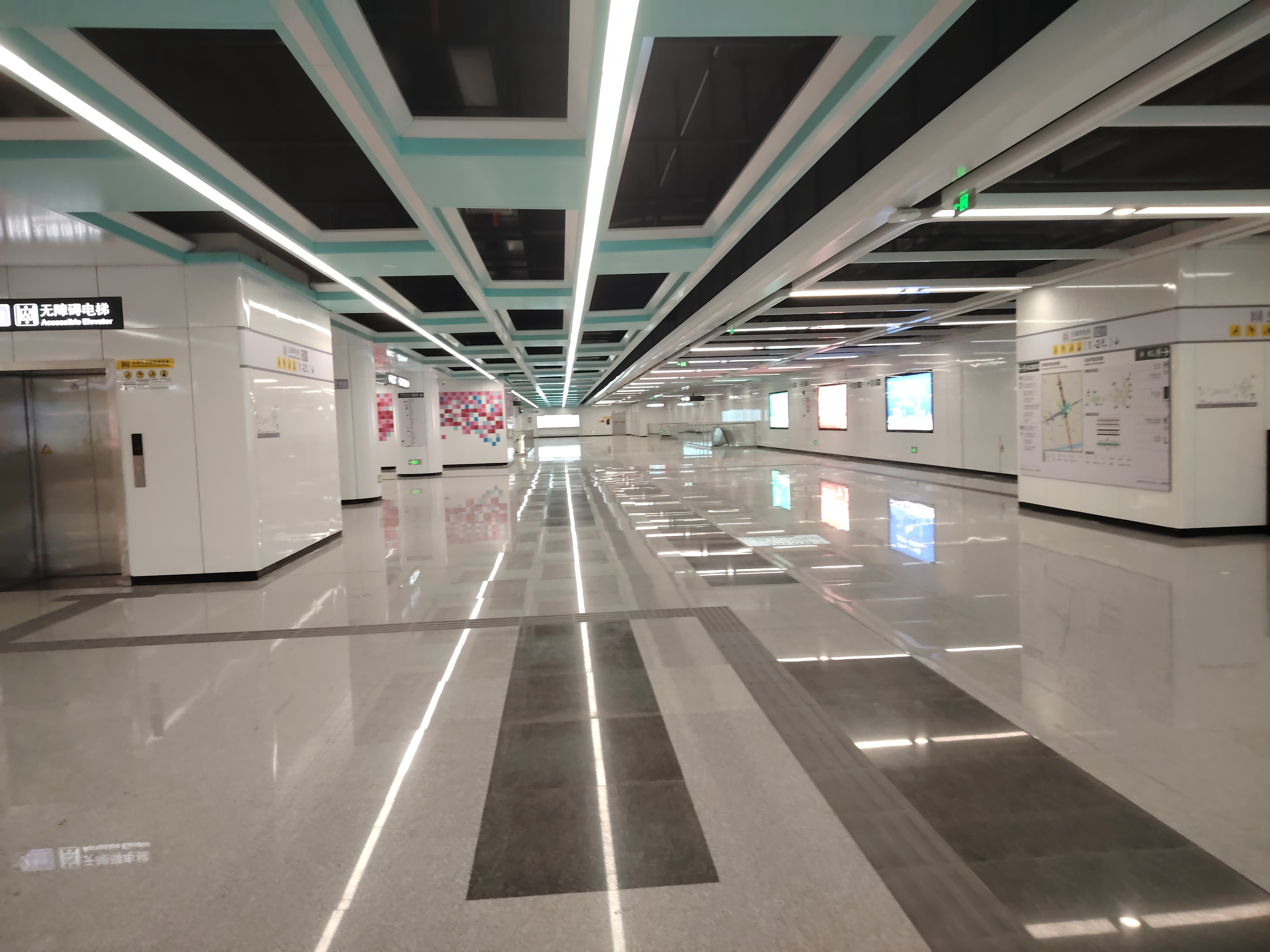
Line 12 concourse

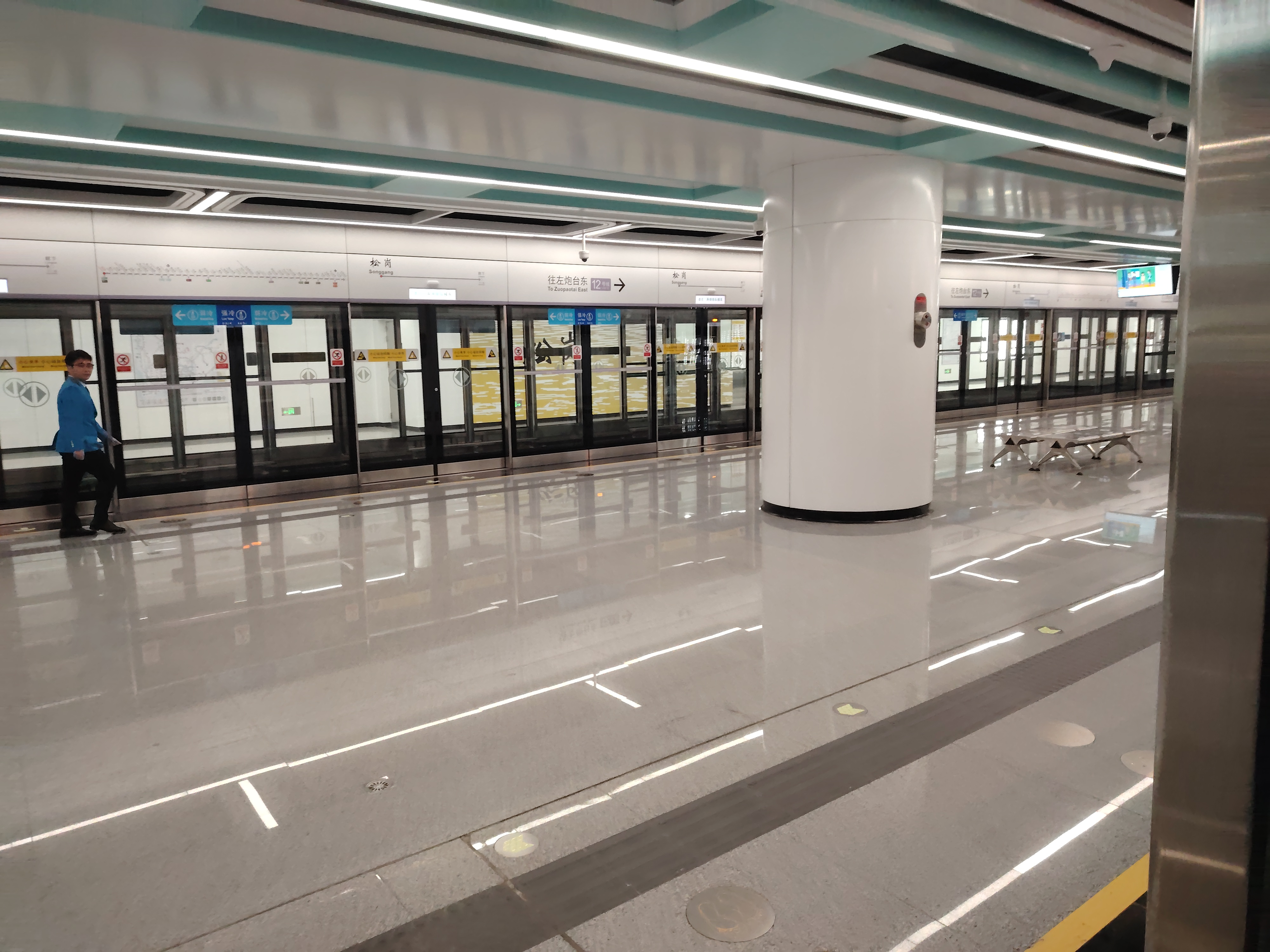
Line 12 island boarding platform

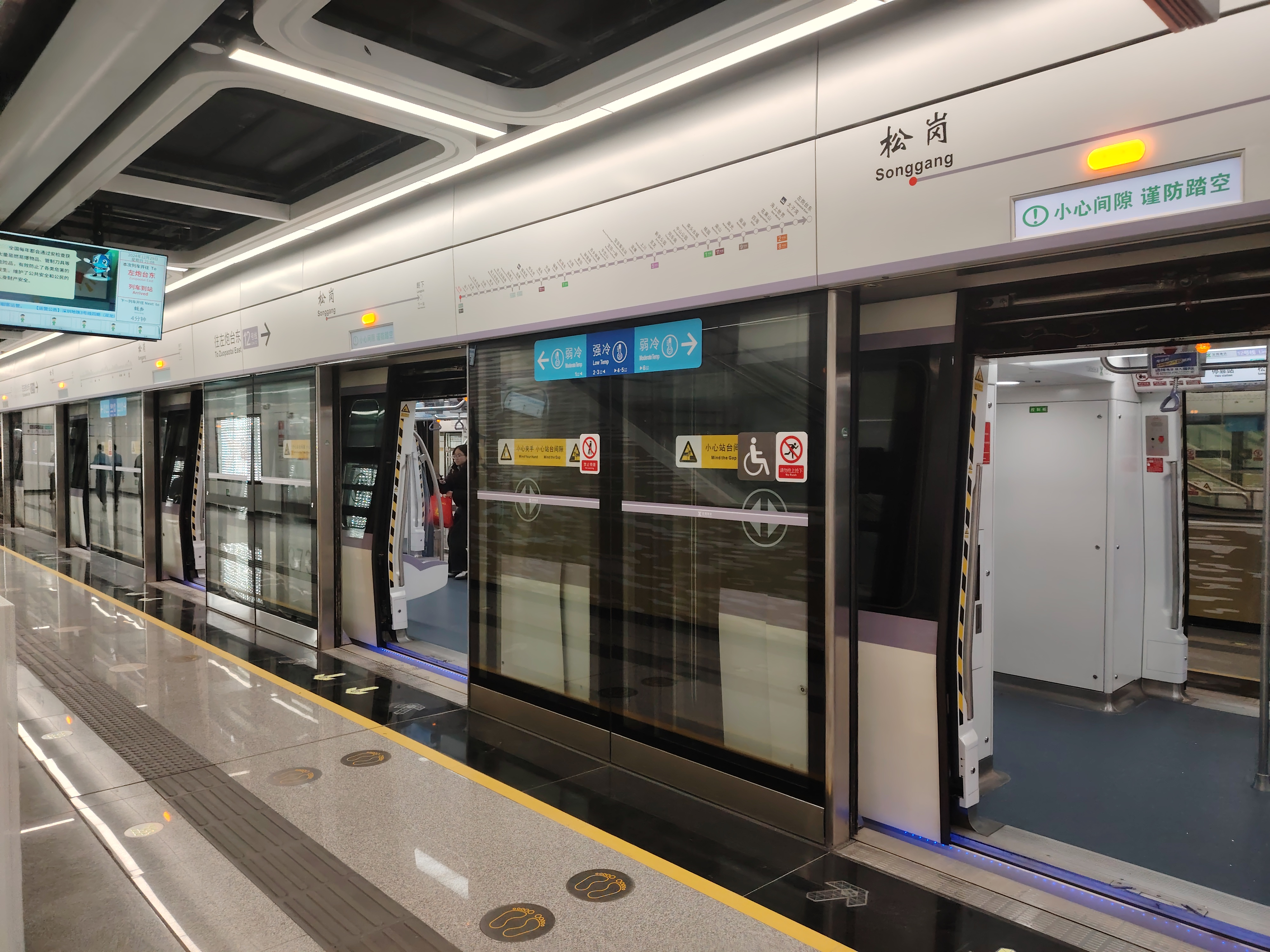
Line 12 side alighting platform

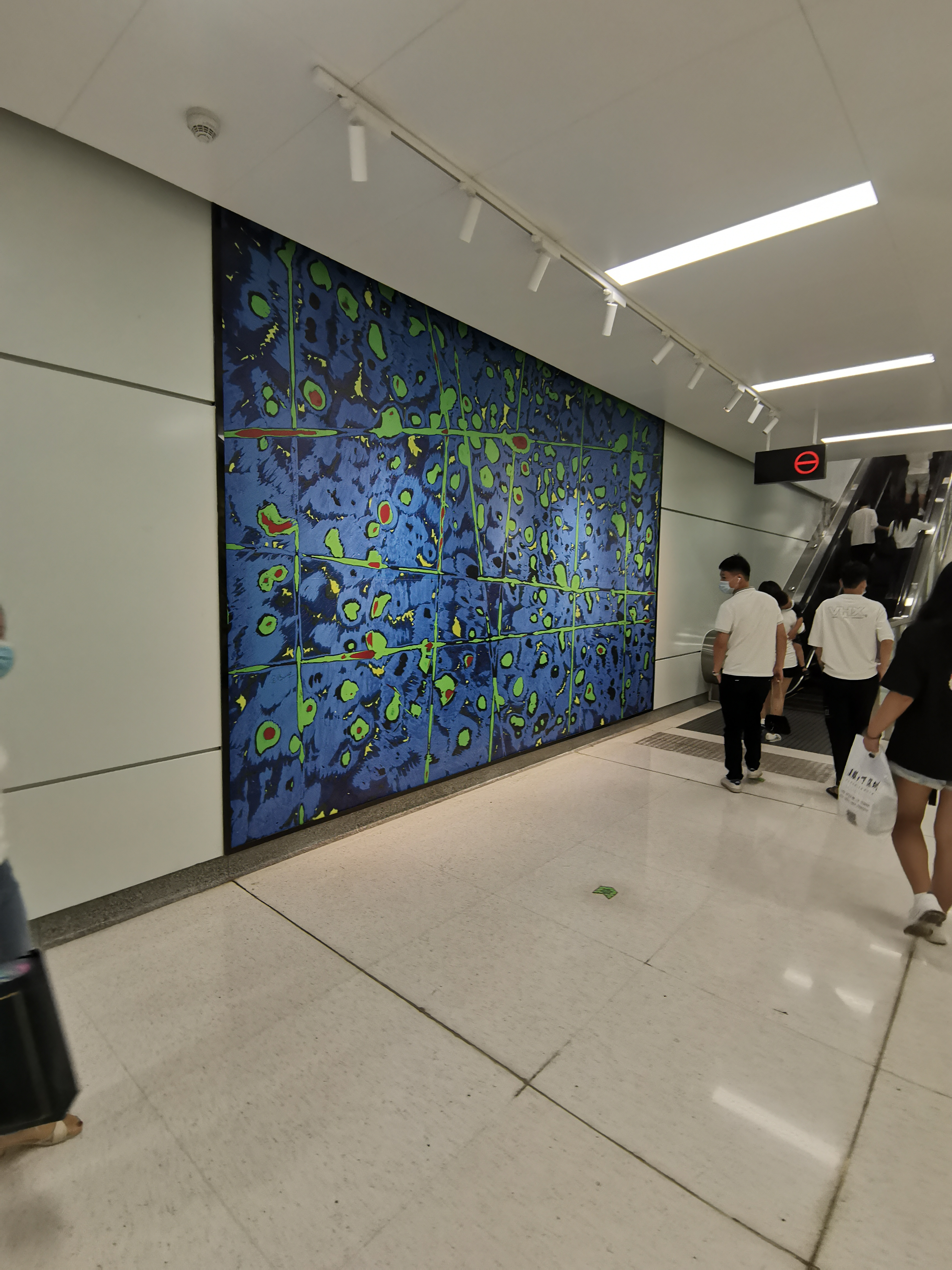
Line 6 platform culture wall 1

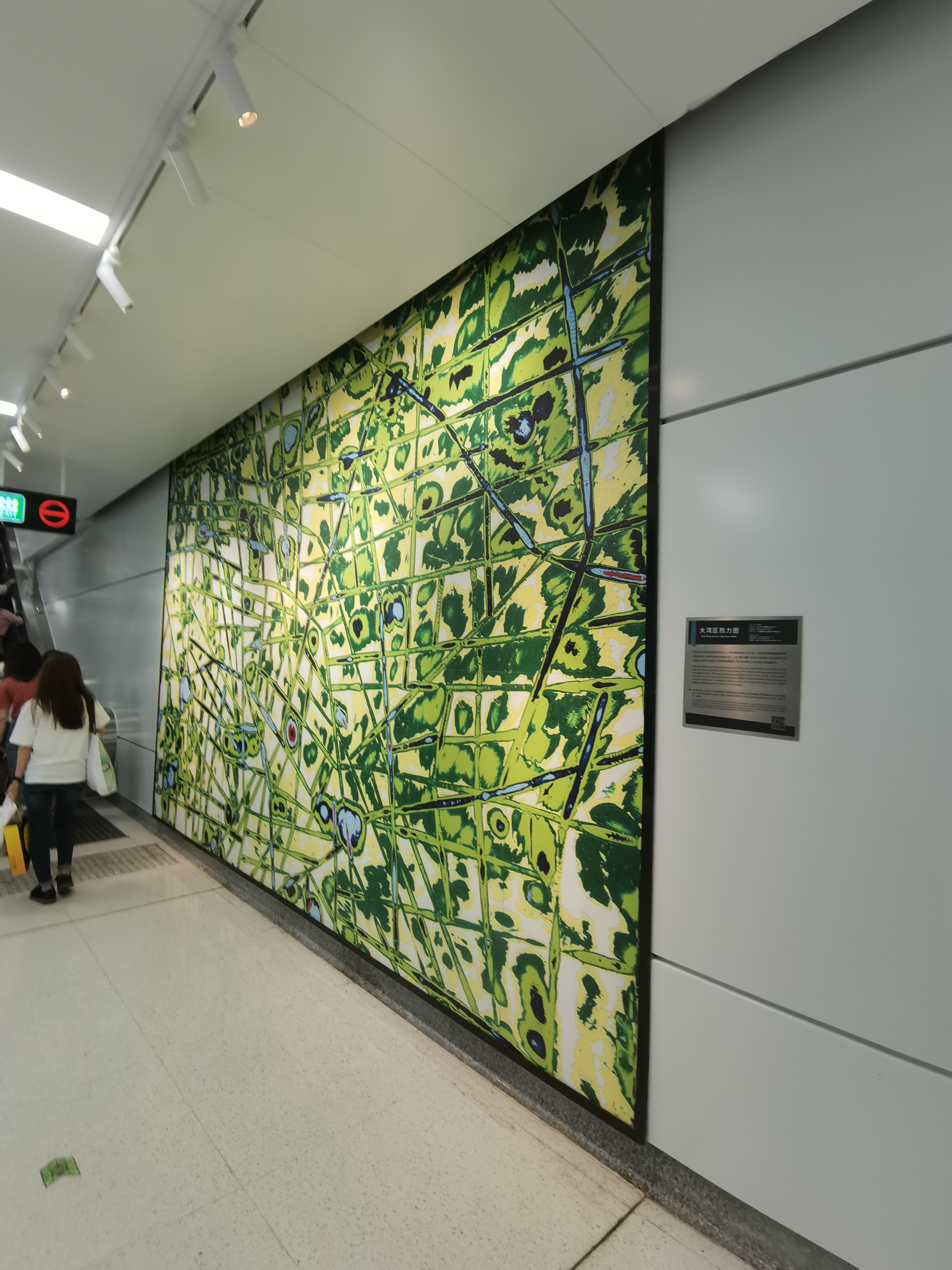
Line 6 platform culture wall 2

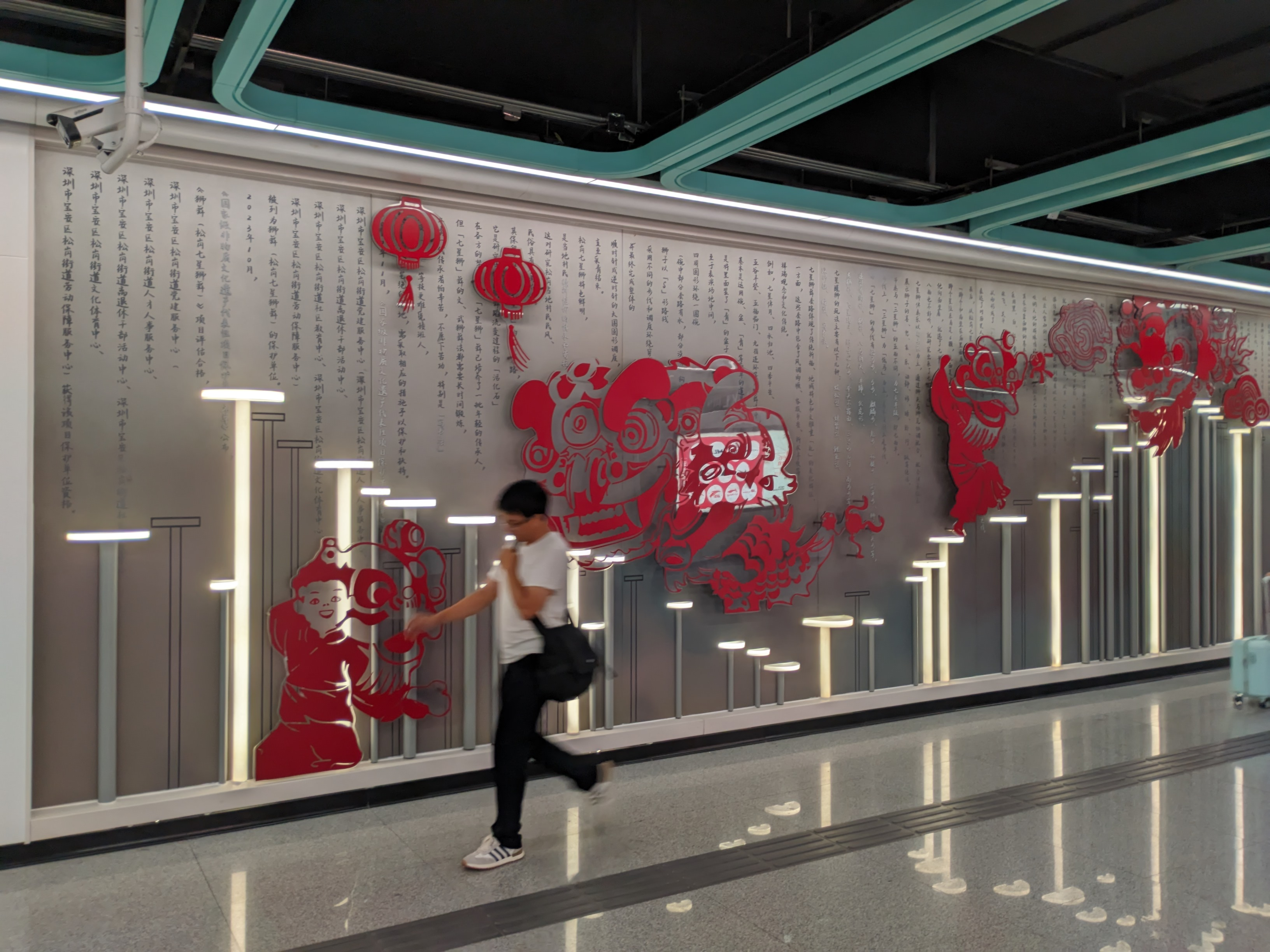
Line 12 transfer passage culture wall
