= Science Museum station =

Metro station in Shenzhen, Guangdong, China

Coordinates: 22°32′36″N 114°05′23″E

Science Museum 科学馆
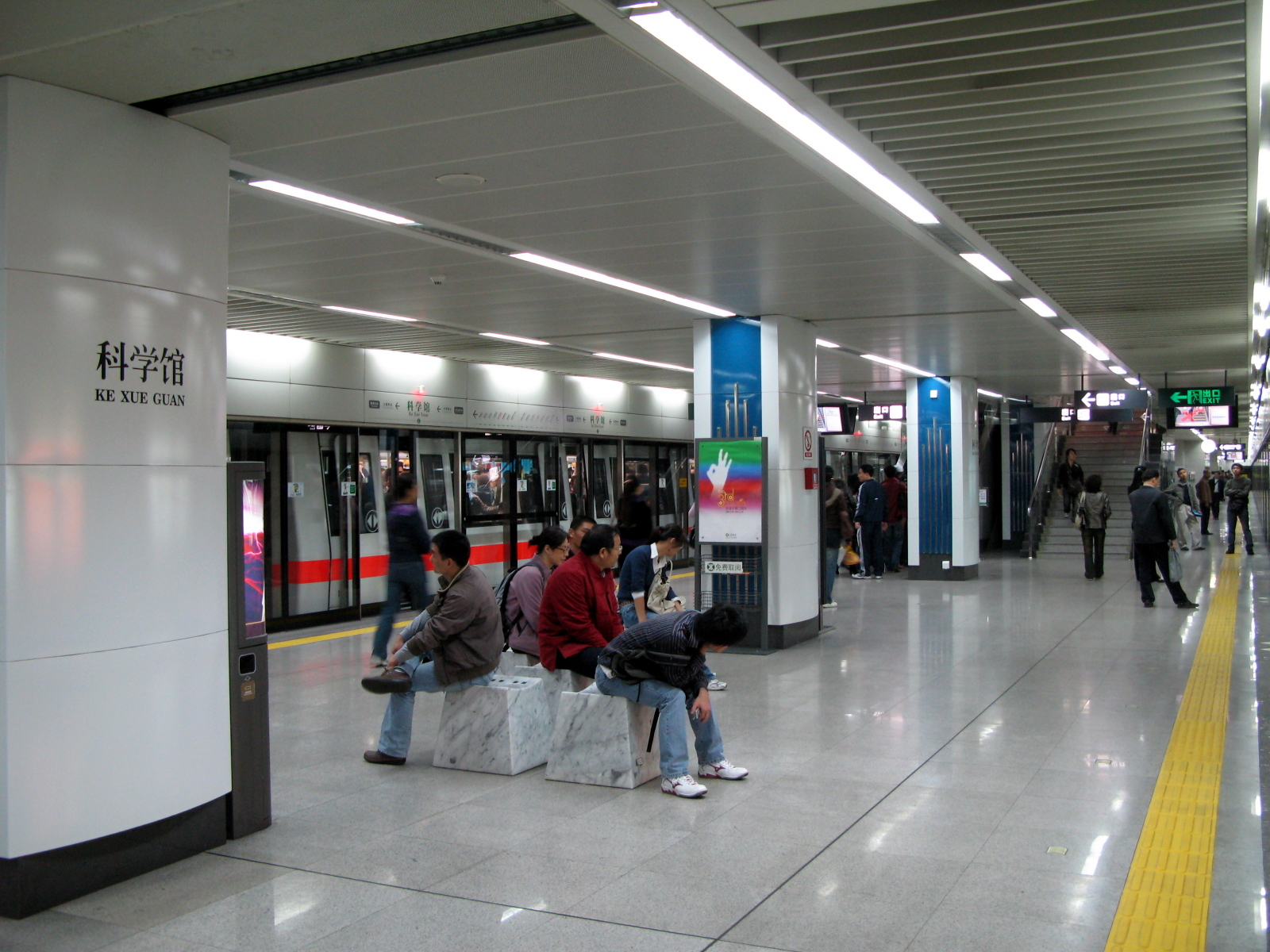
- Line 1 platform

Chinese name
- Traditional Chinese: 科學館
- Simplified Chinese: 科学馆
- Literal meaning: Science Museum
Transcriptions
Standard Mandarin
- Hanyu Pinyin: Kēxuē Guǎn
Yue: Cantonese
- Jyutping: Fo1hok6gun2

General information
- Location: Futian District, Shenzhen, Guangdong; China
- Operated by: SZMC (Shenzhen Metro Group)
- Lines: Line 1; Line 6
- Platforms: 4 (2 island platforms)
- Tracks: 4

Construction
- Structure type: Underground
- Platform levels: 2
- Accessible: Yes

Other information
- Station code: 126 (Line 1); 627 (Line 6)

History
- Opened: Line 1: 28 December 2004; 21 years ago Line 6: 18 August 2020; 5 years ago
- Previous names: Kexueguan

Services
Preceding station	Shenzhen Metro	Following station
Huaqiang Road towards Airport East	Line 1	Grand Theater towards Luohu
Tongxinling towards Songgang	Line 6	Terminus
Route map
Location

Science Museum station (simplified Chinese: 科学馆站; traditional Chinese: 科學館站; pinyin: Kēxuē Guǎn Zhàn; Cantonese Jyutping: Fo1 Hok6 Gun2 Zaam6), formerly Kexueguan station is a station of Line 1 and Line 6 of the Shenzhen Metro. Line 1 platforms opened on 28 December 2004 and Line 6 platforms opened on 18 August 2020. It is located underground at the junction of Shennan Zhonglu (深南中路), Shangbu Lu (上步路) and Congling Lu (松岭路; 松嶺路), in Futian District, Shenzhen, China. It takes its name from the Shenzhen Science Museum (深圳科学馆; 深圳科學館). It is near CITIC City Plaza (中信城市广场; 中信城市廣場).

== Station layout ==
G	-	Exit
B1F; Concourse	Lobby	Customer service, shops, vending machines, ATMs; Transfer passage between Line 1 and Line 6
B2F; Platforms	Platform 1	← Line 1 towards Airport East (Huaqiang Road)
B2F; Platforms	Island platform, doors will open on the left
B2F; Platforms	Platform 2	→ Line 1 towards Luohu (Grand Theater) →
B3F; Platforms	Platform	← Line 6 termination platform
B3F; Platforms	Island platform, doors will open on the left
B3F; Platforms	Platform	→ Line 6 towards Songgang (Tongxinling) →

== Exits ==
Exit	Destination
Exit A	Shennan Middle Road (N), Shangbu Middle Road, Shenzhen Municipal Committee of the CPC, Shenzhen Council House, Shenzhen Municipal Committee of the CPPCC in Guangdong, Shenzhen Municipal Federation of Trade Unions, Housing & Construction Bureau of Shenzhen Municipality (Municipal Housing & Construction Bureau), Government Second Office, Shenzhen Museum, Shenzhen Second People's Hospital, The Hospital of Integrative Chinese and Western Medicine, Shenzhen Retired Cadre's Entertainment Center, Statistics Bureau of Shenzhen Municipality (Municipal Statistics Bureau), China Guangdong Nuclear Power Holding, Shenzhen Family Planning Service Center, Shenzhen Maternity & Child Healthcare Hospital, First Outpatient Department of Shenzhen TCM Hospital, Shenzhen Lichee Park, Sichuan Building, Weipeng Garden, Science & Technology Building, Xinwen Building, Shenkan Building
Exit B	Shennan Boulevard (N), Yannan Road, Zhenxing Road, Housing & Construction Bureau of Shenzhen Municipality (Municipal Housing & Construction Bureau, Hualian Building, Shenzhen Book Center, China Securities, Sheji Building, Qiche Building, Dongfeng Building, Electronics & Technology Building
Exit C	Shennan Middle Road (S), Songling Road, Shangbu Middle School, China Post, Nanyuan Police Station, Jinbaocheng Building, Nanyuan Sub-district Office, Shaputou Industrial Building
Exit D	Shennan Middle Road (S), Shangbu South Road, Archives Building, JUSCO Citic City Plaza Store, Binhe Road, Dongyuan Road, Bading Street, Shangbu Primary School, Xincheng Building, Jinfeng Mansion, Taiwan Garden, Shangtian Building, Guoqi Building, Wande Building
Exit E	South Side of Shennan Middle Rd (W), West Side of Shangbu South Rd, North Side of Nanyuan Rd (W)
Exit F	North Side of Nanyuan Rd (E), East Side of Shangbu South Rd, South Side of Shennan Middle Rd
