= Minle station (Shenzhen Metro) =

Metro station in Shenzhen, China

Coordinates: 22°35′38″N 114°2′56″E

Minle 民乐
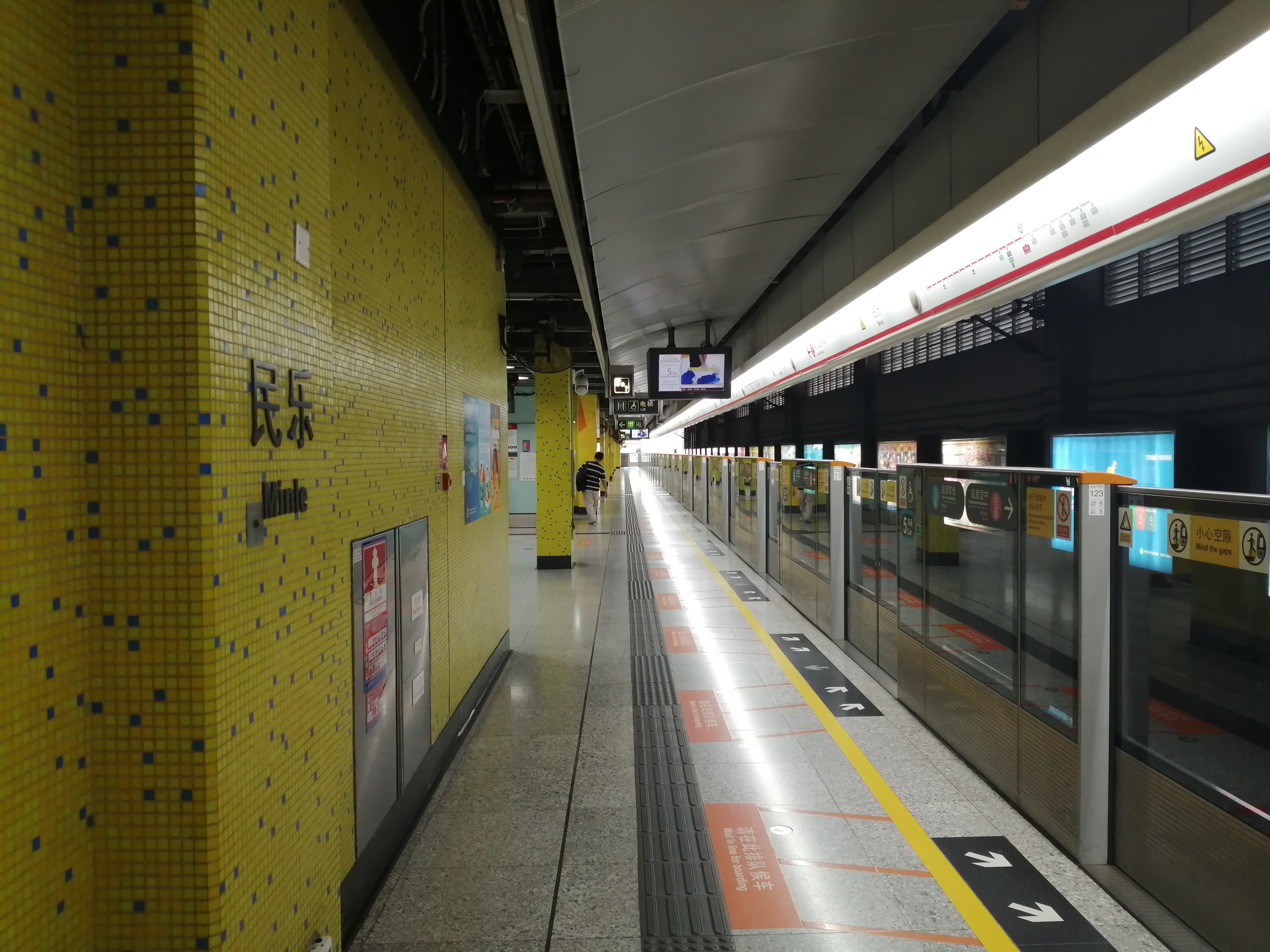

General information
- Location: Longhua District, Shenzhen, Guangdong; China
- Operator: MTR Corporation (Shenzhen)
- Line: Line 4
- Platforms: 2 (1 island platform)
- Tracks: 2

Construction
- Structure type: Partially Underground
- Accessible: Yes

History
- Opened: 16 June 2011

Services
Preceding station	Shenzhen Metro	Following station
Baishilong towards Niuhu	Line 4	Shangmeilin towards Futian Checkpoint
Out-of-station interchange
Shenzhen North towards Songgang	Line 6 transfer at Meilinguan	Hanling towards Science Museum
Location

Minle station
- Simplified Chinese: 民乐站
- Traditional Chinese: 民樂站
Transcriptions
Standard Mandarin
- Hanyu Pinyin: Mínlè Zhàn
Yue: Cantonese
- Jyutping: man4 lok6 zaam6

Minle station (Chinese: 民乐站; pinyin: Mínlè Zhàn) is a station on Line 4 of the Shenzhen Metro. It opened on 16 June 2011.

== Station layout ==
2F; Concourse	Lobby	Customer Service, Shops, Vending machines, ATMs
1F; Platforms	Platform 2	Line 4 towards Futian Checkpoint (Shangmeilin)
1F; Platforms	Island platform, doors will open on the left
1F; Platforms	Platform 1	→ Line 4 towards Niuhu (Baishilong)
G	-	Exit

== Exits ==
Exit	Destination
Exit A	Homestead of Scholars, Shopping Town
Exit B	Homestead of Scholars
Exit C	Minle Village, Fengze Lake Heights, Galaxy Dante, Minle Metro Station Bus Stop
