= Meilinguan station =

Metro station in Shenzhen, China

Meilinguan 梅林关
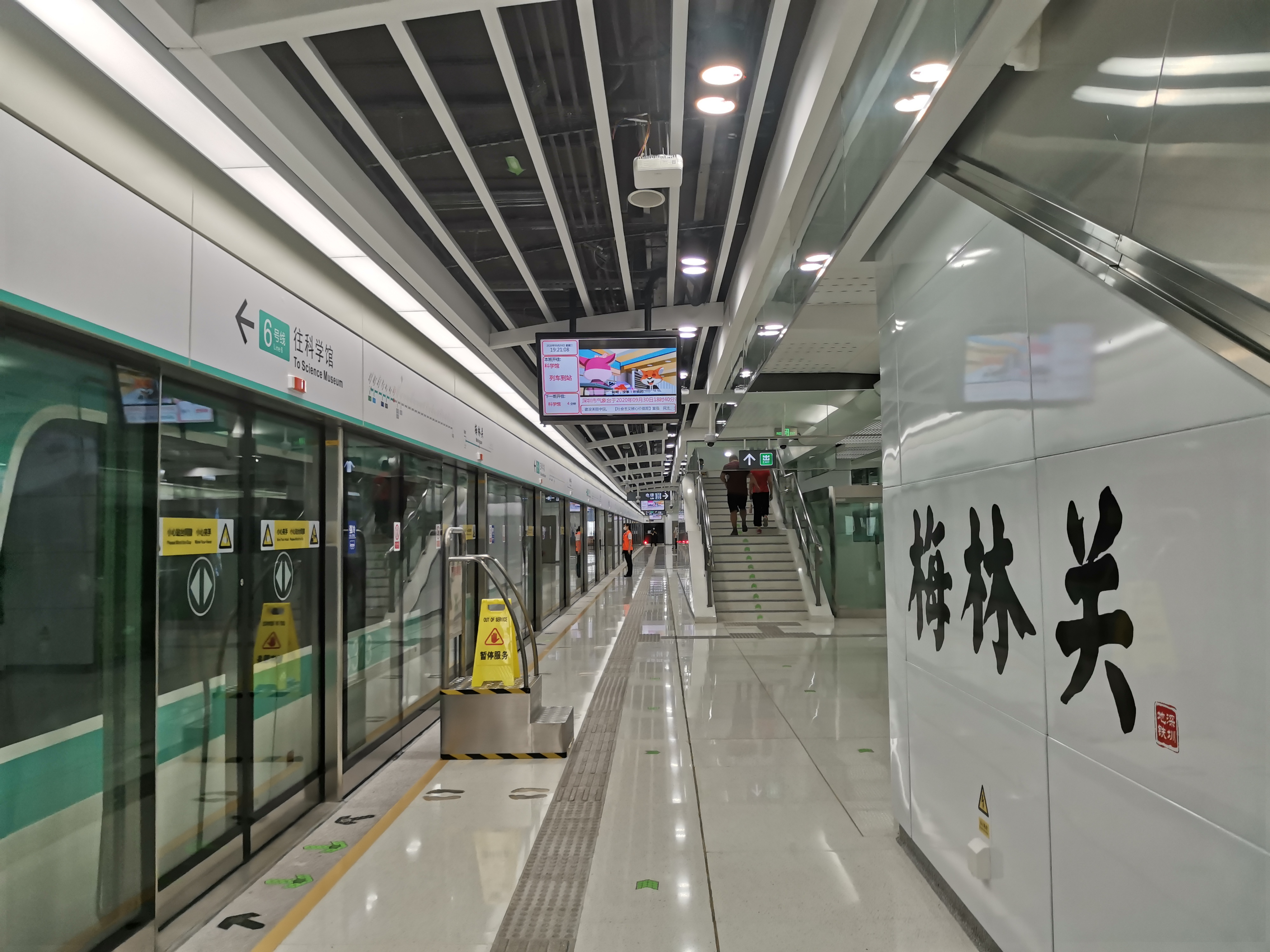
- Platform

General information
- Location: Longhua District, Shenzhen, Guangdong; China
- Coordinates: 22.595157°N 114.049485°E
- Operated by: SZMC (Shenzhen Metro Group)
- Line: Line 6
- Platforms: 2 (1 island platform)
- Tracks: 2

Construction
- Structure type: Underground
- Accessible: Yes

History
- Opened: 18 August 2020

Services
| Preceding station | Shenzhen Metro | Following station |
|---|---|---|
| Shenzhen North towards Songgang | Line 6 | Hanling towards Science Museum |
Out-of-station interchange
| Baishilong towards Niuhu | Line 4 transfer at Minle | Shangmeilin towards Futian Checkpoint |
Location

Meilinguan station (Chinese: 梅林关站; pinyin: Méilínguān Zhàn) is a station on Line 6 of the Shenzhen Metro which opened on 18 August 2020.

== Station layout ==
| G | - | Exit |
| B1F; Concourse | Lobby | Customer Service, Shops, Vending machines, ATMs |
| B2F; Platforms | Platform | ← Line 6 towards Science Museum (Hanling) |
| B2F; Platforms | Island platform, doors will open on the left |
| B2F; Platforms | Platform | → Line 6 towards Songgang (Shenzhen North) → |

== Exits ==
| Exit | Destination |
|---|---|
| Exit A | Meiguan Road (S), Meilin Customs |
| Exit B | Meiguan Road (N), Minle Village, Fengze Lake Villa, Dandi Experimental School, Minle Primary School |
