= Vienna Hotels =

Hotel chain based in Shenzhen, China

Vienna Hotel Group Limited
- Native name

Chinese name
- Traditional Chinese: 維也納酒店有限公司
- Simplified Chinese: 维也纳酒店有限公司
Transcriptions
Standard Mandarin
- Hanyu Pinyin: Wéiyěnà Jiǔdiàn Yǒuxiàngōngsī
Yue: Cantonese
- Jyutping: wai4 jaa5 naap6 zau2 dim3 jau5 haan6 gung1 si1
- Founded: 1993; 33 years ago in Shenzhen
- Founder: Huang Deman (chairperson)
- Headquarters: Shenzhen North Railway Station, Bao'an District, Shenzhen, China
- Key people: Wu Wei (president and CEO)

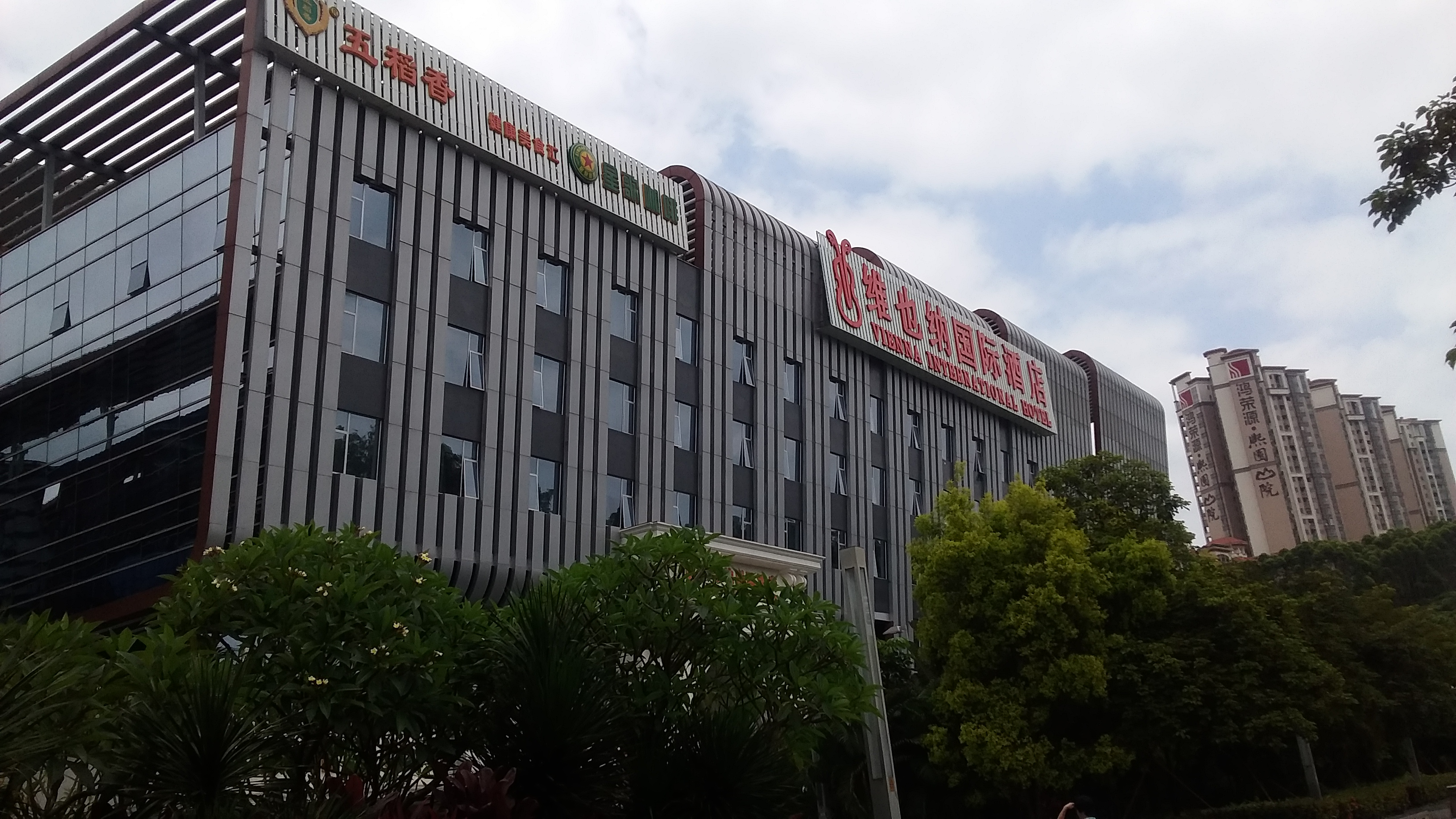
Vienna International Hotel at Shenzhen North Station, the corporate headquarters of the chain

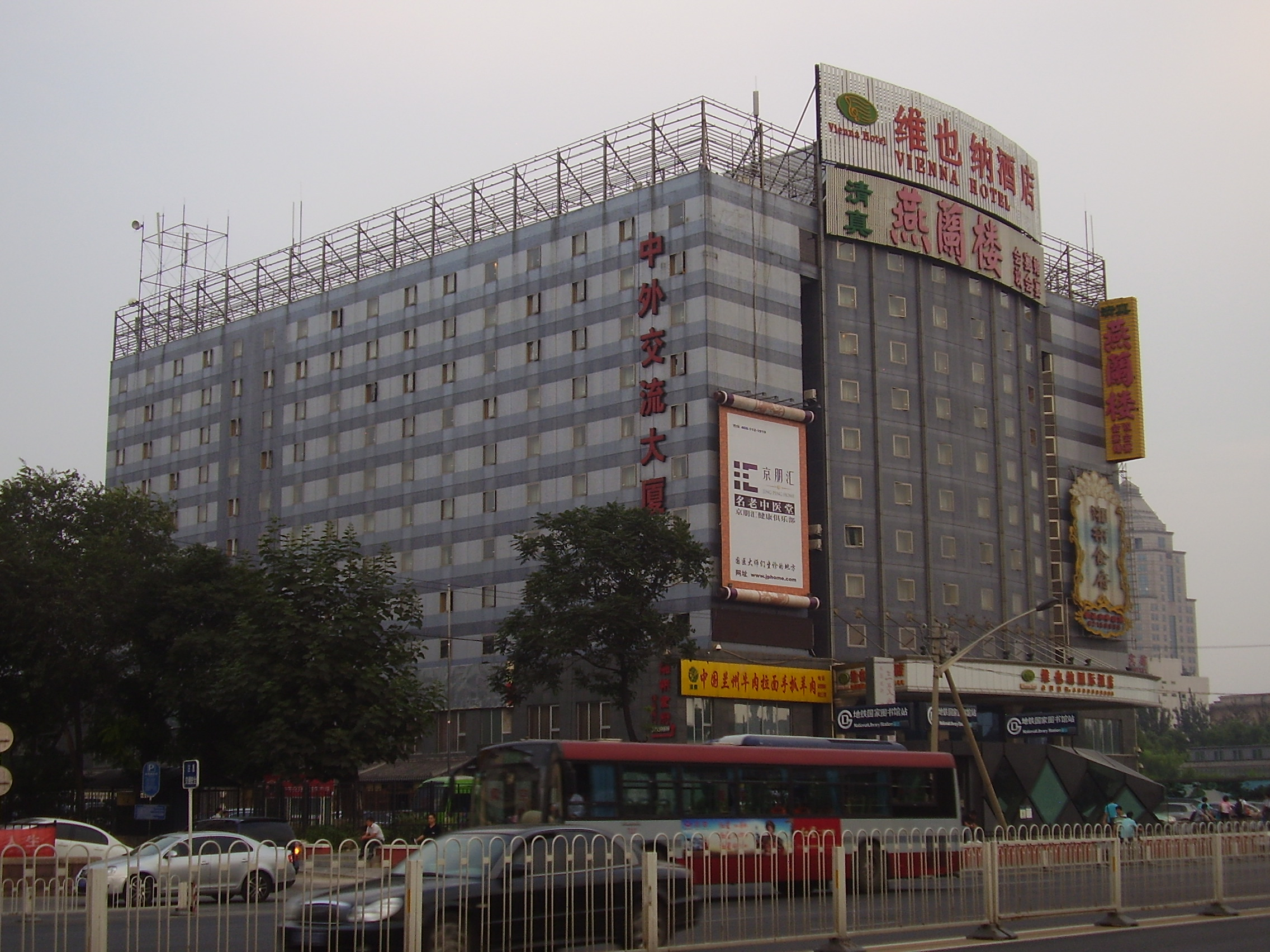
Vienna Hotel Beijing Shouti Hotel in the Zhongwai Jiaolu Building in Haidian District, Beijing

Vienna Hotel Group Limited, operating as Vienna Hotels (simplified Chinese: 维也纳精品连锁酒店; traditional Chinese: 維也納精品連鎖酒店; pinyin: Wéiyěnà Jīngpǐn Liánsuǒ Jiǔdiàn, "Vienna Quality Chain Hotels," referring to Vienna, Austria) is a hotel chain in China, headquartered in Shenzhen North Railway Station, Bao'an District, Shenzhen.

As of 2012 the chain, which is considered mid-range, has 150 hotels with 20,000 rooms. Huang Deman (Note: 黄德满; Huáng Démǎn) is the founder and chairperson, and Wu Wei is the president and CEO. The English slogan is "High-quality Experience Low-cost payment". The Chinese slogan is "五星体验 二星消费" (wǔxīng tǐyàn èrxīng xiāofèi).

The company operates the brands Vienna Hotel (Note: 维也纳酒店; Wéiyěnà Jiǔdiàn), 3 Best Inn (Note: 3好酒店; 3hǎo Jiǔdiàn), Venus Hotel (Note: 维纳斯酒店; Wéinàsī Jiǔdiàn) and Vienna International Hotel. (Note: 维也纳国际酒店; Wéiyěnà Guójì Jiǔdiàn) Previously two of the brands were named Venus Crown Hotel and Venus International Hotel.

Huang established the company in Shenzhen in 1993. It was the first Chinese hotel chain to have an "art and music" (Note: 音乐艺术; Yīnyuè Yìshù) theme. At one time Huang wanted to make a budget hotel chain, since around 2007 budget hotel chains were prospering, but after five years of operations he chose to make Vienna Hotel a mid-range chain. In 2011, the China Hotel Starlight Awards Lifetime Achievement Award (Note: 中国酒店业星光奖终身成就奖; Zhōngguó Jiǔdiànyè Xīngguāng Jiǎng Zhōngshēn Chéngjiù Jiǎng) was awarded to Huang.

== Corporate affairs ==
The company is headquartered in the Vienna International Hotel by the Shenzhen North Railway Station in Longhua District (formerly a part of Bao'an District), Shenzhen. The chain previously had its headquarters in Lüjing Garden (Note: 绿景花园; 綠景花園; Lǜjǐng Huāyuán; luk6 ging2 faa1 jyun4*2), Futian District, Shenzhen.
