= Hanling station =

Metro station in Shenzhen, China

Hanling 翰岭
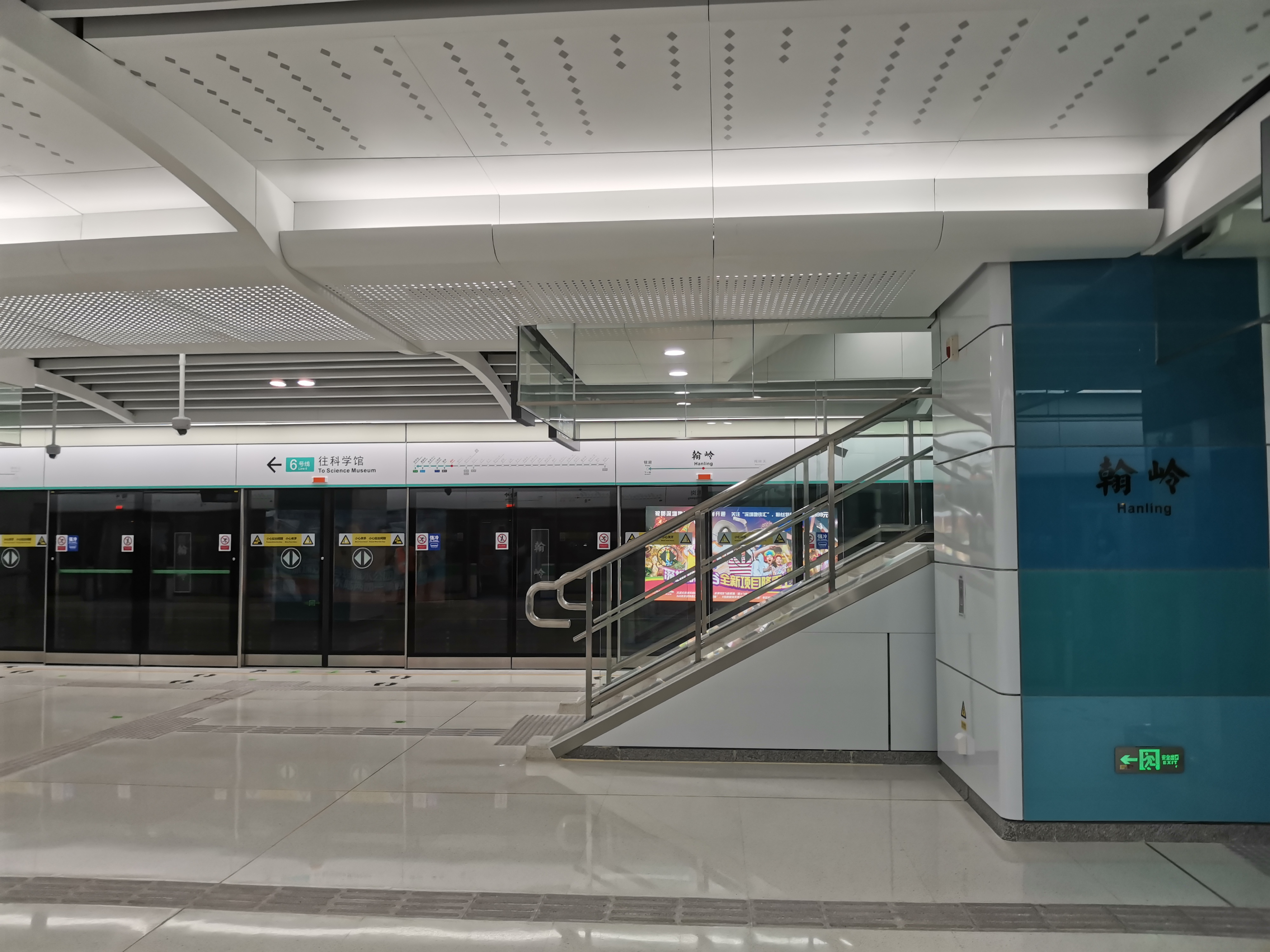
- Platform

General information
- Location: Futian District, Shenzhen, Guangdong; China
- Coordinates: 22.576932°N 114.063810°E
- Operated by: SZMC (Shenzhen Metro Group)
- Line: Line 6
- Platforms: 2 (1 island platform)
- Tracks: 2

Construction
- Structure type: Underground
- Accessible: Yes

History
- Opened: 18 August 2020

Services
Preceding station	Shenzhen Metro	Following station
Meilinguan towards Songgang	Line 6	Yinhu towards Science Museum
Location

Hanling station (Chinese: 翰岭站; pinyin: Hànlǐng Zhàn) is a station on Line 6 of the Shenzhen Metro. It opened on 18 August 2020.

== Station layout ==
G	-	Exit
B1F; Concourse	Lobby	Customer Service, Shops, Vending machines, ATMs
B2F; Platforms	Platform	← Line 6 towards Science Museum (Yinhu)
B2F; Platforms	Island platform, doors will open on the left
B2F; Platforms	Platform	→ Line 6 towards Songgang (Meilinguan) →

== Exits ==
Exit	Destination
Exit A1, A2	Hanling Courtyard, Mid Mountain View
Exit B	Hanling Experimental School, Futian Detention Center, Futian District Squadron, Shenzhen Detachment of the armed police force

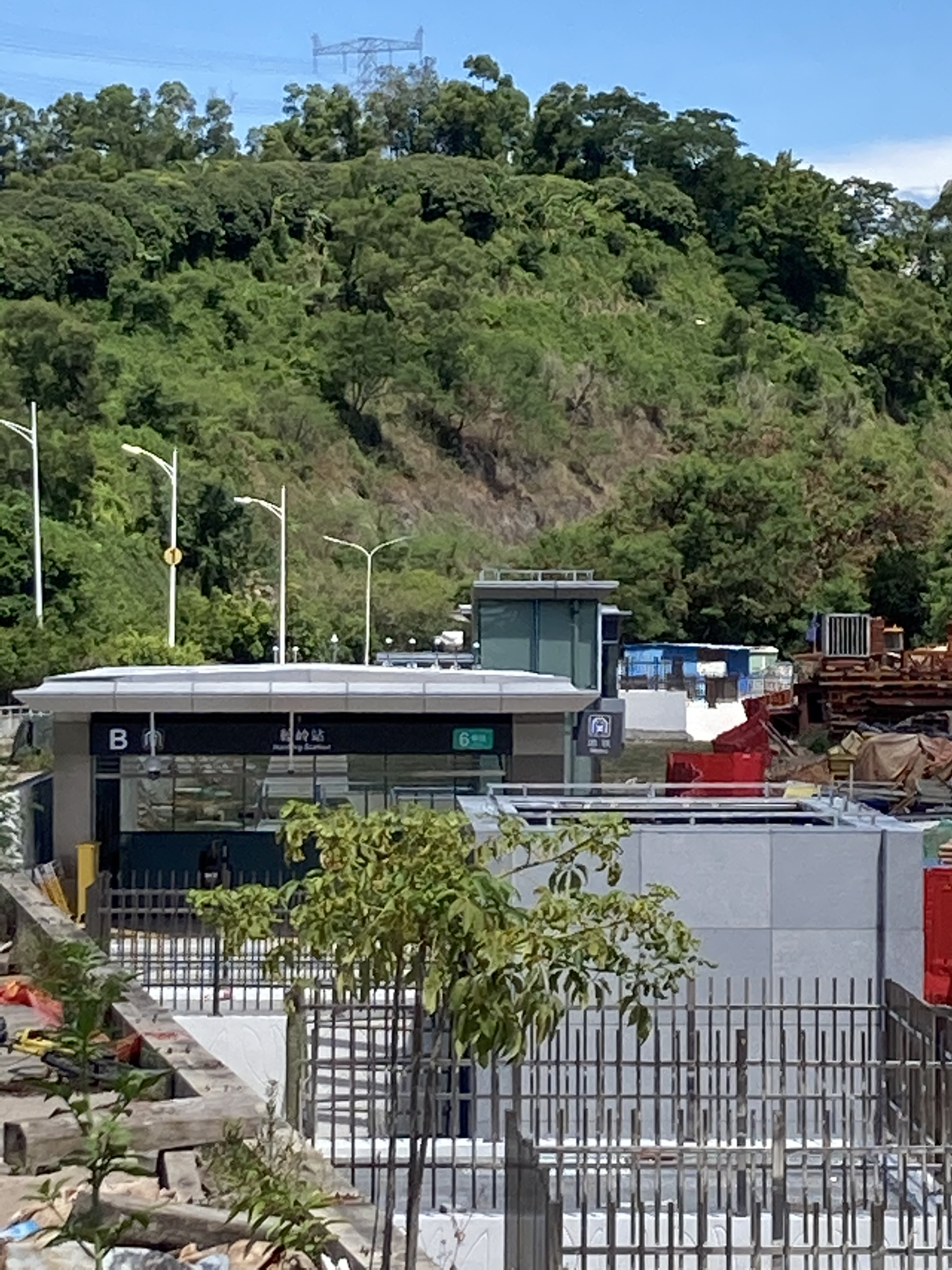
Exit B
