= Baishilong station =

Metro station in Shenzhen, Guangdong, China

Coordinates: 22°36′5″N 114°2′33″E

Baishilong 白石龙
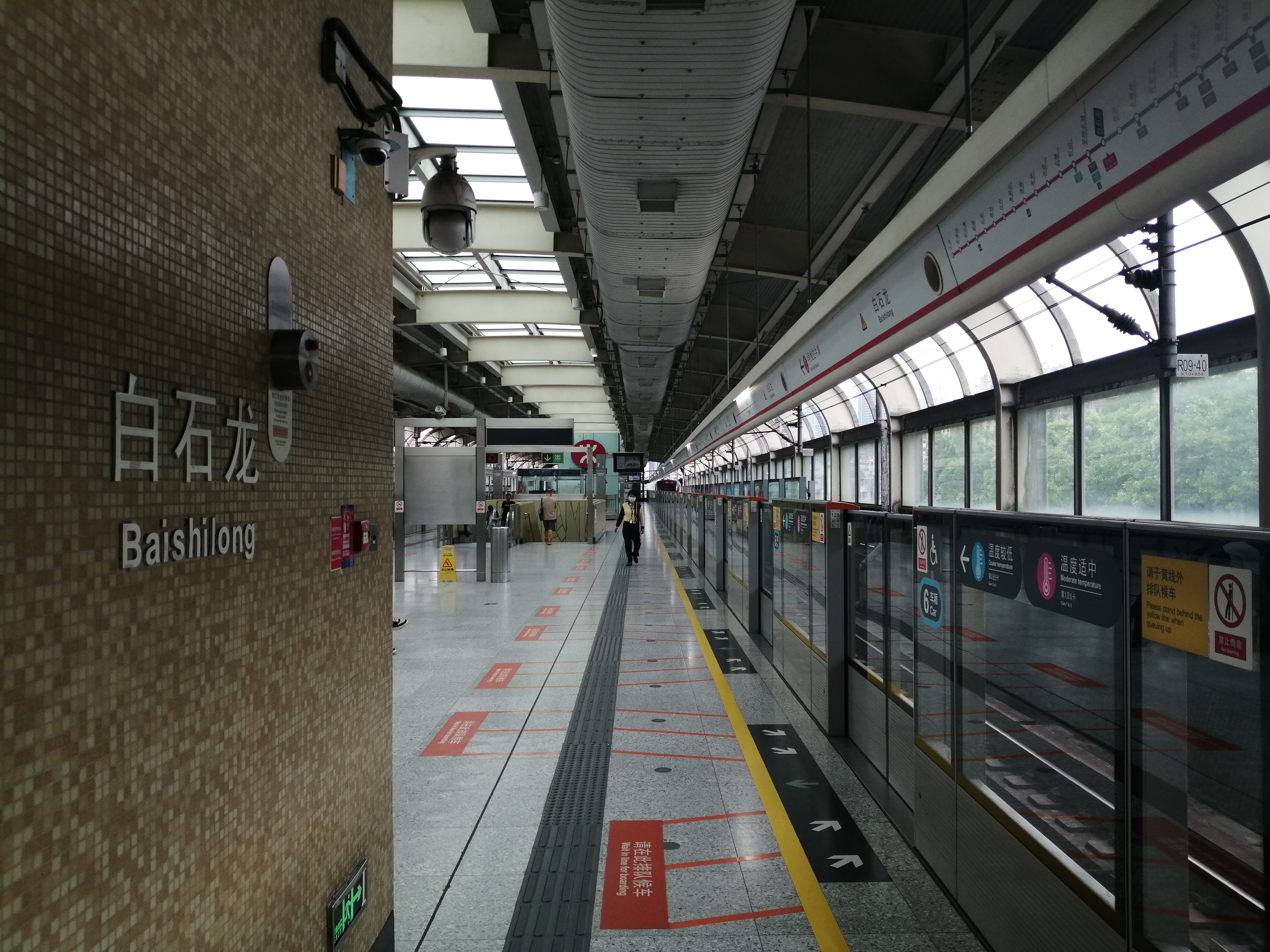

General information
- Location: Longhua District, Shenzhen, Guangdong; China
- Operator: MTR Corporation (Shenzhen)
- Line: Line 4
- Platforms: 2 (1 island platform)
- Tracks: 2

Construction
- Structure type: Elevated
- Accessible: Yes

History
- Opened: 16 June 2011

Services
| Preceding station | Shenzhen Metro | Following station |
|---|---|---|
| Shenzhen North towards Niuhu | Line 4 | Minle towards Futian Checkpoint |
Location

Baishilong station (simplified Chinese: 白石龙站; traditional Chinese: 白石龍站; pinyin: Báishílóng Zhàn; Jyutping: baak6 sek6 lung4 zaam6) is a station on Line 4 of the Shenzhen Metro. It opened on 16 June 2011.

== Station layout ==
| 3F; Platforms | Platform 2 | ← Line 4 towards Futian Checkpoint (Minle) |
| 3F; Platforms | Island platform, doors will open on the left |
| 3F; Platforms | Platform 1 | → Line 4 towards Niuhu (Shenzhen North) → |
| 2F; Concourse | Lobby | Customer Service, Shops, Vending machines, ATMs |
| G | - | Exit |

== Exits ==
| Exit | Destination |
|---|---|
| Exit A | Huilongyuan, Vienna Hotel, 3 Best Inn, Shilong Road Bus Stop, Baishilong Terminal, Baishilingcun Crossing Bus Stop, Baishiling Village |
| Exit B | Yangguang Xinyuan |
| Exit C | Harmony Villa |
| Exit D | Xinhai Apartment, Huixin Apartment, Minle Aomen Xincun, Huixin Apartment ① Bus Stop, Huixin Apartment ② Bus Stop |
