= Shenzhen North railway station =

Railway and metro interchange station in Shenzhen, Guangdong, China

Shenzhen North 深圳北站
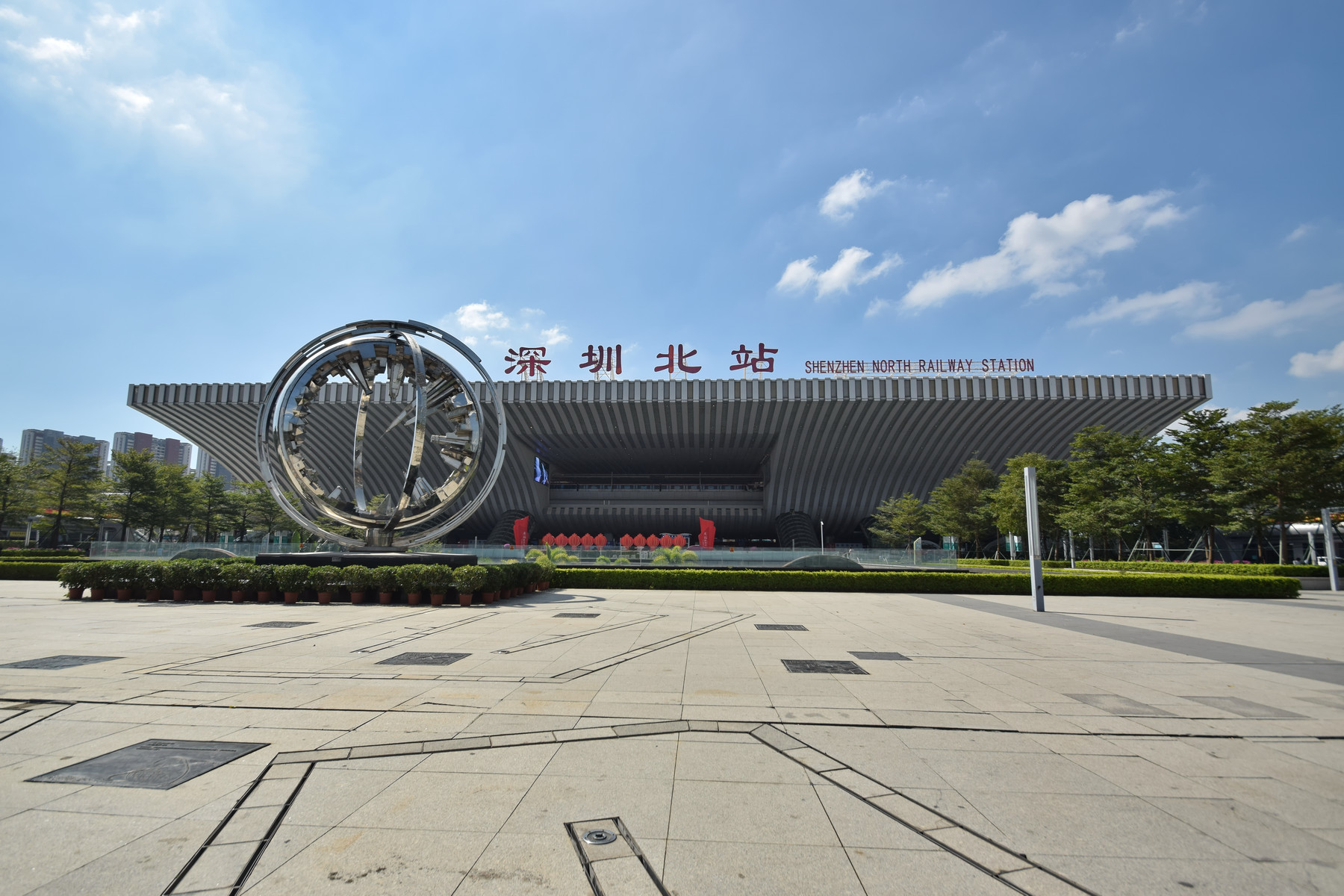

General information
- Other names: Shenzhenbei; Shenzhen Xin; New Shenzhen; Longhua
- Location: 28 Zhiyuan Middle Road, Minzhi Road, Longhua District, Shenzhen, Guangdong; China
- Coordinates: 22°36′43″N 114°1′26″E
- Operator: CR Guangzhou; SZMC (Shenzhen Metro Group); MTR Corporation (Shenzhen)
- Lines: Guangzhou–Shenzhen–Hong Kong Express Rail Link; Hangzhou–Fuzhou–Shenzhen railway; Ganzhou–Shenzhen high-speed railway; Shenzhen–Zhanjiang high-speed railway (planned); Line 4; Line 5; Line 6
- Platforms: CRH: 20 (9 island platforms, 2 side platforms) Shenzhen Metro: 6 (2 island platforms, 2 side platforms)
- Tracks: CRH: 20; Shenzhen Metro: 6
- Connections: Shenzhen Metro Lines 4, 5 and 6; Shenzhen North Coach Station

Construction
- Structure type: CRH: At-grade; Shenzhen Metro: Elevated (Lines 4 & 6); Underground (Line 5)
- Accessible: Yes

Other information
- Station code: TMIS code: 65860; Telegraph code: IOQ; Pinyin code: SZB
- Classification: Top Class station

History
- Opened: 22 June 2011; 15 years ago (Lines 4 & 5); 18 August 2020; 6 years ago (Line 6)
- Former names: New Shenzhen (Shenzhen Xin)

Key dates
- CRH opened: 26 December 2011

Passengers
- CRH: 126 million (2025, CRH arrivals and departures)
Track layout
Location

Shenzhen North Railway Station (Chinese: 深圳北站; pinyin: Shēnzhèn Běi Zhàn; Jyutping: sam^{1} zan^{3} bak^{1} zaam^{6}), also known as Shenzhenbei Railway Station, is a major China Railway High-speed station in Longhua District, Shenzhen, Guangdong, China. It is served by the Guangzhou–Shenzhen–Hong Kong Express Rail Link, the Hangzhou–Fuzhou–Shenzhen railway, the Ganzhou–Shenzhen high-speed railway and Shenzhen Metro Lines 4, 5 and 6. The national-rail station has 11 platforms and 20 tracks, while the adjoining metro station has elevated platforms for Lines 4 and 6 and underground platforms for Line 5.

The station was planned under the names New Shenzhen station, Shenzhen New Passenger Station and Longhua station before receiving its present name in 2008. The metro interchange opened on 22 June 2011, followed by the high-speed rail station on 26 December 2011 and the Line 6 metro platforms on 18 August 2020. By 2025 Shenzhen North recorded 126 million annual passenger arrivals and departures, ranking third among railway stations in China, and China Railway implemented a July 2026 timetable under which the station was scheduled for 848 EMU train movements a day.

Shenzhen North is built as an integrated transport hub. It connects the high-speed rail concourse and platforms with Shenzhen Metro, local buses, taxis, private-vehicle parking and a long-distance coach station without a traditional freestanding station square. The station also has in-station transfer passages in the north and south exit corridors, allowing passengers who already hold onward train tickets to return directly to the waiting hall instead of leaving and re-entering the station.

== History ==
=== Planning and design ===
After the establishment of the Shenzhen Special Economic Zone in 1980, Shenzhen railway station was the city's principal railway passenger terminal. Its constrained site near the city centre and the boundary with Hong Kong made large-scale expansion difficult, and by the late 1990s Shenzhen began planning a second passenger railway station. Before the new terminal was completed, many long-distance trains were shifted to Shenzhen West railway station.

In November 2003, the Shenzhen Municipal Government completed the Transport Plan for Shenzhen's Second Railway Passenger Station. The plan proposed routing the Beijing-Guangzhou passenger dedicated line and the Guangzhou-Shenzhen-Hong Kong line together through the Guangzhou-Shenzhen section, forming what was then described as the Beijing-Guangzhou-Shenzhen-Hong Kong passenger dedicated line, and placed the interchange with the Xiamen-Shenzhen Railway in the Longhua expansion area. In 2005 Shenzhen and the Ministry of Railways completed broader railway-hub plans and reached agreement on the station site and the alignment of the Guangzhou-Shenzhen-Hong Kong line within Shenzhen.

Between July and October 2005, the municipal government and the Ministry of Railways held an international consultation for the station's integrated hub plan. Four foreign design firms and three domestic railway survey and design institutes formed four design teams and submitted preliminary schemes. The two sides signed a memorandum on station arrangements in August 2006. A hub feasibility study began in June 2007, and the railway station building's preliminary design was completed in November of that year. Coordination took longer because Shenzhen and the railway ministry differed on how the railway station should connect with urban transport; the final scheme was settled in 2008.

=== Renaming ===
During planning and design, the project appeared under several names, including New Shenzhen Station, Shenzhen New Passenger Station and Longhua Railway Station. On 23 December 2008, the Shenzhen Municipal Planning Bureau announced that the new station would be named Shenzhen North. The freight and marshalling station on the Guangzhou-Shenzhen Railway that had previously used the Shenzhen North name reverted to its earlier name, Sungang station.

=== Metro station opening ===
The second phase of Shenzhen Metro Line 4 opened on 16 June 2011, but the Line 4 platforms at Shenzhen North remained closed because Line 5 had not yet opened. Most Line 4 trains passed through without stopping, and the few trains that stopped did not open their doors. The metro station formally opened on 22 June 2011 with the opening of Line 5. For about half a year before high-speed rail service began, the hub functioned only as a metro interchange and bus-transfer point while the national-rail station remained under construction.

=== High-speed rail opening ===
The opening of the high-speed rail station was postponed several times: from before the November 2010 Guangzhou Asian Games to 28 December 2010, then to 8 August 2011, and finally to 26 December 2011. The delays followed broader reassessment of high-speed rail construction in China after the 2011 Wenzhou train collision, although trial running on the Guangzhou-Shenzhen-Hong Kong line continued for several months.

The opening ceremony for the Guangzhou-Shenzhen section of the Guangzhou-Shenzhen-Hong Kong Express Rail Link and for Shenzhen North station was held on the morning of 26 December 2011. Minister of Railways Sheng Guangzu, Guangdong party secretary Wang Yang, former Guangdong governor Huang Huahua and acting governor Zhu Xiaodan attended. The first train, G6126, left Shenzhen North at 10:40 and arrived at Guangzhou South 28 minutes later.

At opening, Shenzhen North served only trains to Guangzhou South. Passengers continuing to stations on the Wuhan-Guangzhou high-speed line had to buy separate tickets and transfer at Guangzhou South. On 1 April 2012, through services between the Guangzhou-Shenzhen-Hong Kong and Wuhan-Guangzhou lines began, adding 20 pairs of trains from Shenzhen North to Wuhan and Changsha South and ending the earlier transfer-card arrangement at Guangzhou South.

Later timetable changes added services to more parts of China. The Xiamen–Shenzhen railway opened on 28 December 2013, extending high-speed and EMU services eastward along the coast. In December 2020, a capacity project added six entry and exit tracks at the station.

== Station structure ==
Shenzhen North is in southeastern Longhua District, about 9.3 km (5.8 mi) from central Shenzhen. The site lies near the city's geographic and population centre, in the former Longhua second-line expansion area, and was selected for its development potential.

The hub is divided into the high-speed rail station building, East Square and West Square. It occupies about 650,000 m^{2} (7,000,000 sq ft) of land and has about 400,000 m^{2} (4,300,000 sq ft) of floor area. The high-speed railway runs north–south with the station building above the tracks. East Square is organized mainly around public transport, while West Square focuses on private cars and long-distance coaches. The main pedestrian traffic level is a platform at an elevation of 90 m (300 ft), which ties together the national-rail station, the two squares and surrounding development.

Line 4 and Line 6 of the Shenzhen Metro pass through East Square on an elevated alignment broadly parallel with the high-speed rail tracks and under the station's large roof. Line 5 and the Pingnan Railway cross the hub from east to west below the national-rail station; the Pingnan Railway has no platforms there. Taxis and buses use dedicated access roads within the hub, while coaches connect to nearby expressways, reducing conflicts with surrounding urban traffic.

=== Site layout ===
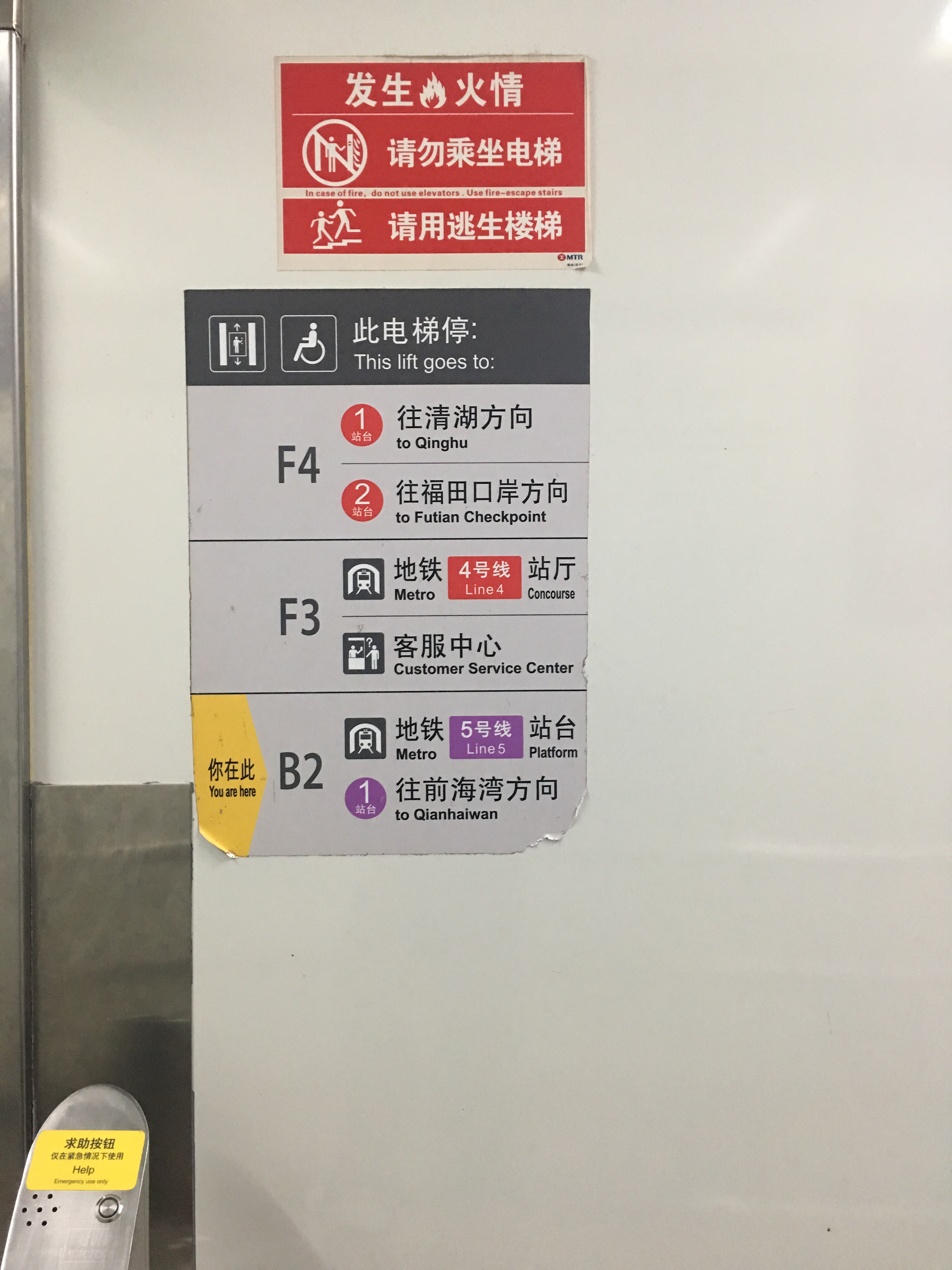
The floor prompt poster of the lift on the B2 floor in the Shenzhen North station of the Shenzhen Metro

Elevation	West Square Plaza	High speed rail station	East Square Plaza
106m			Line 4, Shenzhen Metro platforms		F4
100m		Commercial area	Line 4 and Line 6, Shenzhen Metro concourse Customer service center		F3
90m		High speed rail	East Square platform	Local bus (arrival)	F2
90m	Coach station	Waiting room, ticket office	East Square platform	Taxi (Arrival)	F2
84m	Taxi parking	High speed rail platforms	Transfer hall	Local bus (departure)	F1
84m	Private vehicle parking	High speed rail platforms	Transfer hall	Taxi (departure)	F1
78m	Private vehicle parking	High speed rail arrivals hall	Transfer hall	Local bus (departure)	B1
78m	Private vehicle parking	High speed rail arrivals hall	Transfer hall	Taxi (departure)	B1
78m	Private vehicle parking	High speed rail arrivals hall	Transfer hall	Private vehicle parking	B1
68m		Pinghu–Nanshan railway – no platform access		Line 5, Shenzhen Metro platforms	B2
62.5m		Xinqu Blvd

=== Station building ===
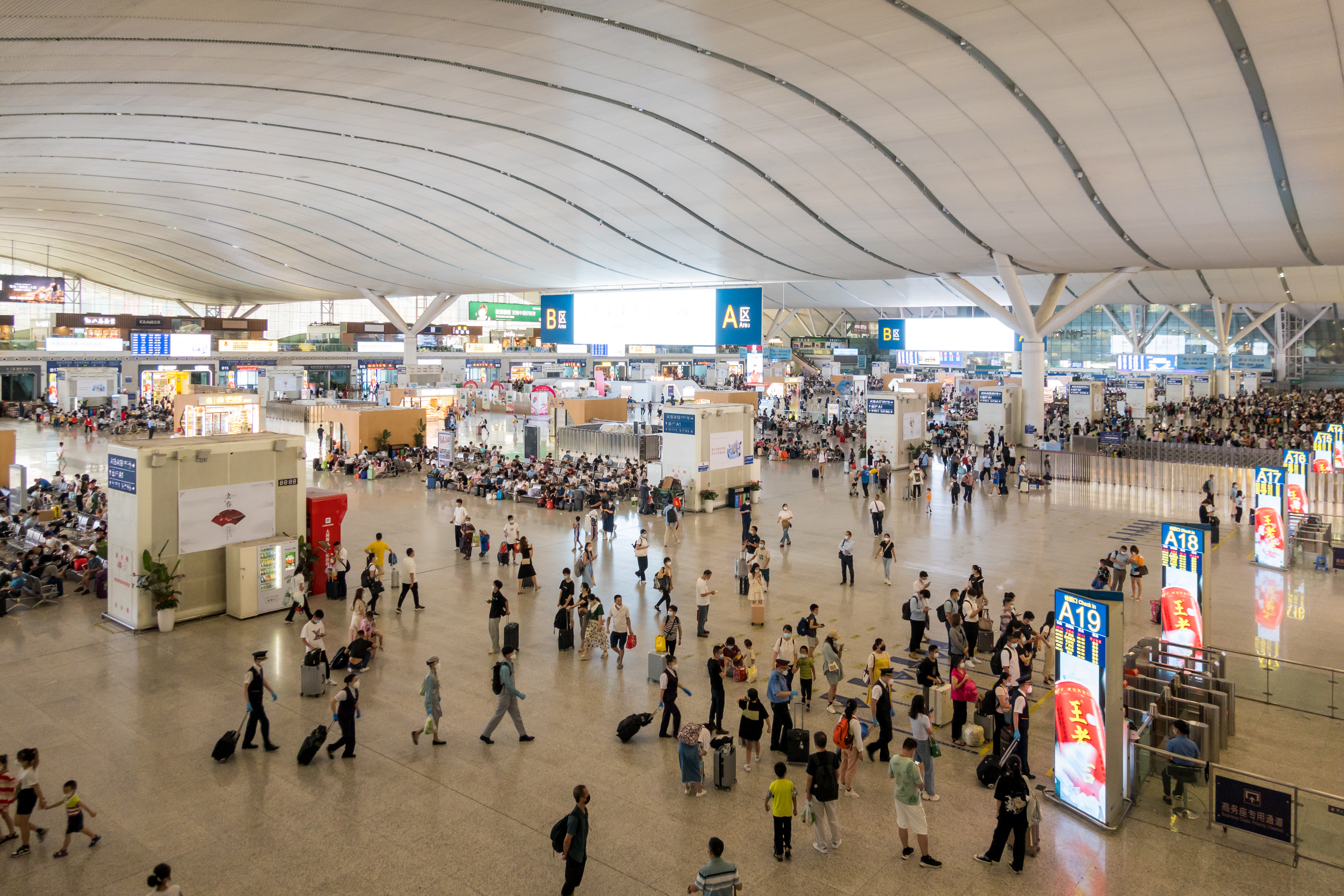
Waiting hall in 2022

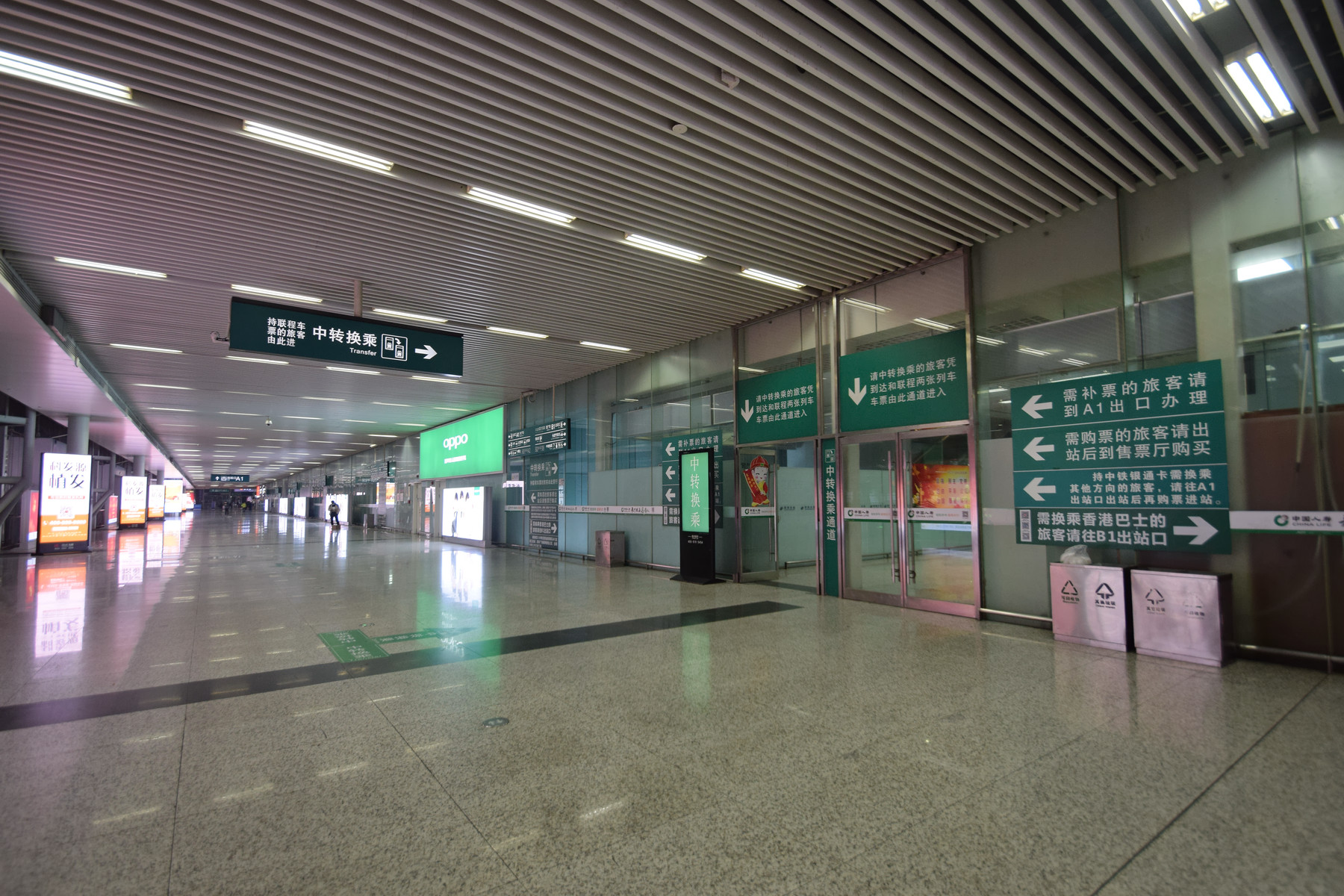
Transfer corridor for passengers holding onward tickets

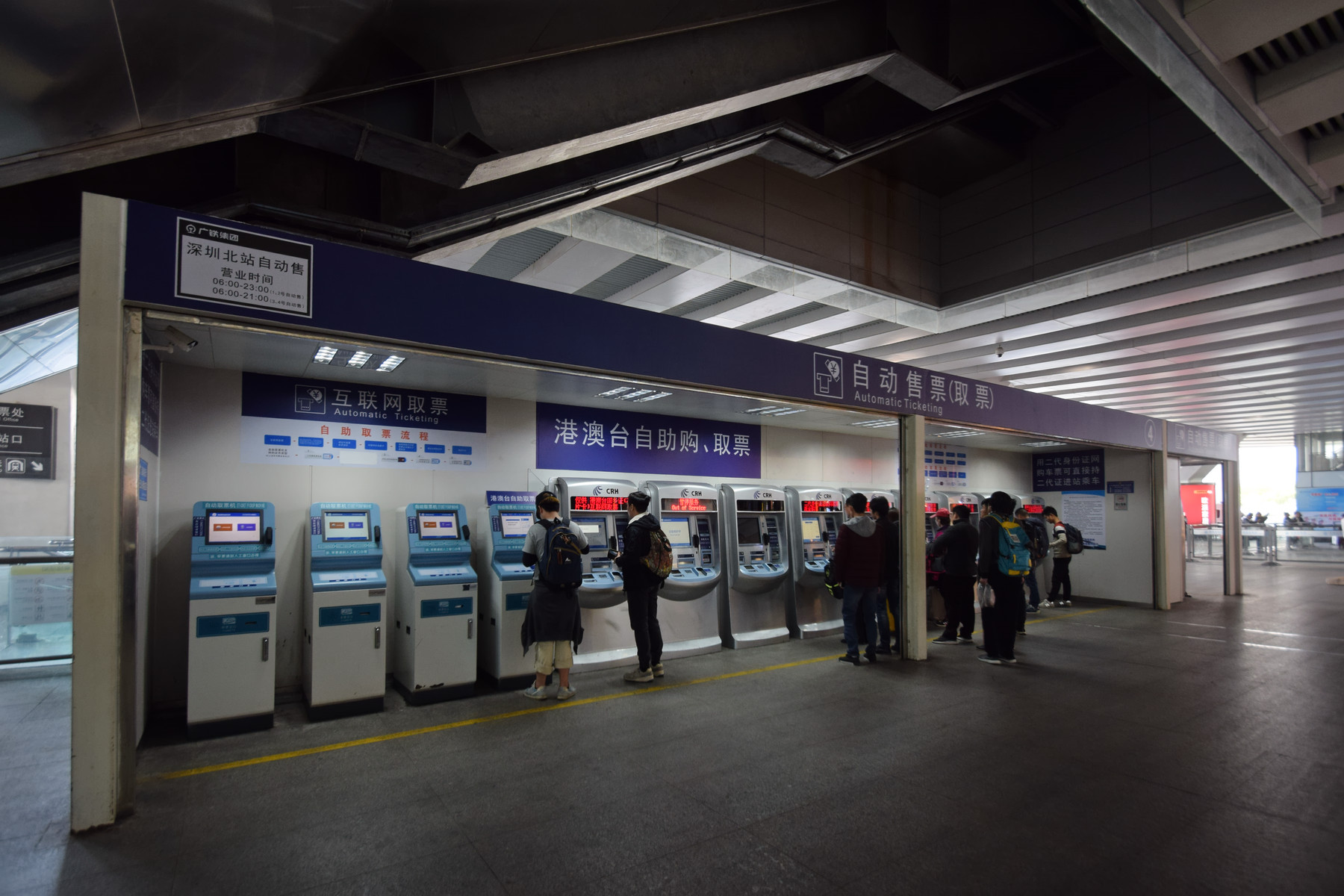
Ticket machines outside the station

The national-rail station building has a floor area of about 75,000 m^{2} (810,000 sq ft). It uses an elevated over-track waiting-hall arrangement, with east and west station buildings connected by the hall above the tracks. Commuter-style C-series trains toward Shenzhen Pingshan, Huiyang and Futian use a dedicated waiting room on the basement level.

Unlike most large railway stations in mainland China, Shenzhen North was designed around an "upper-entry, upper-exit" passenger flow, in which both entering and exiting high-speed rail passengers are organized through the elevated traffic level. The design reduced the need for a large traditional forecourt and allowed transfers among railway, metro, buses, taxis and coaches within the hub. In 2024 the station extended its in-station transfer route into the waiting hall, shortening walking distance for transferring passengers. By 2025, the rebuilt transfer passage handled more than 60,000 transfer passengers on an average day and up to 80,000 on peak days.

=== Platform layout ===
==== CRH ====
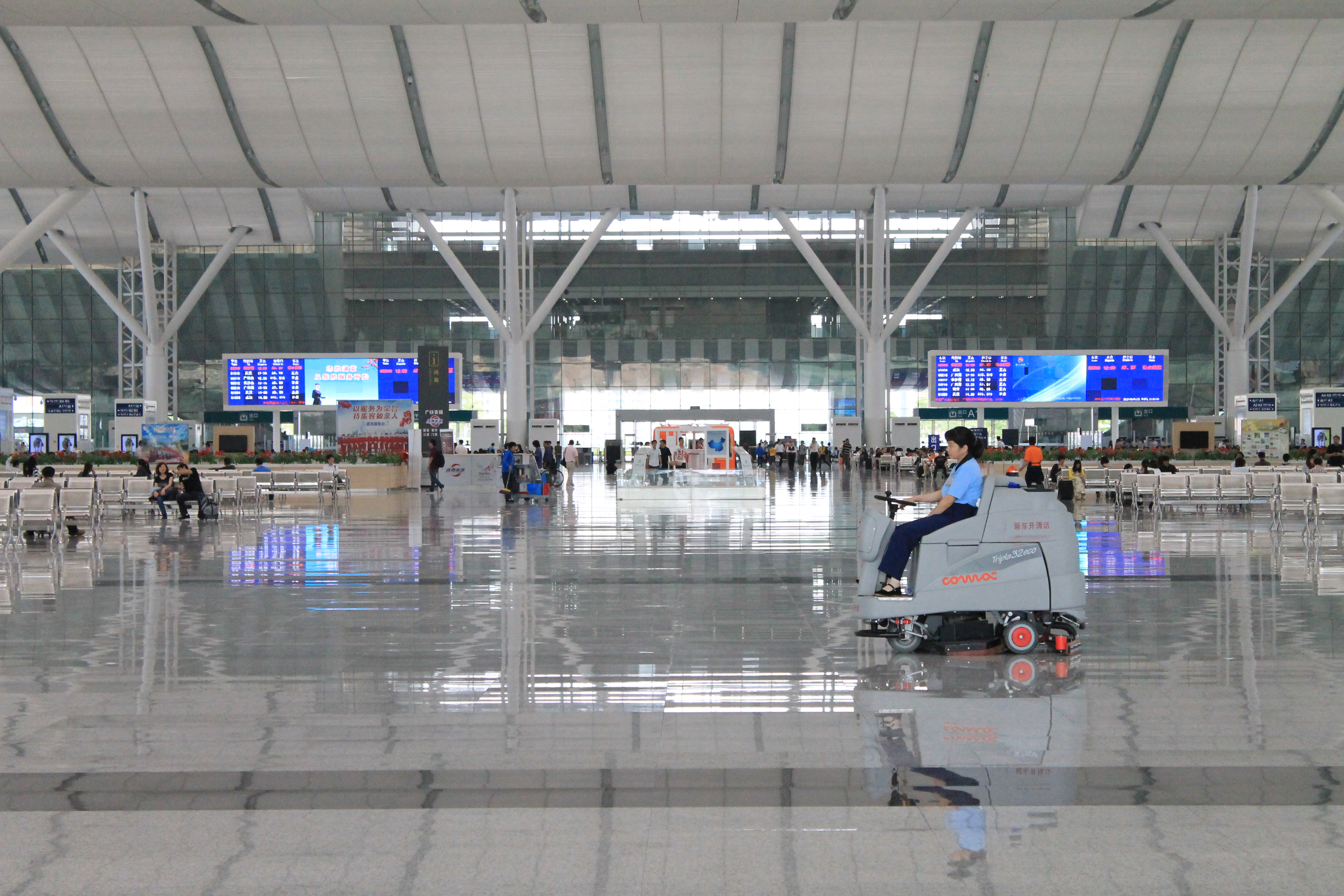
CRH station concourse

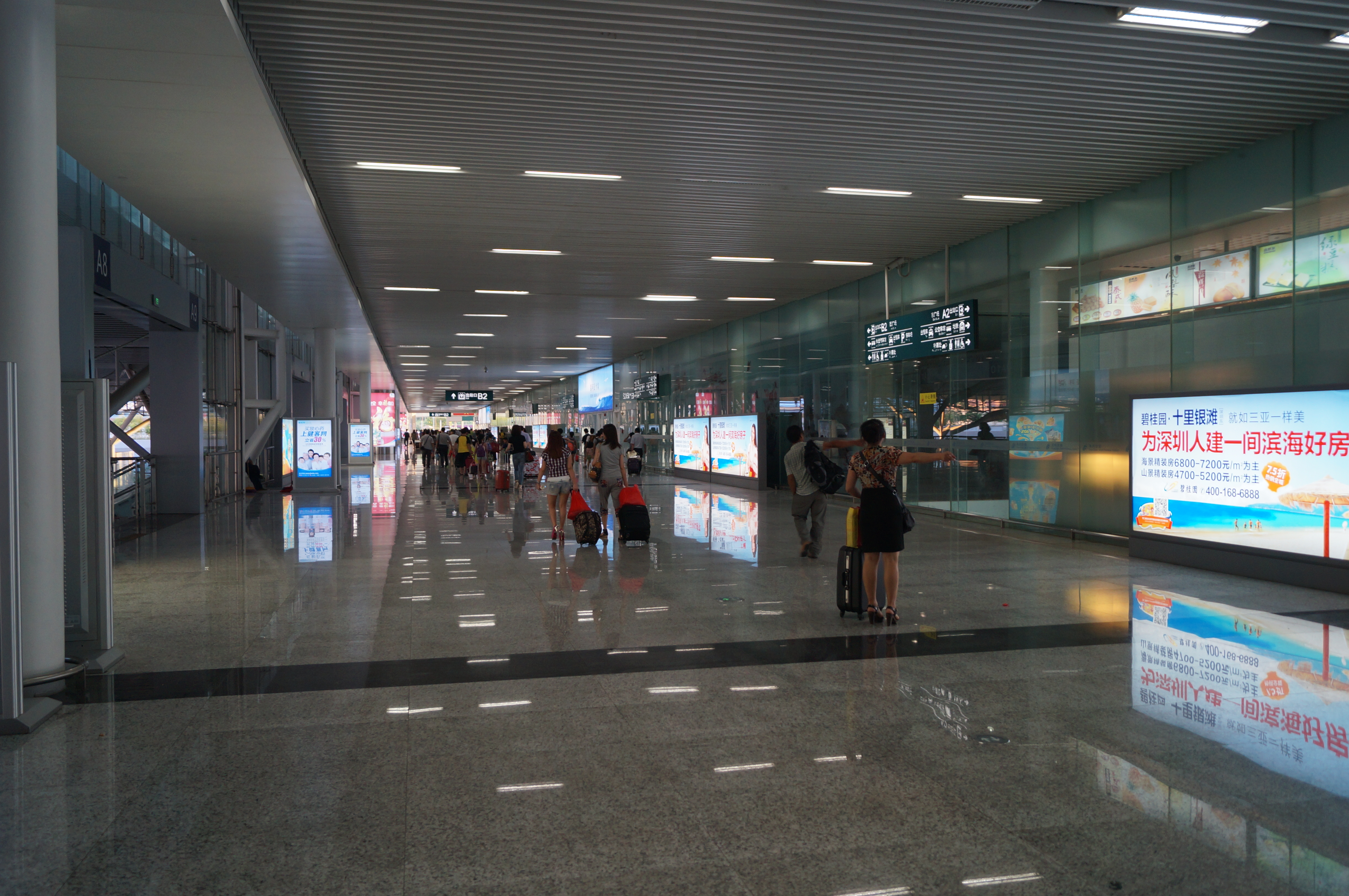
Exit passageway

The China Railway section has 11 platforms and 20 tracks, arranged from east to west as nine island platforms and two side platforms. Platforms 8 to 15 are assigned to cross-boundary services. Because some through Guangzhou-Shenzhen-Hong Kong trains do not stop at Shenzhen North, safety barriers are installed beside the main-line tracks at platforms 11 and 12. Some trains between Hong Kong West Kowloon and Fuzhou, Xiamen, Chaoshan or Shantou reverse direction at Shenzhen North and therefore remain in the station for a longer operational stop.

G
Concourse
Lobby level
High speed rail ticket office, ticket vending machines, ticket gates and waiting areas
restaurants, toilets
2F

Platforms

←Futian/HK direction
Guangzhou South/Guangmingcheng direction→
Side Platform
1 Platform
Trains
2 Platform
Trains
Island platform
3 Platform
Trains
4 Platform
Trains
Island platform
5 Platform
Trains
6 Platform
Trains
Island platform
7 Platform
Trains
8 Platform
Cross Border Trains to/from Hong Kong
Island platform
9 Platform
Cross Border Trains to/from Hong Kong
10 Platform
Cross Border Trains to/from Hong Kong
Island platform
11 Platform
Guangzhou-Shenzhen-Hong Kong XRL to West Kowloon
12 Platform
Guangzhou-Shenzhen-Hong Kong XRL to Guangzhou South
Island platform
13 Platform
Cross Border Trains to/from Hong Kong
14 Platform
Cross Border Long Distance Trains to/from mainland Chinese cities
Island platform
15 Platform
Cross Border Long Distance Trains to/from mainland Chinese cities
16 Platform
Trains
Island platform
17 Platform
Trains
18 Platform
Trains
Island platform
19 Platform
Trains
20 Platform
Trains
Side Platform

==== Shenzhen Metro ====
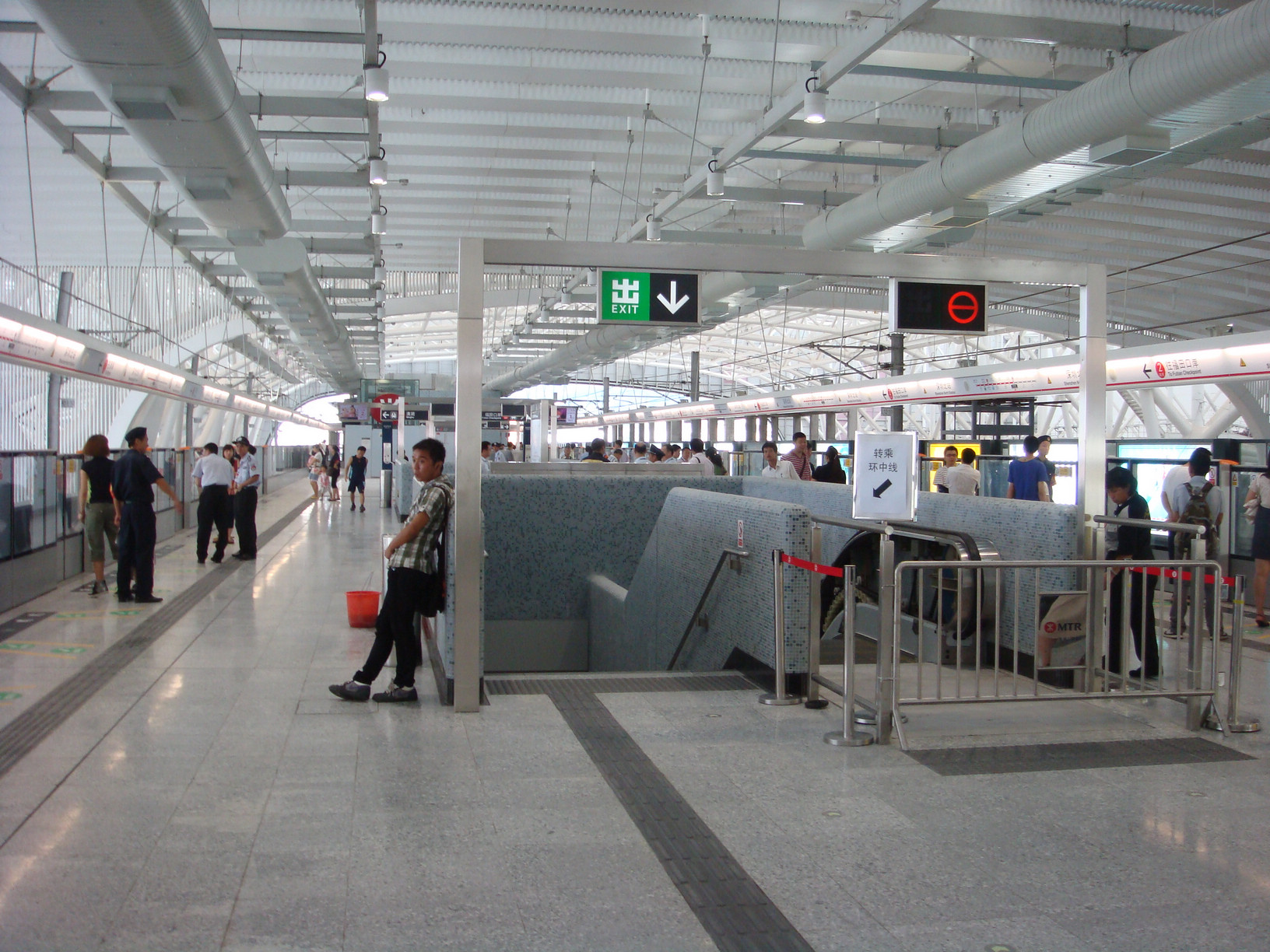
Line 4 platforms

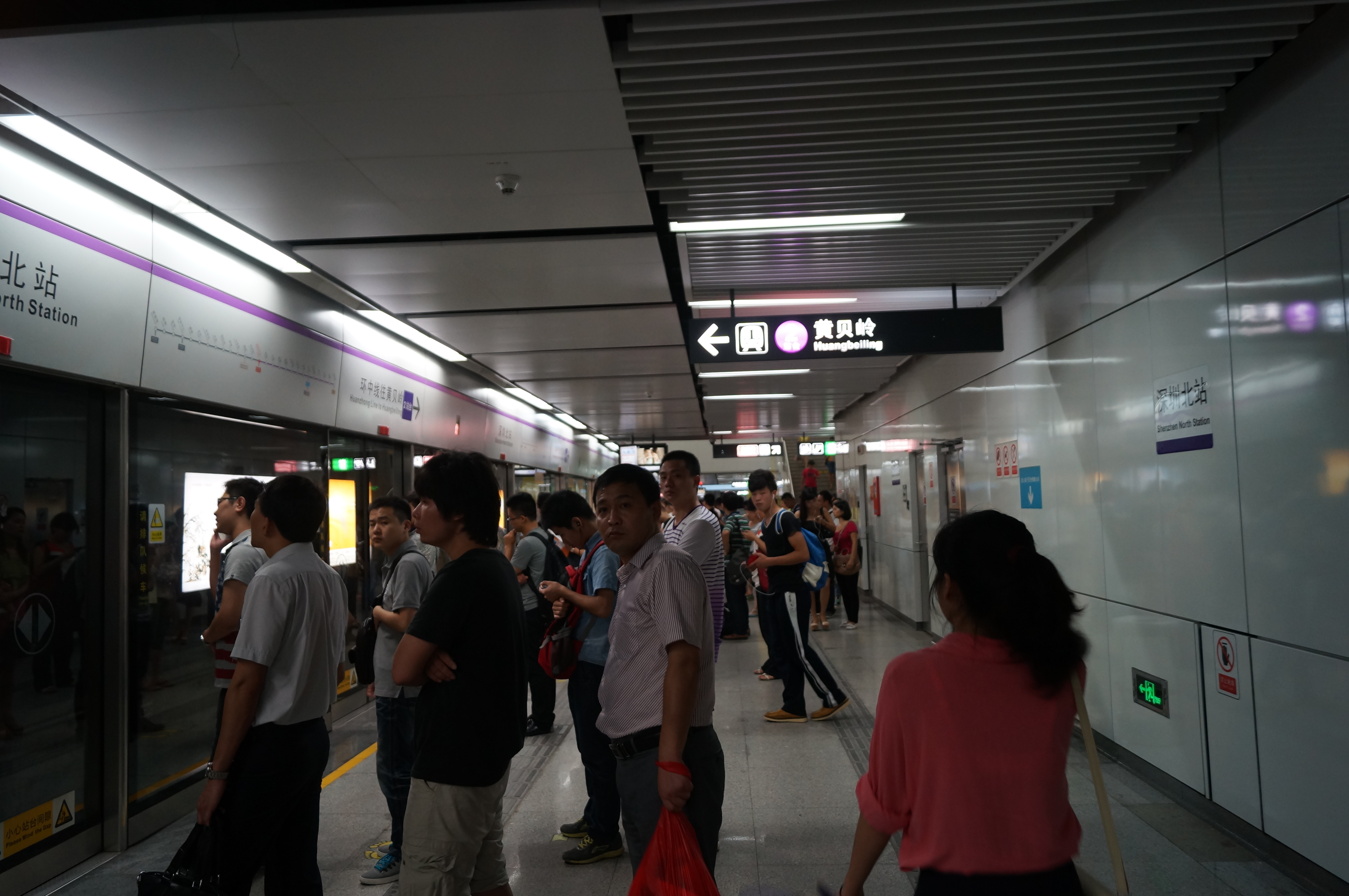
Line 5 platform

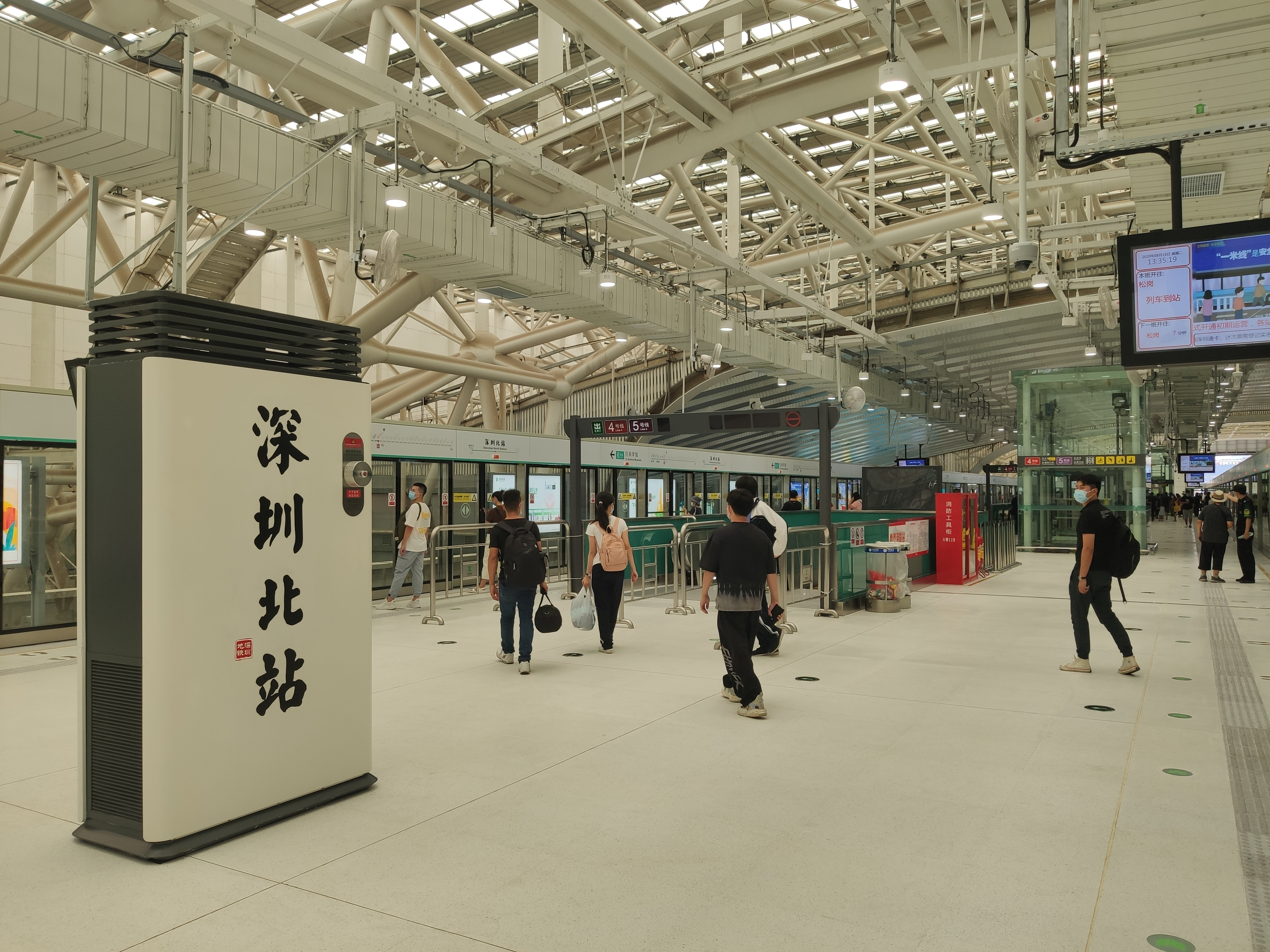
Line 6 platform

5F; Platforms	Platform	← 6 towards Science Museum (Meilingguan)
5F; Platforms	Island platform, doors will open on the left
5F; Platforms	Platform	→ 6 towards Songgang (Hongshan) →
5F; Platforms	Platform 2	← 4 towards Futian Checkpoint (Baishilong)
5F; Platforms	Island platform, doors will open on the left
5F; Platforms	Platform 1	→ 4 towards Niuhu (Hongshan) →
4F Concourse	Lobby of Line 4 and Line 6	Customer service, shops, vending machines, ATMs, full body scanners (except transfer passage); Transfer passage between Line 4, Line 5 and Line 6
3F	West Square Plaza	Shenzhen North railway station waiting room, ticket office, exits
2F		Shenzhen North railway station platforms
G	Pedestrian road	High speed rail arrivals hall
B1F; Concourse	Pedestrian road	Park, pedestrian business street, parking, lobby of Line 5, full body scanners (except transfer passage); Transfer passage between Line 4, Line 5 and Line 6
B2F; Platforms	-	Pinghu–Nanshan Railway (no stop)
B2F; Platforms	Side platform, doors will open on the right
B2F; Platforms	Platform	← 5 towards Chiwan (Changlingpi)
B2F; Platforms	Platform	→ 5 towards Grand Theater (Minzhi) →
B2F; Platforms	Side platform, doors will open on the right
B2F; Platforms	-	Pinghu–Nanshan Railway (no stop)

== Operations ==
=== Train services ===
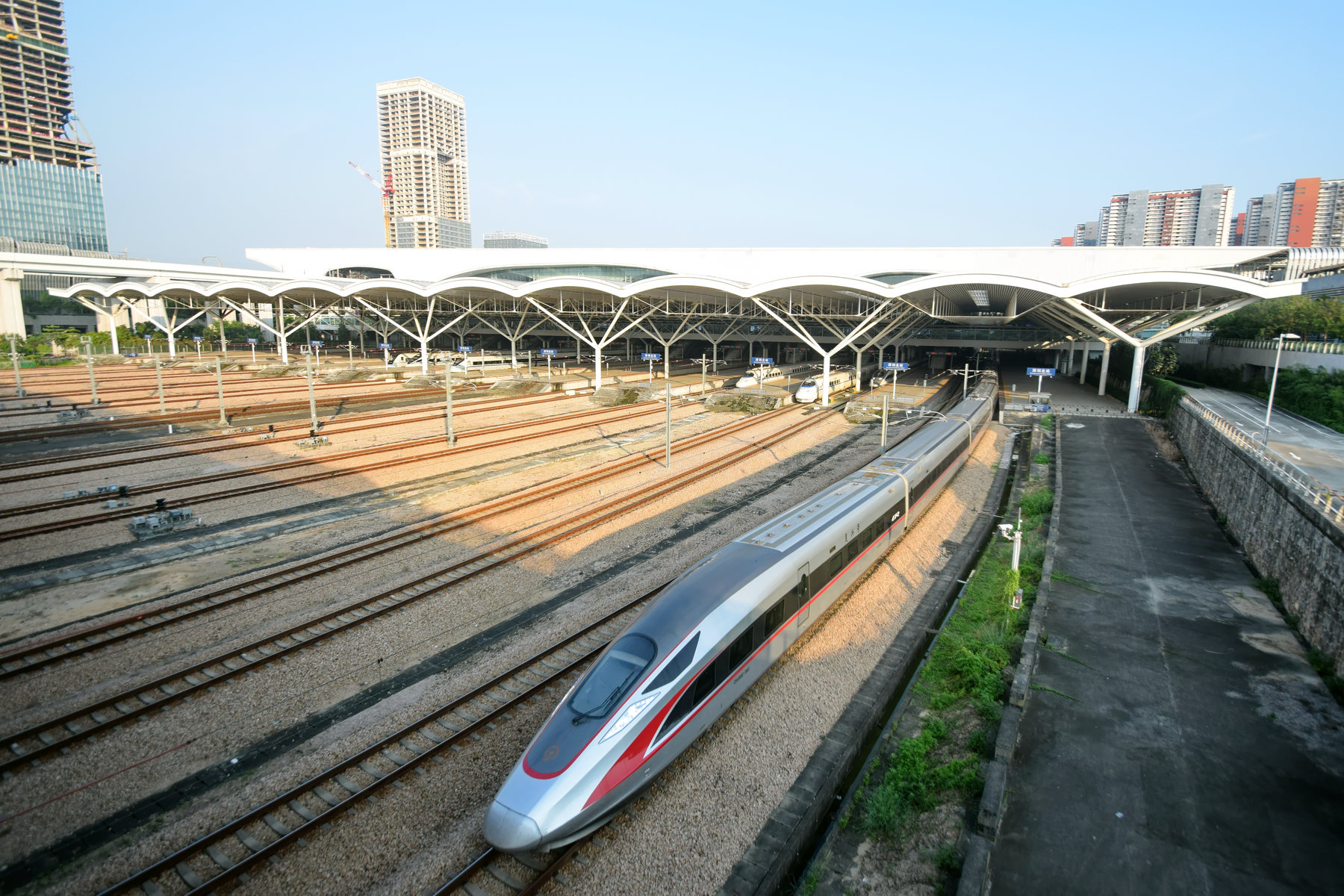
A Fuxing CR400AF train departing Shenzhen North

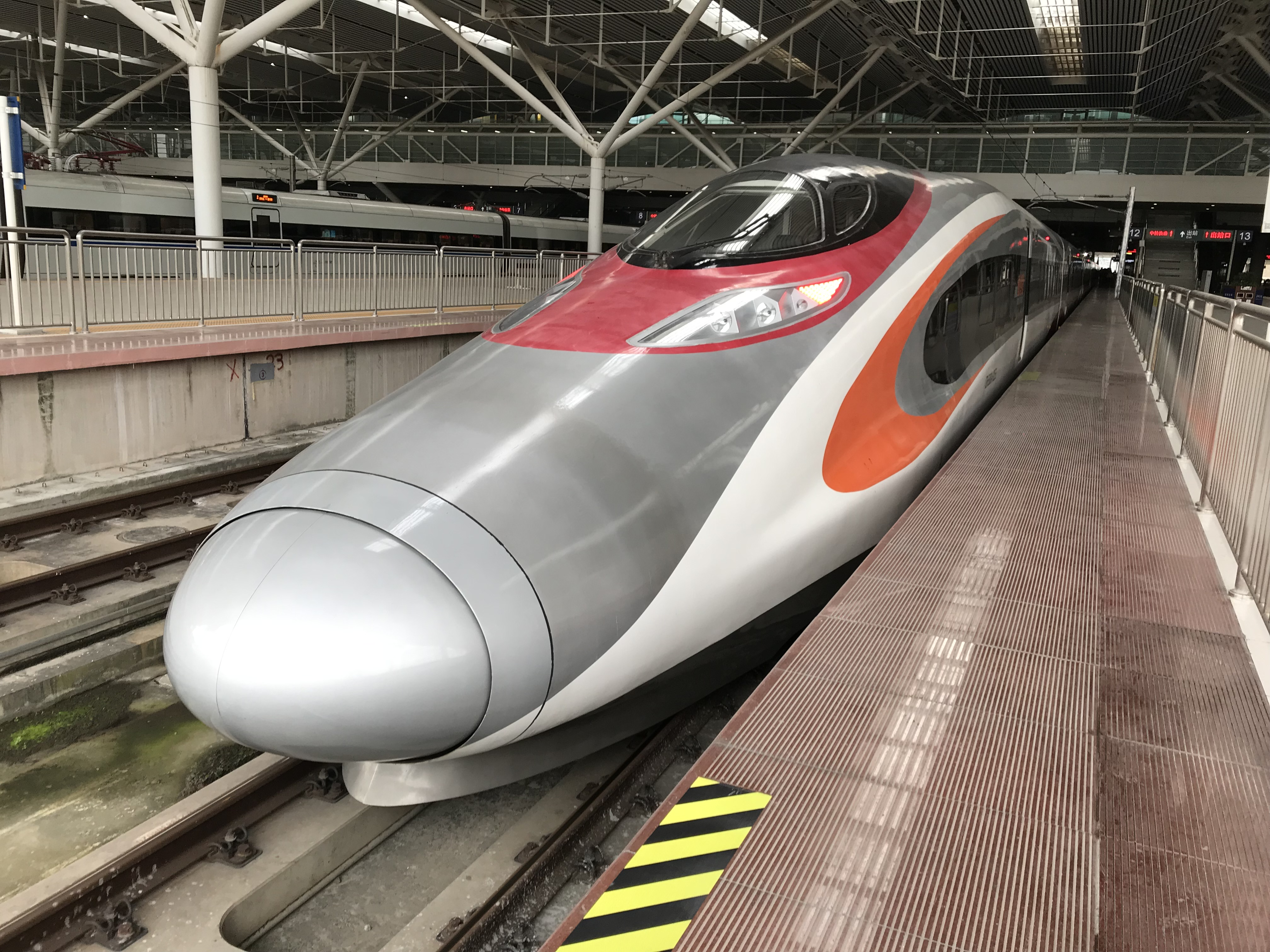
An MTR CRH380A Vibrant Express train at Shenzhen North

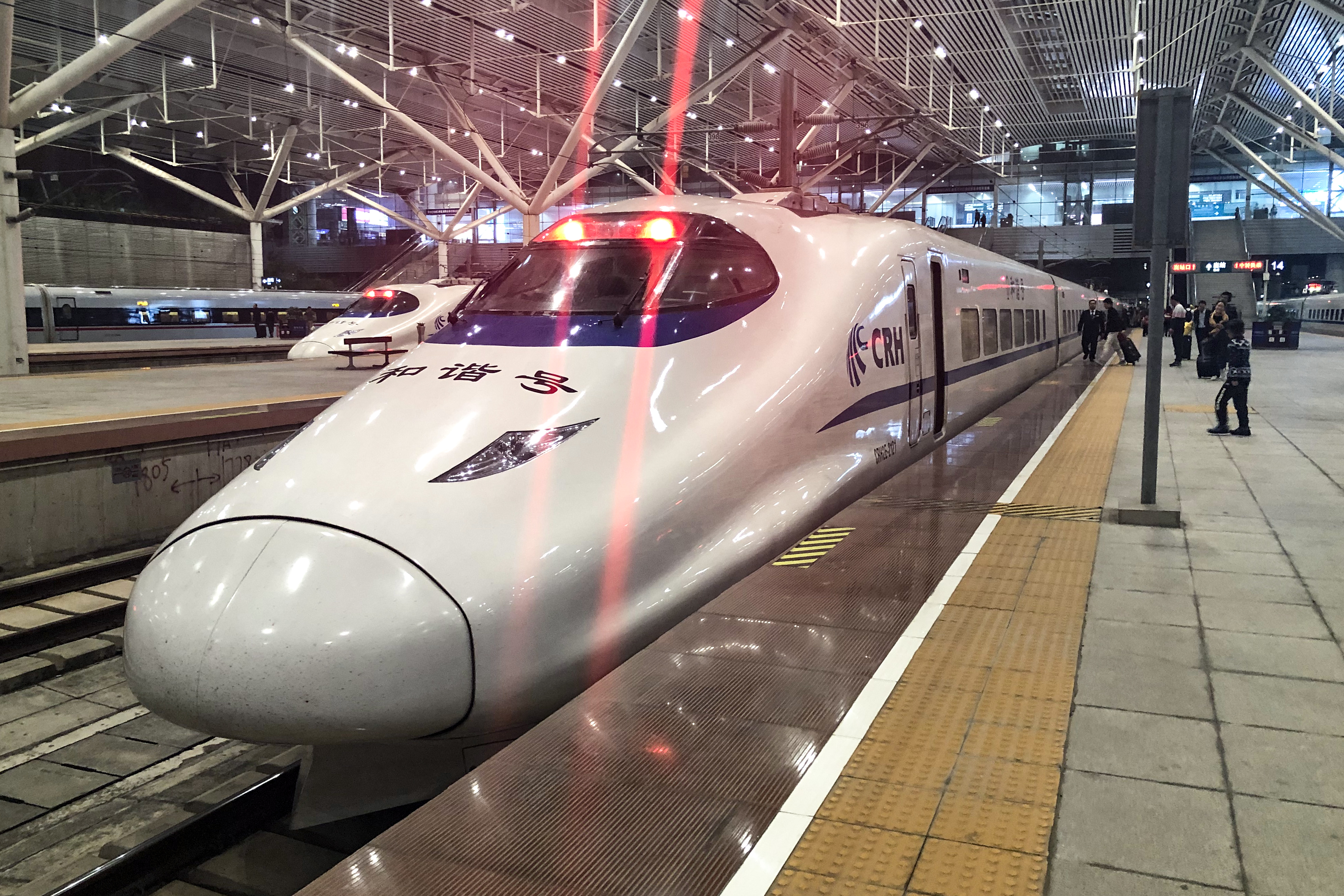
A sleeper EMU service to Beijing West waiting to depart

As of the national railway timetable introduced on 1 July 2026, Shenzhen North was scheduled for 848 EMU train movements a day. It is one of Shenzhen's two principal intercity passenger stations, alongside Shenzhen railway station, and functions as the southern Shenzhen high-speed hub for trains on the Guangzhou-Shenzhen-Hong Kong, Hangzhou-Fuzhou-Shenzhen and Ganzhou-Shenzhen corridors.

The opening of the Xiamen-Shenzhen Railway on 28 December 2013 added coastal services toward eastern Guangdong and Fujian, initially including D-series trains to Chaoshan, Xiamen, Fuzhou, Longyan, Wenzhou, Hangzhou, Nanchang, Nanjing and Hefei. After the opening of the Guiyang-Guangzhou and Nanning-Guangzhou high-speed railways in late 2014, Shenzhen North gained services toward Guilin, Nanning and Huaihua. In 2015, overnight sleeper EMU services began to Beijing West and Shanghai Hongqiao, followed by additional long-distance G-series services to Hefei, Jinan and Chongqing.

On 1 September 2015, Shenzhen North opened the Pingshan Express Link commuter EMU service, initially operating 12 pairs of C-series trains between Shenzhen North and Shenzhen Pingshan. The service was later reduced to five pairs from 5 January 2017. The same January 2017 timetable change also added commuter-style services to Huizhou South, now Huiyang, and Shanwei, as well as high-speed trains to Kunming South.

In October 2020 a train pair between Shenzhen North and Chengdu East opened as the station's first high-speed service using the Chengdu-Guiyang corridor. It was renumbered in January 2021 and extended to Hong Kong West Kowloon on 1 July 2023.

=== Passenger volume ===
Shenzhen North's annual passenger arrivals and departures exceeded 116 million in 2024 and 126 million in 2025, placing it third among railway stations in China in 2025. During the 2026 Labour Day holiday period, the station handled 4.5751 million passenger arrivals and departures over eight days. On 1 May 2026, it handled 735,700 arrivals and departures in a single day, including 407,200 departures, setting new station records.

=== Principal destinations ===
Shenzhen North serves intercity and long-distance high-speed destinations across the Beijing-Guangzhou-Hong Kong, coastal, southwestern and central-southern high-speed rail networks. Major termini include Beijing West, Shanghai Hongqiao, Shanghai, Guangzhou South, Guangzhou East, Futian, Hong Kong West Kowloon, Xiamen, Xiamen North, Fuzhou, Fuzhou South, Chaoshan, Shantou, Shanwei, Shenzhen Pingshan, Huiyang, Wuhan, Changsha South, Nanchang West, Hefei South, Hangzhou East, Nanjing, Zhengzhou East, Xi'an North, Kunming South, Guiyang North, Chengdu East, Chongqing West, Guilin North, Nanning East, Beihai, Zhanjiang West and Zhuhai. Some services call at Shenzhen North while running through between Hong Kong West Kowloon and mainland termini.

== Connections ==
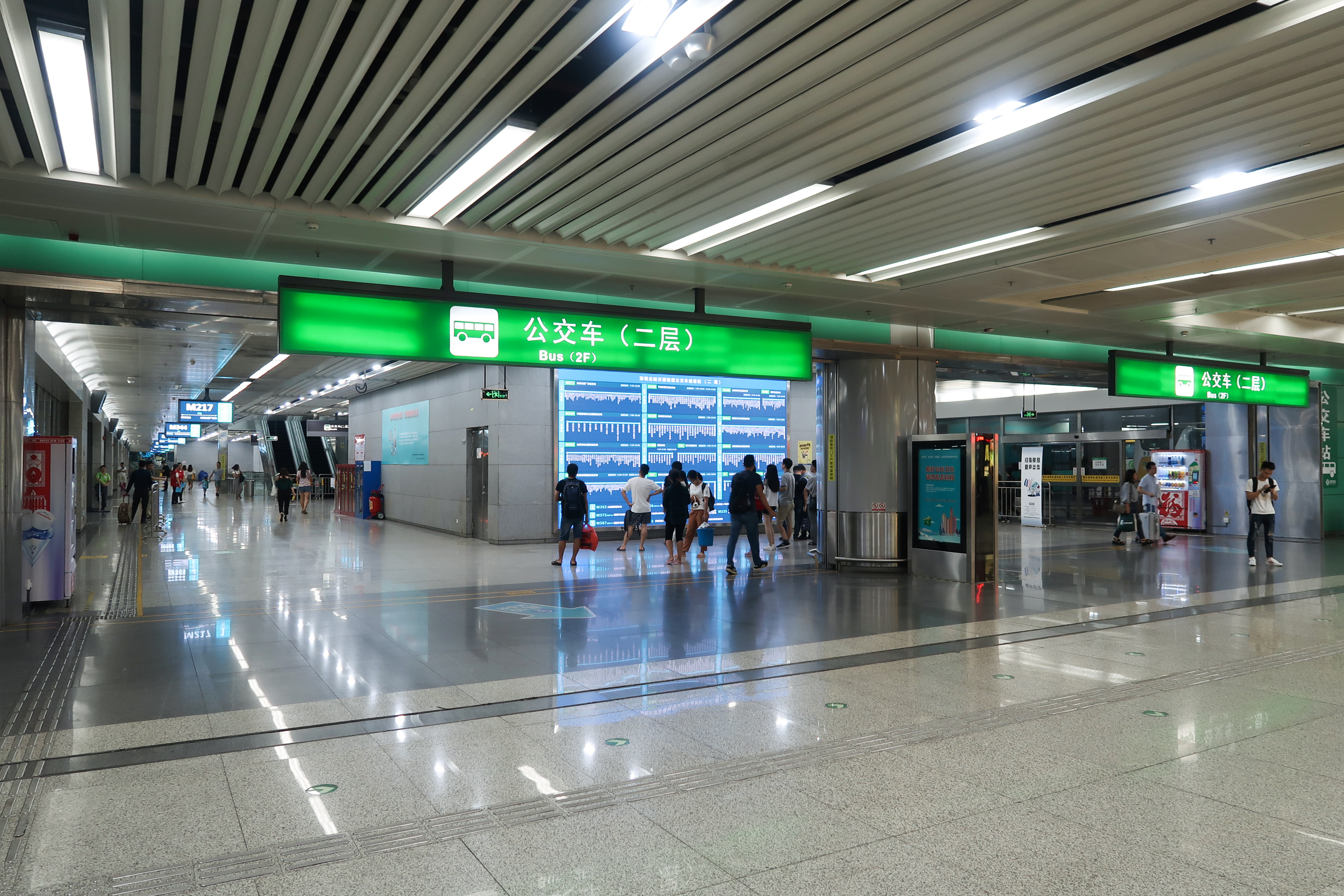
Bus terminal

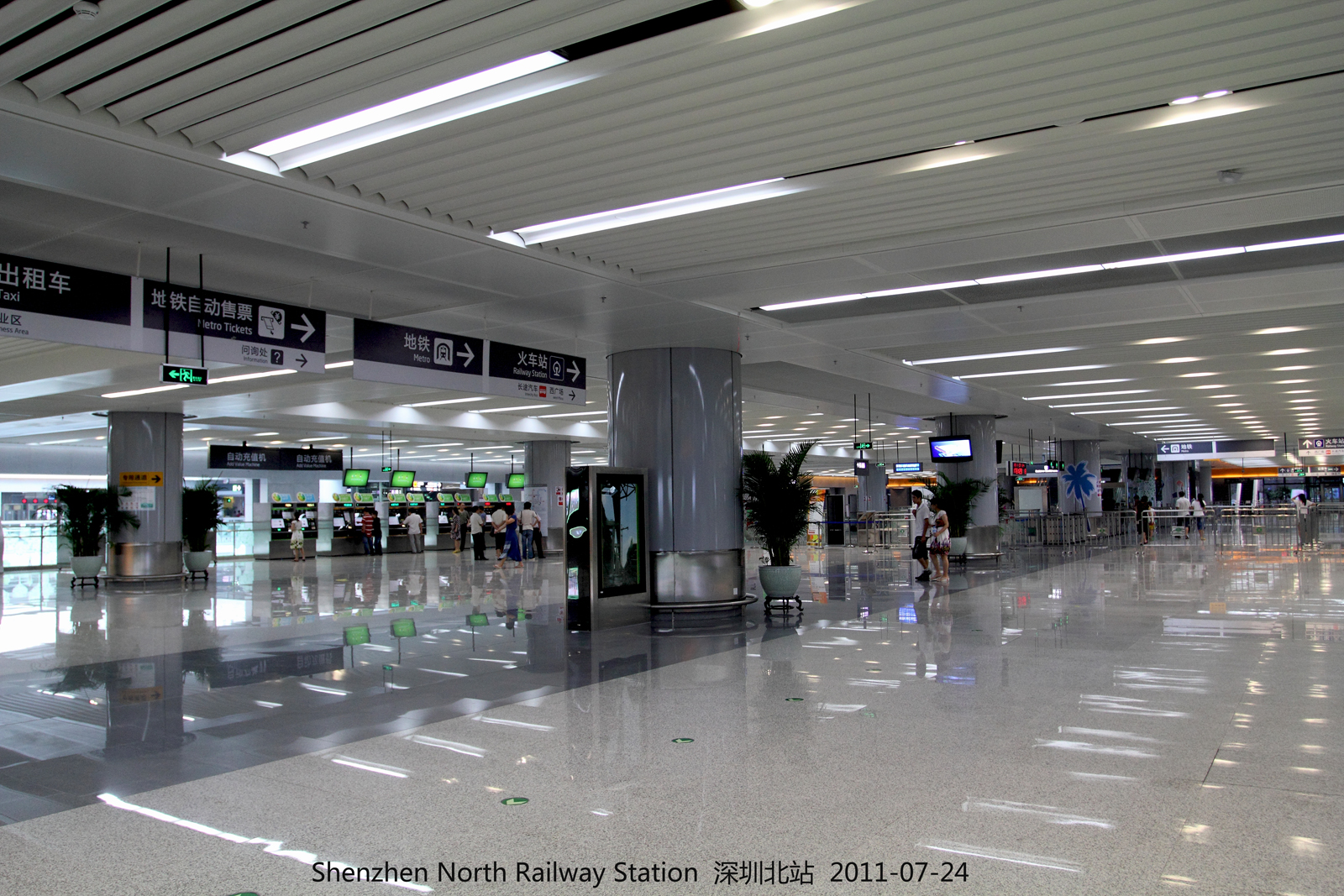
East Square underground hall

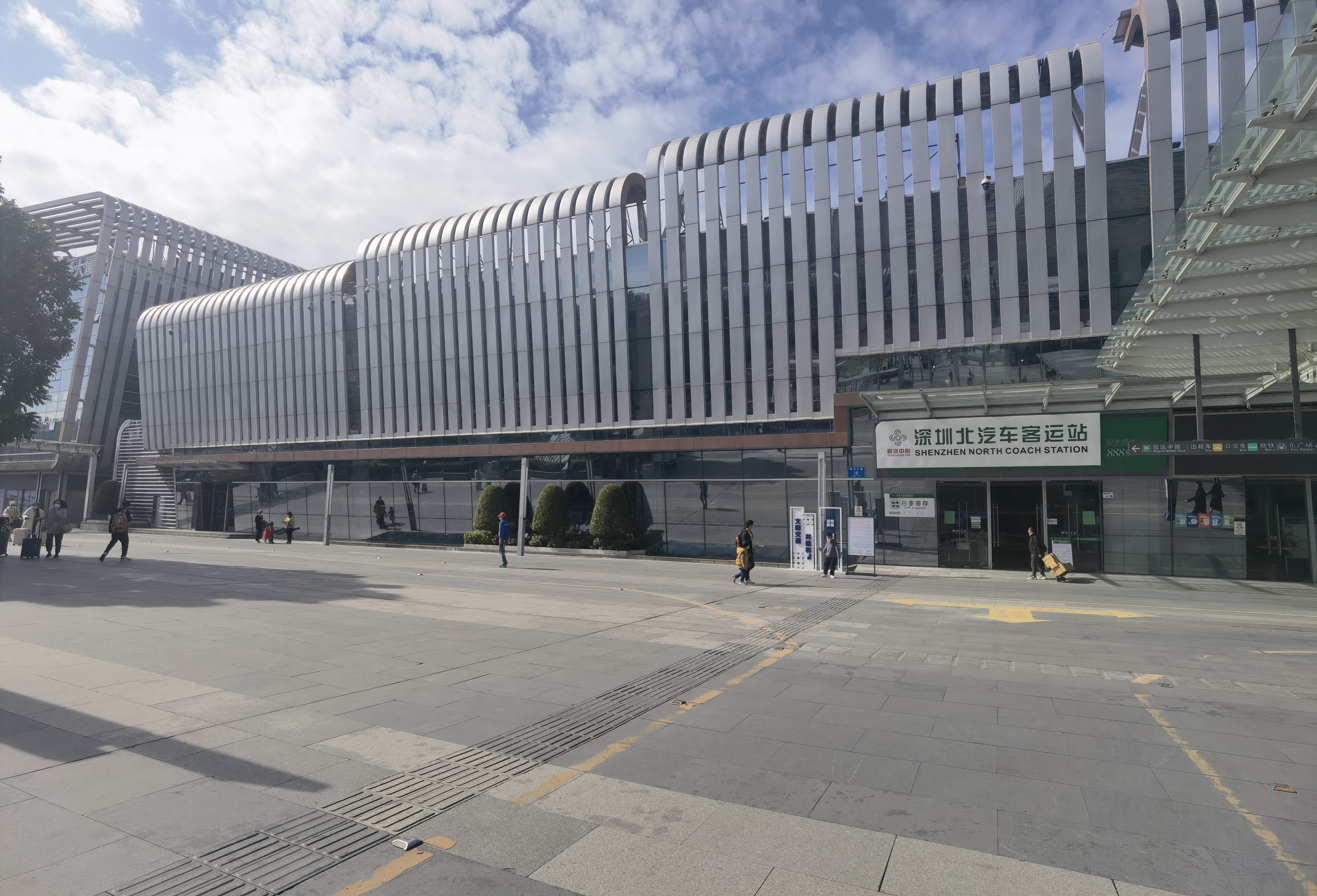
Shenzhen North Coach Station

Shenzhen North connects with Line 4, Line 5 and Line 6 of the Shenzhen Metro. Lines 4 and 6 are elevated through East Square, while Line 5 runs underground across the station complex.

Both East Square and West Square have bus termini and intermediate bus stops, with more routes concentrated at East Square. The East Square bus terminal has a floor area of about 34,000 m^{2} (370,000 sq ft) and parking space for 74 buses; its first and second levels are boarding areas, while the third level is an alighting area. More than 20 local bus routes serve the station area, including intermediate stops on Mintang Road outside East Square and on Zhiyuan Middle Road outside West Square.

The adjacent Shenzhen North Coach Station is on the north side of West Square. It has a floor area of 5,076 m^{2} (54,640 sq ft), 33 coach bays and eight ticket windows, and opened on 28 April 2012. It has operated routes to Guangzhou, Huizhou, Heyuan, eastern Guangdong and Hong Kong, with a projected daily passenger-sending capacity of 20,000.

== Facilities and development ==
The station's car parks are mainly beneath West Square on the B1 and B2 levels and provide 1,971 parking spaces. A taxi parking area on B1 can hold about 300 taxis.

East Square includes a commercial area known as Bingo Space, created by Yitian Group from part of the L1 and L2 floors. The roughly 30,000 m^{2} (320,000 sq ft) shopping area opened in the fourth quarter of 2014 and is mainly occupied by restaurants, clothing stores and sports-brand outlets. Another commercial project, Youyue Times Plaza, was developed on the third to fifth floors on the south side of East Square, also with about 30,000 m^{2} (320,000 sq ft) of floor area.

Northeast of the station, Shenzhen Metro and its partners developed two over-station commercial projects: Huilong Business Center and Huide Building. The developments include Grade-A offices, hotels and retail space, and were designed by Murphy/Jahn. Vienna Hotels has also listed its corporate headquarters at the Vienna International Hotel in the West Square complex.

== Gallery ==
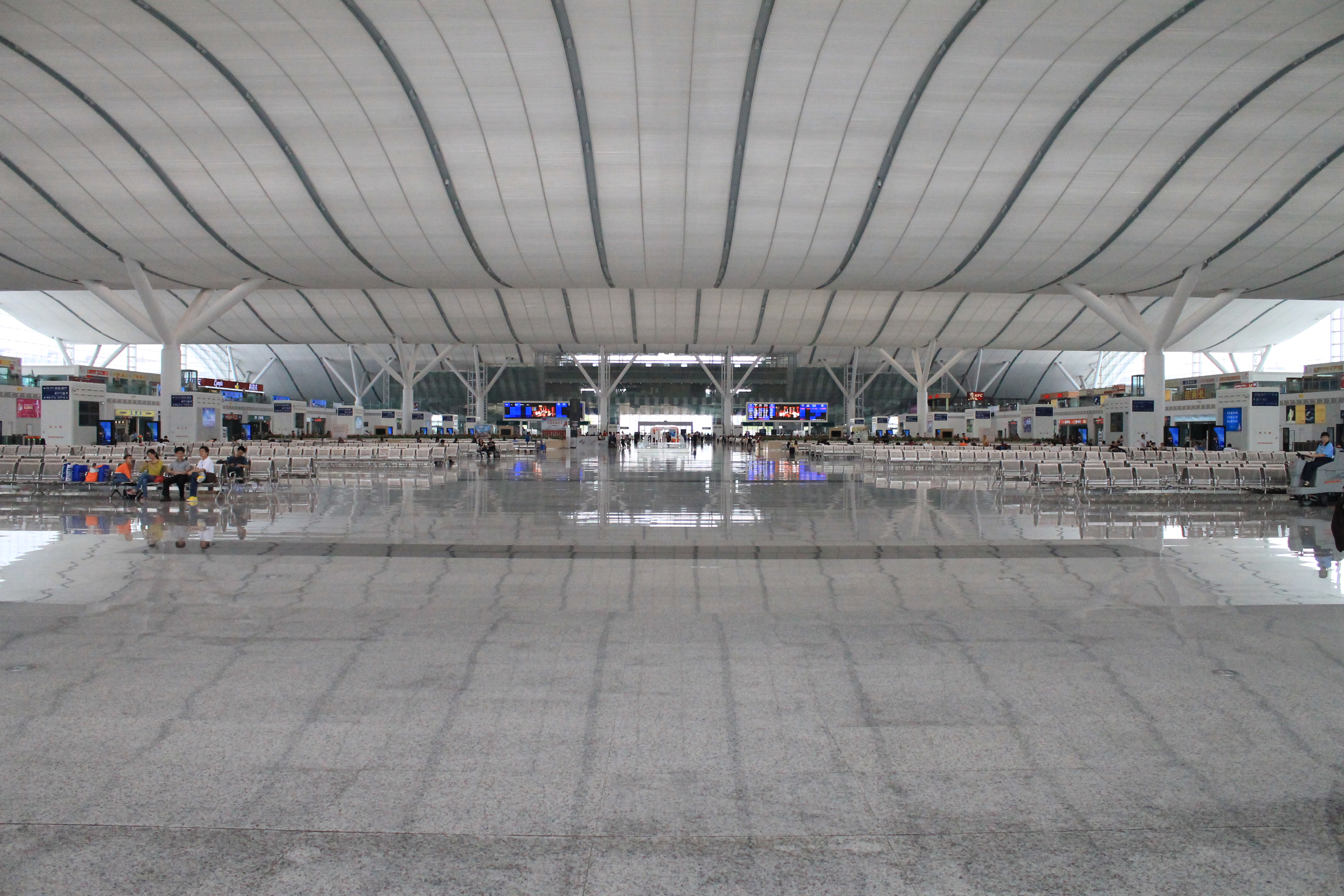
Interior of Shenzhen North railway station, 2012

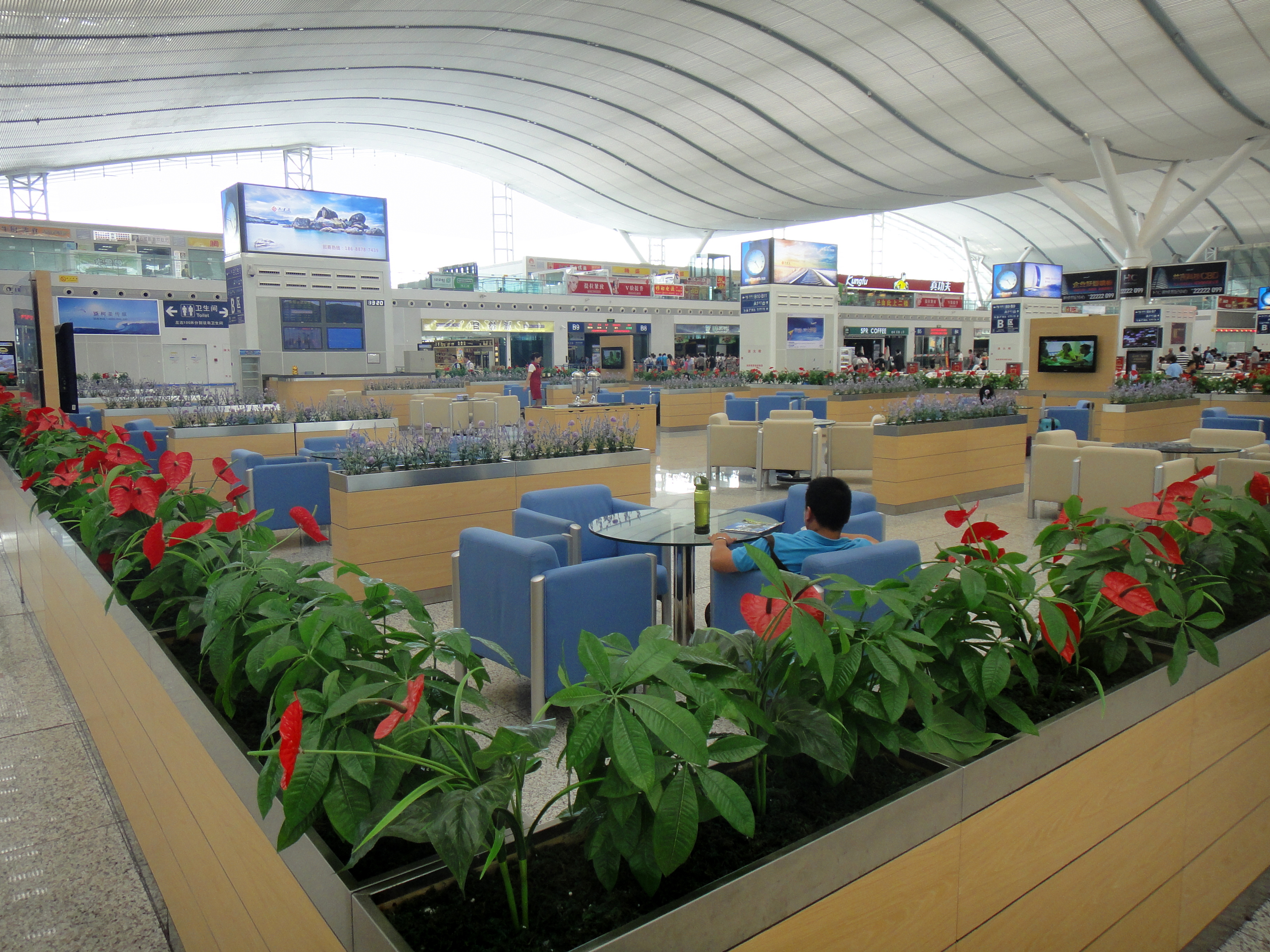
Business class passengers can rest in this area within the vast waiting hall.

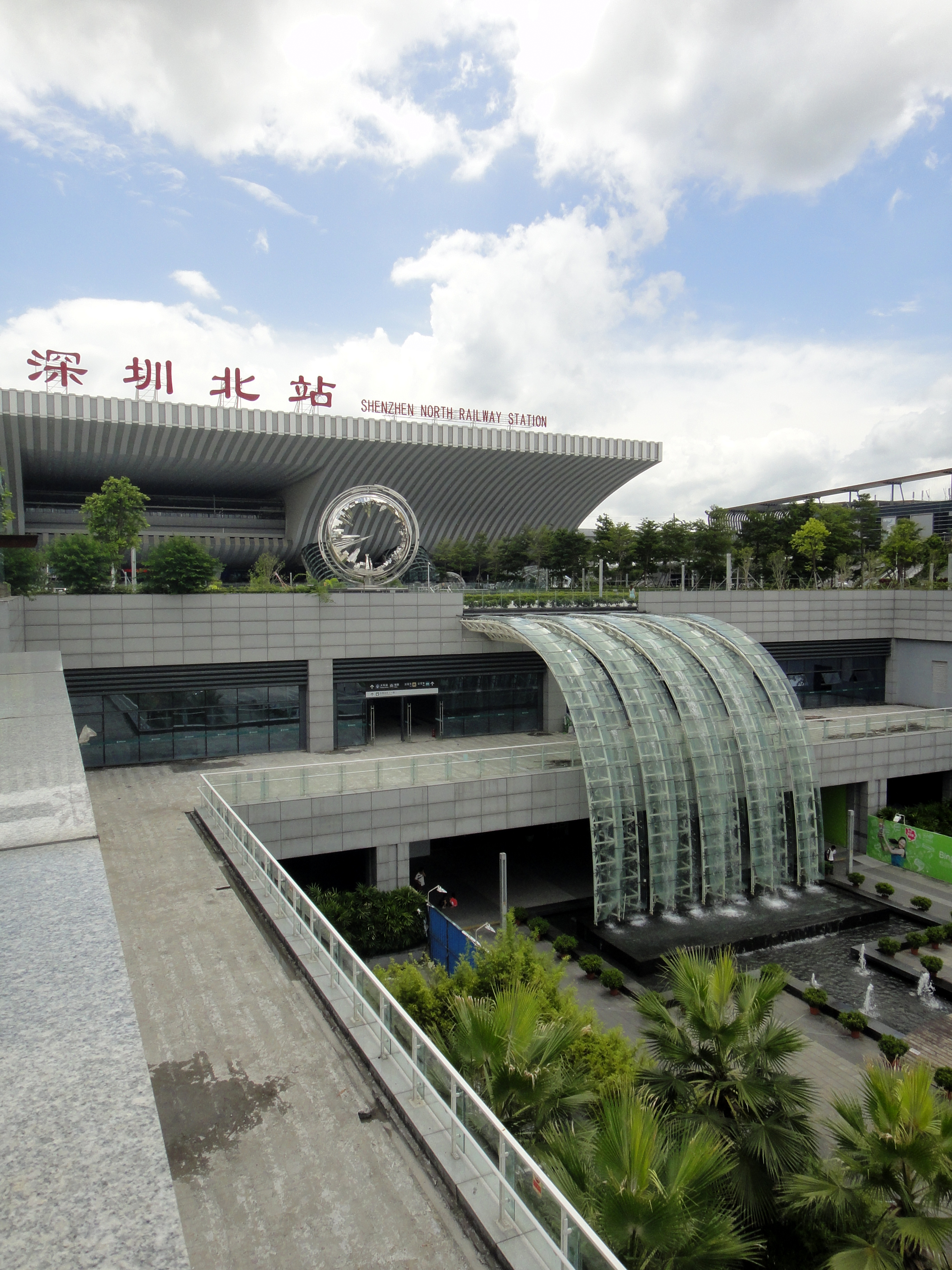
Looking across the waterfall feature on the east square.

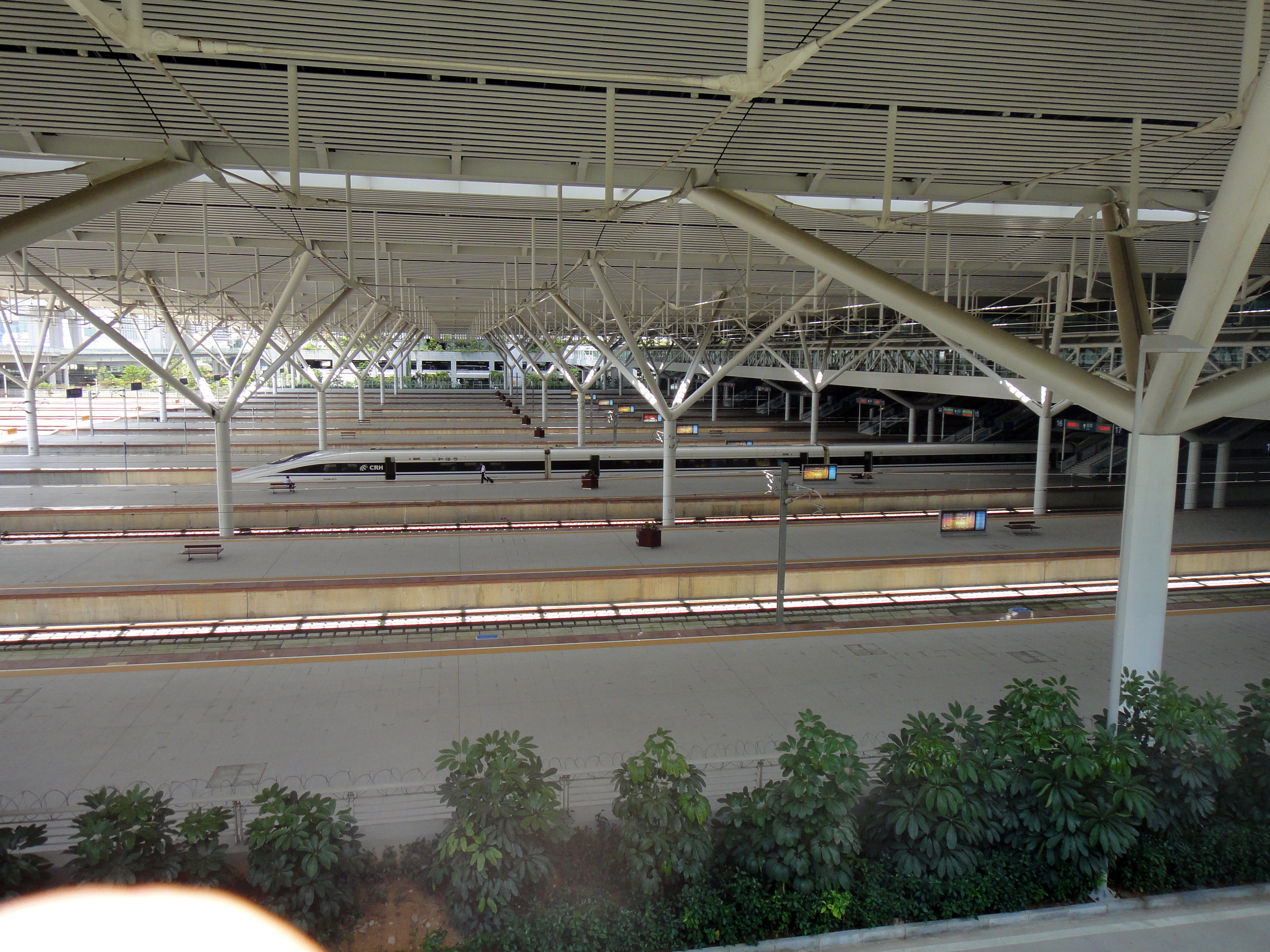
Looking across the extensive platforms of Shenzhen North railway station. The train in clear view is a longer 16 car train, 8 car high speed trains are hidden under the main station building.

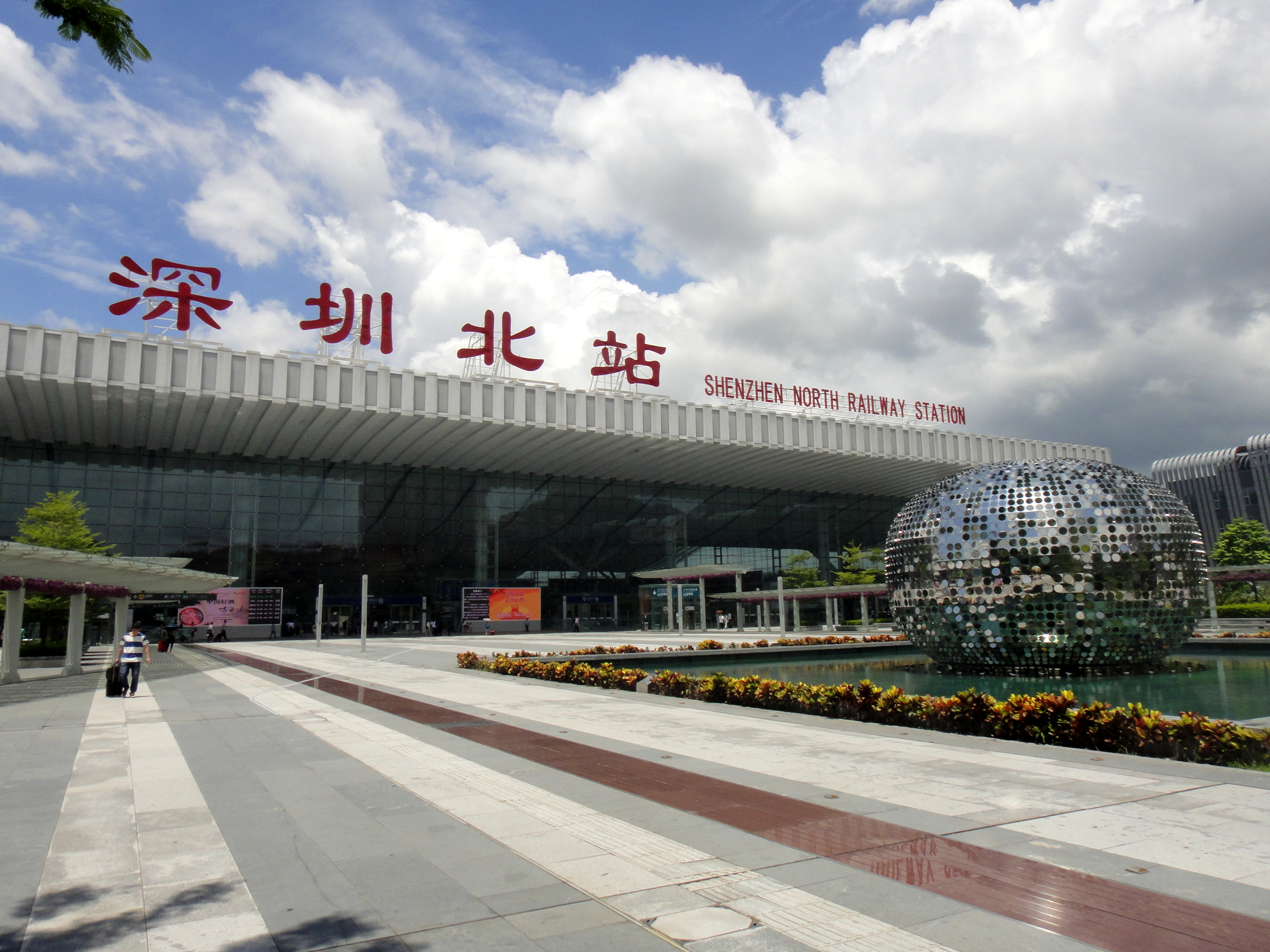
Looking at Shenzhen North railway station from the vast west square. Long-distance coach stations are located to the left and right of this picture.

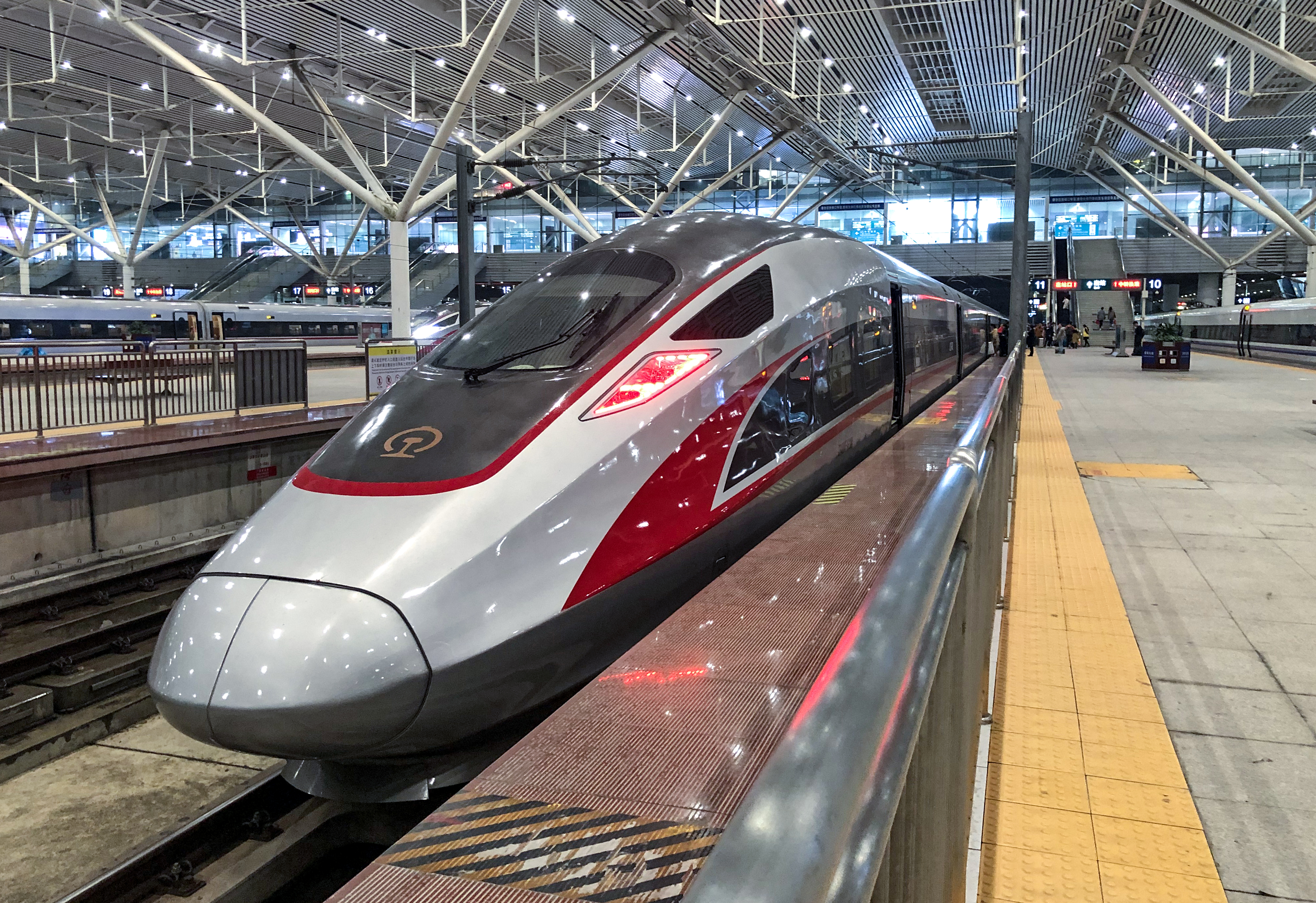
A CR400AF-A at Shenzhen North railway station, on the Guangzhou–Shenzhen–Hong Kong Express Rail Link

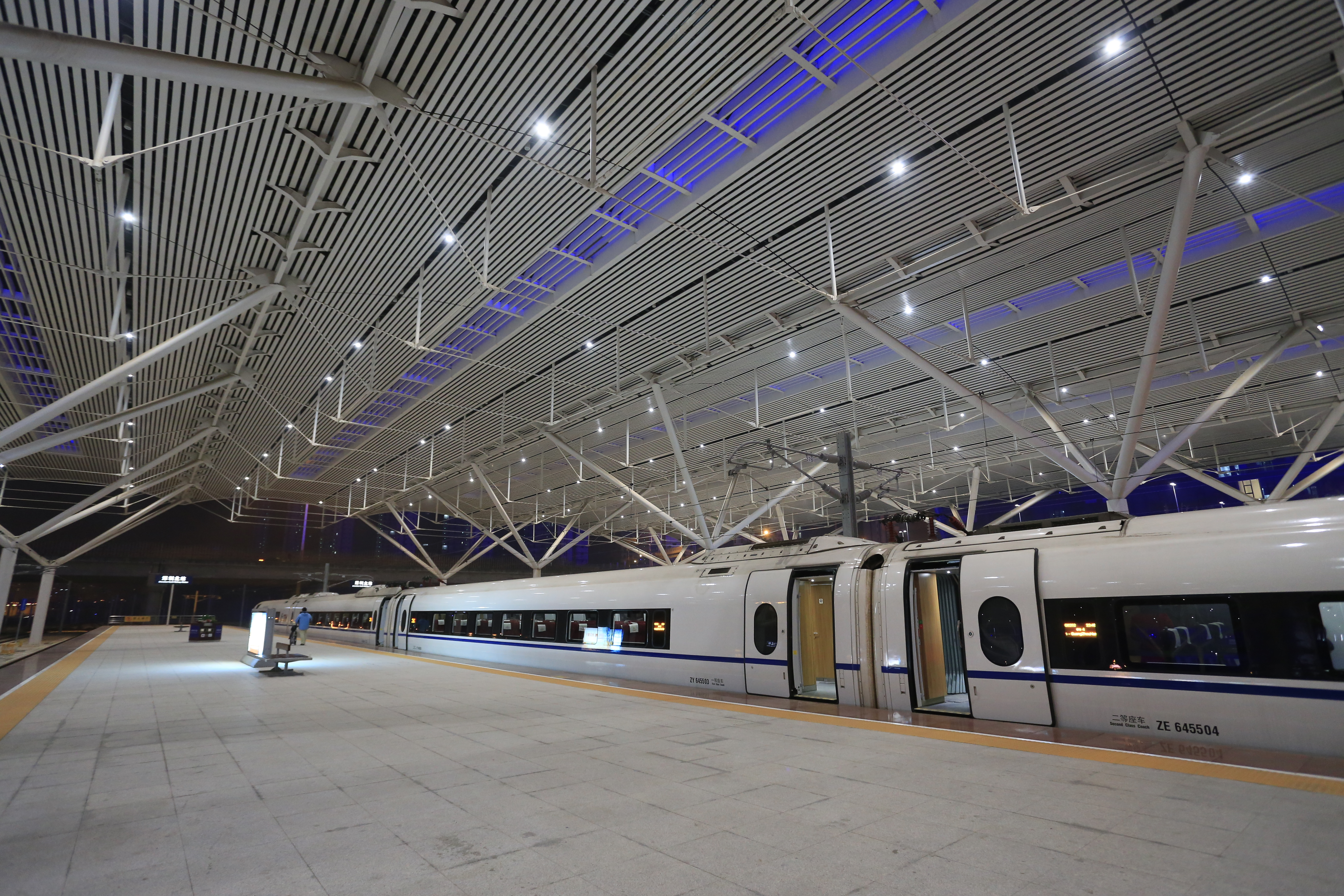
Shenzhen North railway station platform

== Exits ==
Exit	Destination
Exit A	Liuxian Boulevard, Minzhi Huachang, Colourful Inn & Colourful Star Hotel
Exit B	Shangtang Road, Meilong Road, Railway Bridge
Exit C	Yulong Road, Shenzhen North Railway Station
Exit D	Xinqü Boulevard, St. Moritz, Xiyuan Villa, Long-distance Bus Station

== See also ==
- Guangzhou–Shenzhen–Hong Kong Express Rail Link
- Shenzhen Metro

Preceding station	China Railway High-speed	Following station
Guangmingcheng towards Beijing West	Beijing–Guangzhou–Shenzhen–Hong Kong high-speed railway	Futian towards Hong Kong West Kowloon
Shenzhen Pingshan towards Xiamen North	Xiamen–Shenzhen railway	Terminus
Guangmingcheng towards Ganzhou West	Ganzhou–Shenzhen high-speed railway	Terminus
Preceding station	Shenzhen Metro	Following station
Hongshan towards Niuhu	Line 4	Baishilong towards Futian Checkpoint
Minzhi towards Huangbeiling	Line 5	Changlingpi towards Chiwan
Hongshan towards Songgang	Line 6	Meilinguan towards Science Museum
