= List of bus routes in Shenzhen =

This is a list of the bus routes in Shenzhen, China, including all of the bus routes operating in Shenzhen and Inter-city bus service between Shenzhen and its neighboring cities, Huizhou, Dongguan or Hong Kong.

== Operators ==
Local	Neighborhood
Shenzhen Bus Group Co, ltd	Dongguan Bus Co, ltd
Shenzhen Eastern Bus Co, ltd	Huiyang Zhitong Container Transportation Co, ltd
Shenzhen Western Bus Co, ltd	Hong Kong Operators
Other operators will be remarked at "Operator" column.

== Numbering ==
=== Routes with E/M/B prefixes ===
E/M/B Prefixes Numbering Plan was issued by Transport Bureau of Shenzhen in Dec. 2008.

Prefix	Definition
**E**	Express routes These routes usually travel on expressways or highways with a few bus stops.
**M**	Main-line routes These routes usually travel on main roads or streets in the city with a distance longer than 10 km.
**B**	Branch routes These routes usually travel less than 20 km between main roads, streets and the neighborhoods, countries or schools.

Exceptions:

- Routes **M139**, **M191**, **M348**, **M362**, **M380**, **M447** and **M528** travel through expressways, but they are defined as Main-line routes.

=== Routes without prefixes ===
These routes are using former numbering plan now and may gradually be replaced by routes with E/M/B prefixes.

Route numbers	Definition
1-236	Central routes These routes usually travel in the central districts including Futian District, Luohu District, Nanshan District and Yantian District.
303-395	Cross-border routes These routes usually travel across the former border which separated the SEZ I and None-SEZ I areas.
603-791	Western routes These routes usually travel in Bao'an District, Longhua District and/or Guangming District.
802-982	Eastern routes These routes usually travel in Longgang District, Pingshan District and/or Dapeng New District.

Exceptions:

- Routes **8**, **43**, **58**, **60**, **61**, **74**, **75**, **81**, **82**, **85**, **222**, **836** and **977** travel across the former border.
- Route **882** travels through Longhua District and Longgang District.

=== Routes with other prefixes ===
Prefixes in use
English	Service time		Definition
A	Regular		Airport routes
Peak time	AM and/or PM rush hours Some of them regular		Peak-time routes
Peak time Express	AM and/or PM rush hours Some of them regular		Peak-time routes with express service
Sightseeing Series; Color-named	Regular		Sightseeing routes using double decker buses
Holiday Series; Named "Scenic Spot Name + Holiday"	Weekends and holidays		Special routes which link the city and the scenic spots
Shen-Hui	Regular		Inter-city bus routes between Shenzhen and Huizhou
Shenshan	Rush hours or regular		Bus routes involving Shenzhen-Shanwei Special Cooperative Zone
Abolished prefixes
English	Established year	Abolished year	Definition
G	1999	2020	Public routes which link the city and Shenzhen Convention and Exhibition Center during China Hi-Tech Fair
J	2005	2017	J is the first letter of "Jiéyùn", the pinyin of the Chinese word "**捷运**" meaning "Express service"
K	2009	2018	K is the first letter of "**Kuài**", the pinyin of the Chinese character "**快**" meaning "Fast" or "Express"
N	2005	2023	Nightly routes
Airport	2004	2017	**Former** airport routes which link the city and the airport
Futian FTZ		2018	Shuttle bus routes in Futian Free Trade Zone
Nanshan Loop Line	2016	2017	Loop bus routes of Nanshan District
Shen-Guan		2021	Inter-city bus routes between Shenzhen and Dongguan
Sightseeing	1998	2017	**Former** Sightseeing bus routes using double decker buses
Travelling	2018	2023	Travelling routes operated by non-franchise operators
Universiade Sightseeing	2010	2011	Sightseeing routes which operates during the 2011 Summer Universiade

There are also Inter-city bus routes from neighboring cities using their numbering systems. Please check their lists for details.

=== Notes for route number display ===
Formats	Definition
**Bold**	Routes in normal operation
**Bold & Italics**	Routes which will be cancelled or renamed soon
Italics	Routes which will be in operation soon

Note that temporary route changes may be implemented without notice here, due to existed road constructions or COVID-19 pandemic restrictions.

== Express Routes ==
Route		Terminus			Via
Current	Former	Terminus			Via
E1		Qinghu Industrial Park	↔	Shopping Park	Fulong Road, Xiangmihu Road,
E3	高快30	Zhenmei	↔	Yueliangwan	
E5		Longgang Inter-city Bus Station	↔	CR City	,,
E6		Tongle	↔	Futian Transportation Hub	,, Fulong Road, Xiangmihu Road,
E7		Longgang Yiwu	↔	Shenzhen North Railway Station Transportation Hub	
E8	356→E24→M240 (Express)	Xixiang Dachan Bay	↔	Caopu Metro Station	Via
E9		Dalang Sanlian	↔	Science & Technology Park	Liuxian Boulevard
E10	高快95	Fucheng'ao	↔	Shopping Park	,
E11	360	Xinda	↔	Shenzhen North Railway Station Transportation Hub	,
E12		Fashion City	↔	Lixiu Cultural St.	Fulong Road,
E13	K538	Shanmen Depot	↔	Shenzhen railway station	,
E15		Yu'an W.	↔	Guangming Park of Science & Technology	,
E16		Guanlan Inter-city Bus Station	↔	Bao'an International Airport Depot	
E17	高快5	Shenzhen Railway Station	↔	Jinniu E. General Depot	, Pingyan Express
E18		Shiyan Inter-city Bus Station	↔	Futian Railway Station	Fulong Road,
E19		Gongming Mashantou	↔	Shenzhen Bay Checkpoint	
E22		Kengzi Base	↔	Shenzhen North Railway Station Transportation Hub	,
E23	K651	Longgang Yiwu	↔	Zhongwucun	
E25	353 (N. section)	Pingdi Inter-city Bus Station	↔	Shopping Park	,,
E26		Dapeng	↔	Huaqiang Rd. Metro Feeder Station	,
E27	高峰44	Bantian Wuhe	↔	Manjinghua	
E33	868	Kengzi Base	↔	Fuyong Tangwei Community	,,
E34	868 (Interval 1)	Kengzi Base	↔	Yangtai Hill	
E36	794	Gongkenglang	↔	Shennan Beihuan Interchange	
E37	K384	Dalang Sanlian	↔	HKU Shenzhen Hospital	Fulong Road, Xiangmihu Road
E38	K318	Dalang Belle	↔	Shopping Park	Fulong Road, Xiangmihu Road
E39	高快24 高快35	Loucun	↔	Eco-technology Park	
E40	高快10	Gongkenglang	↔	Shennan Beihuan Interchange	

== Main-line Routes ==
=== M102-M199 ===
Route		Terminus			Note
Current	Former	Terminus			Note
M102	202	Futian Transportation Hub	↔	Fairylake Botanical Garden	
M103	103 (W. Section)	Xiasha	↔	Changling E.	
M105	K105	Xiufeng Industrial Park	↔	Shekou Cruise Center	Via
M106	K204	Chiwan Port	↔	Jianshe Rd.	Via Guimiao Rd. Crossing, Shenzhen Bay Sports Center and Xiasha
M109	209	Vanke Cloud City	↔	Coastal City	
M112	302	Qinghu Industrial Park	↔	Shenzhen railway station	
M117	334 (Interval)→高峰7	Huahan Technology	↔	Shekou Square	
M120	B820	Xiasha	↔	The Paradiso	
M128	高峰80	Jinxiu Guanyuan	→	Qinghu Metro Station	
M130	B830 (Gen. I)	Taoxia Community	↔	Shenzhen North Railway Station Transportation Hub	
M131	631	Xin'an Area 72 Anlida Depot	↔	Bao'an Experiental School	
高峰3	32	Songping Hill	↔	Shuibei	
M133	K113	Changling E.	↔	Shekou	Via Liantang, Huangbeiling Metro Station and Mangrove
M135		Liguang Industrial Area	↔	Logan Jiuyufu Bus Depot	
M136	366 (Longgang section)	Kengzi Dawo	↔	Hongmian Rd. Depot	Inter-city route via Huizhou
M137	317	Bantian Xiangjiaotang	↔	Huaqiang Rd. Metro Feeder Station	Via Banyin Express
M138	385	Xiufeng	↔	Yefeng Rd. Crossing	
M139	839	Fafangcun	↔	E. Square of Shenzhen East railway station	Via
M140	B696; B840	Dongchang	↔	Jinyuan Building	
M145	高峰145	Shilong Bus Depot	↔	Shiyan Cultural Center	
M150	B810	Buji Mancheng	↔	Shanglilang	
M152	352	Qiankeng Xincun	↔	Shenzhen Railway Station	
M154	954	Shanxia	↔	E. Square of Shenzhen East Railway Station	
M156	336 (S. section)	Hepingli Garden	↔	Wenjindu Inter-city Bus Station	Via Banyin Express
M157	高峰157	Xixiang Dachan Bay	↔	Qianhai Corporation Zone	
M158	高峰156	Shipping Center	↔	Qianhaiwan Metro Station	
M159	639	Bogang Shengfangyuan	↔	Huaide Commerce City W.	
M171	高峰171	Guangming Baihuadong	↔	Guanlan Dafu Industrial Area	
M172	372	Fucheng'ao Park	↔	Futian Transportation Hub	
M176	B736; B796	Shenzhen University Hospital	↔	Qianhai Cooperation Zone	
M178	B933 (Gen. I); B978	Yanshan	↔	Gonghe General Depot	
M179		Jiuweicun	↺	Anle Industrial Zone	
M180	380B→M180 (NW. Section)	Shuitian New Energy Depot	↔	Buji Kangqiao	
M181	881	Higreen Farm Product Market	↔	Fenggang Tian'an Cyber Park	Inter-city route via Dongguan
M182	382	Guanlongcun	↔	Fairylake Botanical Garden	Via
M183	383	Nanwan Zhangshubucun	↔	CR City	
M184	782	Zhen'an Industry Park	↔	Fufeng Rd.	Inter-city route via Dongguan
M185		Mingliu Yinxiang	↔	Longgang Tian'an Cyber Park	Inter-city route via Dongguan
M186	B658	Changfeng Rd.	↔	Gongming Inter-city Bus Station E.	
M187		Excellence Azure Coast	↔	Shatian Metro Station	Inter-city route via Huizhou
M188	深莞1	Qinghu Metro Station	↔	Dongguan South Railway Station	Inter-city route via Dongguan
M189		Pingshan Tiantou	↔	Logan City	Inter-city route via Huizhou
M190	高快20	Liuyue Xincun	↔	Futian Railway Station	Via
M191	旅游1	Bao'an Inter-city Bus Center	↔	Dameisha	Via
M192	旅游2	World Food City	↔	Futian Railway Station	
M193	旅游3	Bijia Hill	↔	Yanchuancun	
M194	旅游4	Buji Kangqiao	↔	Xixiang Zhongwucun	
M196	B961 (Gen. I)	Zhongying St. Border Station	↔	Xiaomeisha Community Bus Terminus	
M197	797	Niuchengcun	↔	N. Gate to Nanhang Mingzhu Garden	
M198	363	Pinghu Renwucun	↔	Huangting Square	Via Banyin Express
M199	103 (E. Section)	Jianshe Rd.	↔	Rose Coast	Via

=== M200-M299 ===
Route		Terminus			Note
Current	Former	Terminus			Note
M200		Xixiang Hengsheng Hospital	↔	Science & Technology Park	
M202	302 (Longhua Interval)	Realord Villas	↔	Experimental School	
M203	361	Baoding	↔	Shenzhen Safari Park	Via
M205	205	Yantian N. General Depot	↔	Shenzhen Railway Station	
M206	626	Guolincun Depot	↔	Bao'an Experimental School	
M207	207	W. Square of Shenzhen North Railway Station	↔	East Holy Valley	
M208		Dakang Community	↔	Henggang Middle School	
M209	611	Bao'an Taohuayuan	↔	Nanshan Central District Checkpoint	
M210	609	Baocheng Area 3	↔	Huajia Industrial Park	
M211	637	Dalang Belle	↔	W. 2nd Gate to Foxconn	
M212	634	Jianshangcun	↔	Realord Villas	
M213	213	Futian Transportation Hub	↔	Caopu Metro Station	
M214	623	Meilong Rd.	↔	Dalang Baokun Industrial Area	
M215		Gongming Mashantou	↔	Science Park Metro Station	
M216	766 (Xitian Branch)	Lisonglang	↔	Changfeng Rd.	
M217	716A	Guangming Guangsheng Factory	↔	Shenzhen North Railway Station Transportation Hub	
M218		Gongming Mashantou	↔	Guangmingcheng Railway Station	
M219		Pingdi Niumianling	↔	Universiade New Town	
M220		Jiaoyuan	↔	Kuichong	
M222		Qinghua Rd.	↔	Shenzhen Metro Financial Technology Building	
M224		Gankeng	↔	Shopping Park	
M225		Liguang Industrial Area	↔	Shenzhen North Railway Station Transportation Hub	
M226		Xinxie Hill Community Park	↔	Changkengcun	
M227		World Food City	↺	Nanlingcun Committee	
M228		Pinghu railway station	↔	Baoli Industrial Area	
M229		Henggang Wanli	↔	Water Bay	
M230	983B	Zhangbei	↔	Tongle	
M231	989A	Dapeng	↔	Dongchong Lido	
M232	989B	Dapeng	↔	Xichong Xigongcun	
M233	711A	Shiyan Lake	↔	Nanwan Shatangbu	
M234	711B	European City E.	↔	Songgang Shanmen Industrial Area Depot	
M235		Luotian	↔	Bao'an Inter-city Bus Center	
M236		Fenghuang Hill Bus General Depot	↔	Taifeng Industrial Park	
M237		Datianyang Bus Depot	↔	Airport East Metro Station	
M238		Youmagang	↔	Huamei Industrial Park	
M239	309	Huiyuan Industrial Area	↔	W. Square of Shenzhen railway station	Via
M240	高峰27	Xixiang Dachan Bay	↔	Caopu Metro Station	Via
M241	高峰29 (Gen. I)	Bao'an Inter-city Bus Center	↔	Shekou Square	
M242	高峰37 (Gen. I); 618; 619	Songgang Yanluo	↔	Shenzhen Bay Checkpoint	
M244	661	Shilongzai Depot	↔	E. Square of Shenzhen East Railway Station	
M245	701	Baocheng Area 3	↔	Gushu Metro & Bus Feeder Station	
M246	702	Xixiang Hourui	↔	Nantou Xiaoguan	
M247	705	Gushucun	↺	Yu'an Crossing	Anti-clockwise service only
M248	710	Tantou	↔	Gongming Inter-city Bus Station E.	
M249	714	Xixiang Hourui	↔	CR City	
M250	716	Tianliao	↔	Yu'an W.	
M251	751	Fenghuang Hill Bus General Depot	↔	Fuyong Furniture St.	
M252	754	Fenghuang Hill Bus General Depot	↔	Homsone International Furniture City	
M253	755	Xinyu Rd. Zhuangcun	↔	Shasi Science & Technology Park	
M254	756	Fuqiao General Depot	↔	Shajing Tongfuyu Industrial Area	
M255	764	Tangxiachong Tongfuyu	↔	Jiangbian 3rd Industrial Area	
M256	765	Huamei Industrial Park	↔	Hongxing Neighborhood Committee	
M257	768	Zhulongtian Talents' Apartment	↔	Liaokeng Depot	
M258	770	Jiulongshan Garden	↔	Guanlan Dashuitian	
M259	777	Gushu Metro & Bus Feeder Station	↔	Dabao N.	
M260	783	Tantou W. General Depot	↔	Longqiaohua Industrial Park	
M261		SDG Swan Lake	↔	Fucheng'ao	
M262	799	Shiyan MSI	↔	Shum Yip Garden	
M263	971	Hedongcun Bus Depot	↔	Minle Metro Station	
M264	992	Pinghu China South City	↔	Hepingli Garden	
M265	910	China South City S.	↔	Cuifeng Haoyuan	
M266	938	Henggang Wanli	↔	Tongle Xiakeng	
M267	942	China South City N.	↔	Caopu Metro Station	
M269	945	China South City N.	↺	Longhua Market	
M270	951	Ping'an Boulevard	↔	Higreen	
M271	955	Jixia	↔	Minle Metro Station	
M272	958	Buji Mancheng	↔	Huawei Single Apartment N.	
M273	959	Xiufeng Industrial Area	↔	W. Square of Shenzhen East Railway Station	
M274	967	Dapeng	↔	Yangmeikeng	
M275	969	Hengling	↔	Homeway Forest	
M276	970	Longgang Kengweicun	↔	Universiade New Town	
M277	983	Biling	↔	Zhangbei	
M279	988	Kuichong	↔	Pingdi Liulian	
M280	990	Niumianling	↔	Water Bay	
M281	994	Xialilang	↔	Luogang	
M282	995	Minzhi Metro Station	↺	Bantian Wuhe	Bi-directional Loop
M283	998	Fucheng'ao Laocun Committee	↔	Caopu Metro Station	
M284	766	Xiashijia	↔	Fenghuang Hill Bus General Depot	
M285	771	Guanlan Ping'an Rd.	↔	Guanlan Dashuitian	
M286	B896 (Gen. I)	Yanshan	↔	Dongguan Chang'an Bus Depot	Inter-city route via Dongguan
M287	773	Guanlan Dafu Industrial Area	↔	Longhua Cultural Square Temporary Bus Depot	
M289	793	Guanlan Dashuitian	↔	Baigehucun	
M290		Swan Lake Bus Depot	↔	Shuangyong St. Metro Station	
M291		Yanshan	↔	Airport East Metro Station	
M292	B602 (Gen. II)	Zhangkengjing	↔	Yangmei Metro Station	
M293		Xiabeicun	↔	Pingshan Railway Station	
M294		Shenzhen Institute of Information Technology E.	↔	Jinniu E. General Depot	Via
M295		Kengzi Base	↔	E. Square of Shenzhen East Railway Station	Via
M296		Pingshan Shuizukeng	↔	Longgang Central Hospital	
M297		Longtian Community	↔	Maluan Hill Suburb Park	
M298		Zhongshanyuan N.	↔	Kexing Science Park	
M299		Shenzhen Bay Checkpoint	↔	Shenzhen North Railway Station Transportation Hub	

=== M300-M399 ===
Route		Terminus			Note
Current	Former	Terminus			Note
M300		Pinghu Renwucun	↔	Shenzhen North Railway Station Transportation Hub	
M301		Fashion Dalang	↔	World Food City	
M302	796	Pinghu China South City	↔	Minle Metro & Bus Feeder Station	
M303	901	Universiade Metro Feeder Station	↔	Shui'an Xindu	
M304	903	Baolong Qingfeng	↺	Shengping Overpass	
M305	905	Baolong Qingfeng	↔	Fangxing Technology Park	
M306	984	Longxi	↔	Zhenye Tianluan	
M307	986	Longxi	↔	Water Bay	
M308	861	Baolong Nantong	↔	Pingdi 2nd Sub-district Office	
M309	832	Henggang 228 Industrial Area	↔	Zhangkengjing	
M310	863	Xinhe	↔	Longhua	
M311	960	E. Square of Shenzhen East Railway Station	↔	Ping'an Blvd.	
M312		Window of the World Metro Feeder Station	↔	Fengzehu Mountain Villa	
M313		N. Gate to Nanhang Mingzhu Garden	↔	Shahe E.	
M315		Universiade New Town	↔	Baolong	
M317		Universiade Metro Feeder Station	↔	Pingshan Railway Station	
M318		Universiade Metro Feeder Station	↔	Ping'an Boulevard	Inter-city route via Dongguan
M319		Longxi	↔	Universiade New Town	
M320		Longxin Community Workstation	↔	Universiade New Town	
M321		Dapeng	↔	Nan'ao Yangchou Bay	
M322		Universiade New Town	↔	Biling	
M324		Gankeng	↔	Zhonghai Dashandi Kindergarten	
M325		Pingshan Rainbow	↔	Jinniu E. General Depot	Inter-city route via Huizhou
M326		Xialiao Residential Community	↔	Baolong S.	
M327		Pingshan Jinxiu	↔	Kengzi Inter-city Bus Station	
M329	379	World Food City	↔	Mintian Rd. Terminal	
M330		Luotian	↔	Bao'an Taohuayuan	
M331		Shenzhen Waterlands	↔	Airport East Metro Station	
M332		Yanchuan Bus Depot	↔	Airport East Metro Station	
M333		Tantou W. General Depot	↔	The Foot of Fenghuang Hill	
M334		The Foot of Fenghuang Hill	↔	Airport East Metro Station	
M335		Yuefu Square	↔	Fenghuang Hill Bus General Depot	
M337		Gongming Underwear City	↔	Longhua	
M338	高峰107	Shiyan Inter-city Bus Station	↔	Xingdong Metro Station	
M339		Guanlan Dashuitian	↔	Qinghu Metro Station	
M340		Dalang Baokun Industrial Area	↔	Shenzhen North Railway Station Transportation Hub	
M341		Jincheng Wenfeng Bus Depot	↔	Shenzhen North Railway Station Transportation Hub	
M342		Mission Hills	↔	Minle Metro & Bus Feeder Station	
M344	B768	Zhangkengjing	↔	Guanlan Dafu Industrial Area	
M346		World Food City	↔	Minle Metro Station	
M347	76	Qianhai Hanghai Rd.	↔	Shenzhen North Railway Station Transportation Hub	
M348	238	Shenzhen Foreign Language School	↔	Tianbei	Via
M350	776	Unicenter	↔	Bao'an Education City	
M351	666	Jincheng Wenfeng	↔	Airport East Metro Station	
M352	622	Dalang Belle	↔	Shenzhen North Railway Station Transportation Hub	
M353	614	Dalang Sanlian	↔	Shenzhen North Railway Station Transportation Hub	
M354	658	Guanlan Inter-city Bus Station	↔	Shenzhen North Railway Station Transportation Hub	
M355	795	Shiyan Inter-city Bus Station	↔	Shahe E.	
M356		Tianliao	↔	7th Hospital Affiliated to SYSU	
M357	823	Henggang 228 Industrial Area	↔	Pingshan Railway Station	
M358	319	Baoding	↔	Zhongwu	Via
M359	865	Pingshan Railway Station	↔	Guanlan Dashuitian	
M360	855→M361 (W. Section)	Longhua	↔	Galaxy Smart	Inter-city route via Dongguan
M361	855→M361 (E. Section)	Kengzi Base	↔	China South City N.	Inter-city route via Dongguan
M362	E26 (Interval)	Kuichong	↔	Yewucun	Via
M363	高峰34	Xiufeng	↔	Shenzhen North Railway Station Transportation Hub	
M364		Yueliangwan	↔	Changling E.	Via
M365		W. Square of Shenzhen North Railway Station	↺	Shuidou Xincun	Bi-directional Loop
M370	机场4→E31	SDG Swan Lake	↔	Lower Henglangcun	
M372	高峰104; M372 (Gen. I SW. section); M516 (Gen. I)	Longteng Rd. Depot	↔	Lishan Industrial Park	
M373	386	Nanwan Danzhutoucun	↔	W. Square of Shenzhen railway station	
M375	396	Bao'an Inter-city Bus Center	↔	Yueliangwan Bus General Depot	
M376	628	Fuzhongfu	↔	Xin'an Area 67 Anshunda Depot	
M377	632	Liuxian 2nd Rd.	↔	Xixiang Hengsheng Hospital	
M378	616	Longhua	↔	Huangtian Inter-city Bus Station	
M379	662	Xixiang Dachan Bay	↔	Shawan Inter-city Bus Station	
M380	380B→M180 (SE. Section)	Buji Kangqiao	↔	Xiaomeisha	Via
M381	B831 (Gen. I)	Zhonghai Jincheng Garden	↺	Shangtang Metro Feeder Station	
M382	608	Liuxian 2nd Rd.	↔	Xixiang Hengsheng Hospital	
M383	335	Bantian Xuexiangcun	↔	Anfang Primary School	
M384	918	Kengzi Dawo	↔	Welld Electronics	
M385	K354	Ping'an Blvd.	↔	Xixiang Dachan Bay Terminals	
M386	831	Tongle	↔	Yuanshan Scenic Spot	
M387	机场5	Huamei Industrial Park	↔	Bao'an International Airport Depot	
M388		Shajing Galaxy Glory Bus Depot	↺	Yihua Electronics Town S.	
M390	15	Shixia S.	↔	Songde Garden	
M391	370 (S. section)	Longhua Qinghu Primary School Depot	↔	HKU Shenzhen Hospital	
M392	370 (N. section)	Xintian	↔	Futian Transportation Hub	
M393	E17 (Gen. I)	Fenghuang Smart Valley	↔	Shiyan Outer Ring Rd.	
M394		Henggang 228 Industrial Area	↔	Manjinghua	
M395	651	Shuitian New Energy Depot	↔	Dawang Hill	
M396	380A	Kengzi Inter-city Bus Station	↔	Henggang Central Primary School	
M397		Xinyu Rd. Zhuangcun	↔	Shajing Western Yiwu	
M398	245	Antuo Hill	↔	Bantian Internet E Times	
M399	211B	Xinping	↔	Jianshe Rd.	

=== M400-M499 ===
Route		Terminus			Note
Current	Former	Terminus			Note
M400	77	Gushu Metro & Bus Feeder Station	↔	Shekou Container Terminal	
M401	K302	Qinghu Industrial Park	↔	Shenzhen railway station	Via Shenzhen Gymnasium and Lizhi Park
M402	B307	World Food City	↔	Jianshe Rd.	Via Bulong Interchange, Buji Middle School and Dexing Garden
M403	K307	Jihua Baishaling	↔	Jianshe Rd.	
M404	300 (Interval)	World Food City	↔	Jianshe Rd.	Via Shawan Inter-city Bus Station, Zhangshubu Community and Dafen Oil Painting Village
M405	M201 (Interval)	Unitown Area 9	↔	Huafu Rd. Starting Station	
M406	371 (Interval)	Mocha Town	↔	Experimental School	
M407	300A	Xintian	↔	Jianshe Rd.	Via China South City, Shawan Inter-city Bus Station, Donghu Hotel and Department of Medical Care
M408	300B	Xintian	↔	Jianshe Rd.	Via Guanlan Inter-city Bus Station, Longhua Foxconn, Shenzhen East Railway Station and Honghu Park
M409	B601 (Gen. I); B602 (Gen. I)	Yueliangwan	↔	Shenzhen Bay Checkpoint	
M410		Gongming Mashantou	↔	Huiye Science & Technology Park	
M411		Gongming Underwear City	↔	7th Hospital Attached to SYSU	
M412		Jinlianxing Electronics	↺	Pinghu Square	Anti-clockwise service only
M413	310-315 (W. section)	Dawang Hill	↔	Futian Railway Station	Via
M414	310-315 (E. section)	Shangxue Science & Technology Park	↔	Buji Sunshine Garden	
M415	310-315 (N. section)	Shuitian New Energy Depot	↔	Nanwan Kangle	
M417	K359→E17 (Gen. II)	Shawan	↔	Futian Transportation Hub	Via Banyin Express
M418	B802	Yueliangwan	↔	Yongle Xincun	
M419	752→B787	Fenghuang Hill	↔	Hourui Metro Station	
M420		Fashion Dalang	↔	Jianshangcun	
M421		Longhua Cultural Square Temporary Bus Depot	↔	Nanwan Zhangshubu	
M423		Dapeng Center	↔	Dapeng National Geographical park	
M424	高峰47	W. 2nd Gate to Foxconn	↔	Baihuadong	
M426	B677	Pingshan Railway Station	↔	Baguang Xincun	
M427	B763	Pingshan Railway Station	↔	Skywell Auto Pingshan Base	
M428	821B	Qingqing Jiayuan	↔	Baigelong	
M430	31→B687 (Gen. I); B700	Yueliangwan	↔	Nanshan Central District	Via Lishan Industrial Park, Shekou Port Metro Station and Haiyue Metro Station
M434	916	Shatian Metro Station	↔	STU Middle School	
M435	301	Shajing	↔	Window of the World Metro Feeder Station	Via
M437	53→M207 (Gen. I)	Dameisha Wentan Rd. Depot	↔	Minle Metro Station	Via,
M439		Biling	↔	Biomedical Accelerator Factory	
M440		Pingshan Railway Station	↔	Pingshan Shuizukeng	
M441	B612 (Gen. I)	Futian Chekpoint	↔	Meishan Middle School	
M442	B639 (Gen. I)	Shilongzai Depot	↔	Yihua Electronics City	
M443	B674	Pingshan Railway Station	↔	Pingshan Foreign Language School	
M444	B734	Shatoujiao	↔	Yantian General Depot	
M445	B735	Hengpailing	↔	Huangbeiling Metro Station	
M446	B809	China Animation Industrial Park	↔	Universiade Metro Feeder Station	
M447	329 (E. section)	Jinlong	↔	Futian Transportation Hub	Express service Via
M448	329 (W. section)	Xiangjiaotang	↔	Chiwan	
M449		Longhua Cultural Square Temporary Bus Depot	↔	Liguang Industrial Area	
M450		Fashion Dalang	↔	Yinxing Industrial Park	
M451		Tianliao	↔	Guangming Grass Skiing Field	
M454	B686 (Gen. I); B799	Xiasha	↔	Yinhu Inter-city Bus Station	
M455	B721	Xiashijia	↔	MYS Group	
M456	B755; B869	Kuichong	↔	Dongbeicun	
M457	928	Kuichong	↔	Nuclear Power Plant	
M458	933	Longcheng Senior High School E.	↔	Biling	
M459		Xili Wangjingkeng	↔	Mintian Rd.	
M460		Yihua Industrial Area	↔	Experimental School	Via Fulong Road
M461		Bantian Wuhe	↺	Hushan Rd. Crossing	Bi-directional Loop
M462		Guangming Park of Science & Technology	↔	Shenzhen North Railway Station Transportation Hub	
M463	353 (S. section)	Xialilang	↔	Nanshan Inter-city Bus Station	Via
M464		Jinxiu Guanyuan	↔	Dongguan Vanke Tangyue	Inter-city route via Dongguan
M465	B703	Dameisha Wentan Rd. Depot	↔	Yantian N. General Depot	
M466	B871 (Gen. I); 905	Baolong Qingfeng	↔	Shantang Industrial Area	
M467	B727	Yueliangwan	↔	Nanshan Central District	Via Affiliated Middle School of SZU, Nanshan Party School and Chuangye Rd. E.
M468	B704 (Gen. I)	East Holy Valley	↺	Youyi Rd. Crossing	
M469	717→B832 (Gen. I)	Nantou Xiaoguan	↔	Gushu Metro & Bus Feeder Station	
M470	708→B833 (Gen. I)	Huangmabu	↔	Unicenter	
M471	966A→B756	Dapeng	↔	Nuclear Power Plant	
M472	728→B834 (Gen. I)	Tangkeng	↔	New Terminal of Bao'an International Airport	
M473	B632 (Gen. I); B633 (Gen. I)	Xixiang Hourui	↔	Bao'an Experimental School	
M474	B606 (Gen. I); B794	Taoyuancun	↔	Shenzhen Bay Checkpoint	
M475	93→B628; B793	Chaguang Rd.	↔	Nanshan Central District	
M476	高峰20	Futian Free Trade Zone	↔	Shawan	
M477	B647	Guanlan Niujiaolong	↔	Shenzhen North Railway Station Transportation Hub	Via Gemdale Mellon Town, Longhua People's Hospital and Qinghu Market
M478		Pingshan Railway Station	↔	Excellence Azure Coast	Inter-city route via Huizhou
M479		Pingshan Railway Station	↔	Chi'ao	Nightly service: NM479
M480		Pingshan Railway Station	↔	Biling	
M482	B705; B841	Ludancun	↔	Jinyuan Building	
M483	B699 (Gen. I)	Xixiang Dachan Bay	↔	Nanshan Central District	
M484	B702	Xixiang Dachan Bay	↔	Dongjiaotou	
M485	B822	Higreen Farm Product Market	↔	Caopu Metro Station	
M486	B603 (Gen. I); B610 (Gen. I)	Poetical Hill	↔	OCT Harbour	
M487	B681	European City	↔	Shahe E.	
M490		Guolincun Depot	↔	Songgang Metro Station	
M491		Higreen	↔	Galaxy Yabao	
M492	高峰63	Likang	↔	Qianhai Cooperation Zone	
M493		Sea World Bus Feeder Station	↔	Keyuan S.	
M494		Jiangbiancun	↔	Xinhui Department Store	
M495		Tianliao	↔	Jiangbian 3rd Industrial Area	
M497	高峰88	Logan City	↔	Pingshan Railway Station	Inter-city route via Huizhou
M498		China South City Bus Terminal	↔	Danzhutou Metro Station	
M499	M390 (Interval)→高峰53	Futian Checkpoint	↔	Meilin Yicun	

=== M500-M597 ===
Route		Terminus			Note
Current	Former	Terminus			Note
M500	76 (Interval)	Antuo Hill Depot	↔	Jianshangcun	
M501	B745; B746	Longxi	↺	Longcheng Middle School	Bi-directional Loop
M503	B645	Dalang Sanlian	↔	Shi'ao Road Depot	
M505	996→B815	Bantian Just Lifestyle	↔	Dalang Yangtai Hill Park	
M506	217→B813	Shenzhen Bay Checkpoint	↔	Zhongshanyuan Depot	
M507	98→B688	Xixiang Dachan Bay	↔	Shenzhen Bay Checkpoint	
M508	306 (Interval)	Shanglilang Technology Park	↔	Shenzhen Railway Station	Via
M509	B916	Fu'an Yayuan	↔	Qinghu Metro Station	
M510	高峰81	Guanlan Mingyu Huayuan	↔	Qinghu Metro Station	
M511		Xixiang Hourui	↔	Lezhujiaocun	
M512	762→B790	Huamei Industrial Park	↔	Bitou Industrial Area Culture Square	
M513	763→B791	Tantou W. General Depot	↔	Tangxiachong Tongfuyu	
M514	B634 (Gen. I)	Fuyong Qiaotou General Depot	↔	Hualun Science & Technology Park	
M515	753→B788	Fuyong Sanitation Inspection Department	↔	Fuying 2nd Industrial Area	
M516	B715	Luowuwei	↔	Bujiuwo	
M517	B731	Hengkengwei	↔	Longhua Cultural Square Temporary Bus Depot	
M518	227→B623	Dabao N.	↔	Shenzhen West railway station	
M519	J1 (W. section); 121; B609	Sea World Bus Feeder Station	↔	Wongtee Plaza	Via
M520	J1 (E. section)	Dameisha Wentan Rd. Depot	↔	Futian Transportation Hub	Via,
M521	高峰23 (Gen. I)	Baishilong Metro Station	↔	Bantian Internet E Times	
M522		Xixiang Hourui	↔	Xin'an Culture & Sports Center	
M524	B903	Bantian Xiangjiaotang	↺	Bantian Campus of Shenzhen Experimental School	
M525		Changfeng Rd.	↔	Bantian Xiangjiaotang	
M526	机场6	Fenghuang	↔	Fairylake Botanical Garden	Via
M527	机场10	Huangtian Inter-city Bus Station	↔	Sea World Bus Feeder Station	
M528	机场8	New Terminal of Bao'an International Airport	↔	Shenzhen Bay Checkpoint	Via
M529	B719	Changfeng Rd.	↔	Xiacun Park	
M530	高峰30	Fenghuang Hill Bus General Depot	↔	Shahe E.	
M531	E10 (Gen. I)	Yanluo	↔	Science & Technology Park	Via
M532	B722	Guangming Baihuadong	↔	Guolincun Depot	
M534	B646	Guanlan No.1 Industrial Area	↔	Shi'ao Reservoir	
M535	392 (Interval); B644	Liaokeng Depot	↔	Window of the World Metro Feeder Station	
M537	730→B690	Shangtang Bus & Metro Feeder Station	↔	South China Logistics	
M538	B648	Guanlan Niujiaolong	↔	Bujiuwo	
M539	39→B839 (Gen. I)	Nanshan Central District	↔	TCL International E-City	
M540	B922	Longhua Cultural Square Temporary Bus Depot	↔	Shi'ao Rd. Depot	
M541		Buji Xiliang	↔	Licheng Xiyueshan	
M543	726→B693	Kaisa City	↔	Shilong	
M544	B649	Liguang Industrial Area	↔	Top Mansion	
M545	B650	Guanlan Niujiaolong	↔	Jiulongshan Garden	
M546	812 (N. section)	Biling	↺	Biling	Bi-directional Loop
M547	812 (S. section)	Universiade Metro Feeder Station	↔	Minle P+R Bus Feeder Station	
M548	668	Fuyong Qiaotou General Depot	↔	Longhua Inter-city Bus Station	
M549	B659	Gongming Mashantou	↺	Guangming Hospital	
M551	B643; B780	Shiyan Inter-city Bus Station	↔	Fashion Dalang	
M552	B713; B775	Yanshan	↔	Tantou W. General Depot	
M554	高峰94	Longhua Qinghu Primary School Depot	↔	Keyuan S.	Via Liuxian Boulevard
M555	65	Honey Lake	↔	East Holy Valley	
M556	B723	Longgang Mountain Citylife	↔	Sangtai Longyuefu Bus Depot	
M557	B732	Mission Hills	↔	Walsoon Fenghuimingting	
M558	高峰82 西湾公园2 西湾公园3	Fuyong Qiaotou General Depot	↔	Longhua Inter-city Bus Station	
M559	28; 59	Futian Transportation Hub	↔	Shawan	
M560	630	Tianliao	↔	Yu'an W.	
M561	B706 南山微循环2→M486 (Interval)→B911 (Gen. I)	Baishizhou Metro Station	↔	Fonda city	
M562	20→B682 (Gen. I) 高峰121	Gaoxin W.	↔	Shenzhen West Railway Station	
M563	B679	Bangyan Green Valley	↔	Henggang Wanli	
M564	965A→B764	Zhukeng Huangniyuan	↔	Tangkeng	
M565	936→B695	Gankeng	↺	Buji Middle School	Clockwise service only
M566	B666 (Gen. I)	Shenzhen North Railway Station Transportation Hub	↔	Guanlan Niujiaolong	Via Minle Metro Station, Wuhe Metro Station and Huawei
M567	B667 (Gen. I)	Shenzhen North Railway Station Transportation Hub	↔	Xintian Hutchison's	Via Zhangkeng, Shuidou Xincun and Huawei Single Apartment North
M568	B668 (Gen. I)	Vanke The Village	↔	Guanlan Niujiaolong	
M570	B750	Henggang Wanli	↔	Fukang Heng'an Rd. Crossing	
M571	B849	Wuma Hill Park	↔	Pingshan Xinhai City	
M572	B742 (Gen. I)	Shenzhen North Railway Station Transportation Hub	↔	Guanlan Niujiaolong	Via Yayuan Crossing, Vanke Great Mansion and Xiangjiaotang
M573	B743	China Science Valley	↺	Beiguang Industrial Area	Bi-directional Loop
M575	965B→B765	Yike Building	↔	Chi'ao	
M576	965C→B726	W. Gate of Swallow Lake International Convention & Exhibition Center	↔	Zhukeng	
M577	336 (N. section)	Shilong	↔	Minle Metro Station N. Bus Depot	
M578	993→B792	Zhangkengjing	↔	Longhua Inter-city Bus Station	
M579	高峰91 (Gen. I)	Fashion Dalang	↔	Shangmeilin	
M580	729→B692	Dalang Belle	↔	Mintang Rd. Depot	
M582	759	Tangkeng	↔	Tangtou Nangang Industrial Area	
M584		Guanfu Rd. Bus Depot	↔	Science Museum Metro Feeder Station	Via Banyin Express
M588	398 (SW. Section)	Baoding	↔	Shopping Park	
M589	398 (NE. Section)	Longgang Intercity Bus Terminus	↔	Shenzhen E. Station	Inter-city route via Dongguan
M590		New Terminal of Bao'an International Airport	↔	Airport Ferry Terminus	
M591		Qigang Hill Garden Depot	↔	Shenzhen Airport Depot	
M592		Ping'an Estate Depot	↔	Shenzhen Airport Depot	
M593		Institute of Internet Technology	↔	Longgang Inter-city Bus Station	
M595		Xinshe Residential Community	↔	Pingshan City Terminal	
M596		Galaxy Horizon	↔	Honghu	
M597		Shenzhen North Railway Station Transportation Hub	↔	Logan Jiuyufu Bus Depot	

== Branch Routes ==
=== B601-B699 ===
Route		Terminus			Note
Current	Former	Terminus			Note
B603		Bantian Xiangjiaotang	↔	Qinghu Metro Station	
B604		Bantian Xiangjiaotang	↔	Shangxue Industrial Park	
B605		Nanshan Central District	↔	Merchant Taohuayuan	
B606		Dalang Fashion Town	↔	Dalang Commercial Center S.	
B607		Sea World	↺	Peninsulapolis	
B608		CR City	↺	Songpingshan Rd. Crossing	Anti-clockwise service only
B610		Kexing Science Park	↔	Science & Technology Park	
B611		Futian Transportation Hub	↔	Liantangwei 1st Rd.	
B612		Shenye Shangcheng S.	↔	Municipal Court	
B613		South China Digital Valley Bus Depot	↔	Guangyayuan Metro Station	
B614		Yinhu Inter-city Bus Station	↺	Sanjiu Garden → Honggang Xicun	Clockwise service only
B615		Hualian City Business Center	↺	Xuefu Middle School	
B616		Nepstar Group	↺	Nepstar Group	Anti-clockwise service only
B619	B662 (Interval)	Shatoujiao Community Healthcare Center	↔	Zhongying St. Border Station	
B621	56; 244	East Holy Valley	↔	Xinxiu Metro Station	
B625		Luohu District Chinese Medicine Hospital	↺	Liannan Primary School	
B630		Xixiang Metro Station	↺	Fenghuang Smart Valley	Clockwise service only
B631		Xingdong Metro Station	↺	Feiyang Science Park	Clockwise service only
B632		Tangwei Metro Station	↺	Tangwei Area 8	Clockwise service only
B633		Pingzhou Xincun	↔	Lequn Community	
B634		Sanwei N. Rd.	↺	Huafeng Industrial Area	
B635		Fuyong Metro Station	↺	Fuyong Traffic Police Station	Clockwise service only
B638		Tanglang Metro Station	↺	Baoneng City Bus Depot	Clockwise service only
B639		Xingdong Metro Station	↺	Antongda Industrial Area	Clockwise service only
B641		Bihaiwan Metro Station	↺	Xixiang Inter-city Bus Station	Clockwise service only
B660		Tangkeng Metro Station	↔	Tiansong Yayuan	
B661		Qiaocheng N. Metro Station	↺	Qiaochengfang E.	Clockwise service only
B665		Qiaocheng E. Metro Station	↺	Shennan Circuit Building	Clockwise service only
B666		Meilin Cultural & Sports Center	↔	Tagen Tianjiao Nanyuan Bus Depot	
B667		Liuxiandong Metro Station	↺	Yuncheng Boyu	Clockwise service only
B668		Shenzhen University Metro Station	↺	Hanking Center	Clockwise service only Terminus exchange by AM/PM
B669		Excellence Houhai Center	↺	Coastal Building	One-way Loop only
B670		Longdong	↔	Qingfeng	
B671		Pindi Tongxing Factory	↔	Penglianjia Science & Technology Park	
B673		Niumianling	↔	Gaoqiaocun	
B675		Xiabeicun	↔	Welld Electronics	
B676		Yantian Rd. Metro Station	↔	Jiachangyuan Creative Park	
B678		Pingshan Xinhai City	↔	Baolong S.	
B680		Caopu Metro Station	↺	Xinyi Experimental Primary School	Clockwise service only
B683		Longhai Garden S.	↺	S. Gate of Sunshine Palm Garden	Clockwise service only
B685	47	Futian Checkpoint	↔	Xiasha Primary School	
B686		Chuanghui International Center	↺	Chuanghui International Center	Clockwise service only
B687		Zhiheng Industrial Park	↺	Fanshen Metro Station	Clockwise service only
B698		Dongchang	↺	Caopu Metro Station	Anti-clockwise service only
B699	243→B624	Wutong Mountain	↺	Shawan Rd. N.	Anti-clockwise on SE. loop and clockwise on NW. loop only

=== B708-B789 ===
Route		Terminus			Note
Current	Former	Terminus			Note
B708		Chaguang Rd.	↺	Xili Market	Anti-clockwise service only
B709		Shum Yip Garden	↔	Shatou Sub-district Office	
B716		Pingdi Fafang	↔	Huanping Longding Rd. Crossing	
B720		Xiashijia	↔	Shangcun Liantang	
B728		W. Gate to Shenzhen University	↺	South Area Dormitory of Shenzhen University	Clockwise service only
B729		Shenyuncun	↺	Municipal Economic Crime Investigation Bureau	Clockwise service only
B737		Shenzhen Bay Checkpoint	↔	Shekou Square	
B739		Matangcun	↔	Shangshecun	
B741		Buji Mancheng	↔	Baigelong	
B742		Shenyun Metro Station	↔	Cultural & Sports Park	
B757		Henggang Railway Depot	↔	Liuyue Metro Station	
B760		Vanke Eastern Metropolis	↔	Huangzhukengcun	
B761		Dawo Jiabao Technology Park	↔	Biomedical Accelerator Factory	
B769		Hengkengwei	↔	Fuan Yayuan	
B789	758	Shajing Tongfuyu Industrial Area	↔	Dawang Hill Park	

=== B811-B899 ===
Route		Terminus			Note
Current	Former	Terminus			Note
B817		Shenzhen Bay Checkpoint	↔	Merchant Taohuayuan	
B818		Tanglang Metro Station	↔	Xili Dormitory of Shenzhen University	
B821		Shangmeilin	↺	Xiameilin Culture & Sports Park → Meidong 5th Rd.	Clockwise service only
B827		Gushucun	↔	Bao'an Education City	
B831		Fucheng Wanda Plaza	↺	Lingzhi Metro Station	Clockwise service only
B832		Baocheng Area 3	↔	Lingzhi Metro Station	
B833		Yangxia 4th Rd.	↔	Shajing Galaxy Glory Depot	
B834		Bao'an Inter-city Bus Station	↔	W. Gate to Tiegang Reservoir	
B836		Hourui	↺	Zhongwu Community	Clockwise service only
B837		Unicenter	↺	Qianhai Platinum Apartment	
B838		Rentian	↔	Wanfu Square E.	
B855		Xili Guanlongcun	↔	W. Campus of Shenzhen Polytechnic	
B864		COFCO Splendid City	↺	Fenghuanggangcun	
B869		University Town Shuttle Bus Station	↺	University Town Shuttle Bus Station	Private route
B870		Cultural Industry Expo Center	↔	Luohu Investment Building	
B871		3rd Senior Middle School	↺	PE & Sports School N.	Clockwise service only
B872		Longgang Inter-city Bus Station	↔	Homeway Forest	
B873		Longgang Inter-city Bus Station	↔	Longxi Wulian Rd.	
B874		Sangtai Longyuefu Bus Depot	↔	Longyuan Rd. Crossing	
B875		Fuyong Sanitation Inspection Department	↔	Xingweicun Committee	
B876		Fuyong Sanitation Inspection Department	↔	Tangwei Community	
B877		Xintian	↔	Mission Hills Metro Station	
B878		China South City Trading Center	↔	Mission Hills	
B880		Guanlan Repair Works	↔	Miaoxi Xincun	
B881		Nanlong Community Workstation	↔	Shaxi Bridge	
B882		Shaxi Bridge	↺	Danzhutou Metro Station	Clockwise service only
B883		Shajing	↔	Tangwei Metro Station	
B886		Yicheng Center Garden	↺	Shangfen Metro Station	Bi-directional loop
B888		Gushu Metro & Bus Feeder Station	↔	Gushu Garden	
B890		1st Banshandao	↔	Xufei Garden	
B891		Nangang Industrial Area	↔	Shiyan Cultural Center	
B892		Hejing Industrial Area	↔	Qiaotou Metro Station	
B893		Rentian Community	↔	Fuhai W. Station	
B894		Four Seasons Sunshine	↺	Daweicun	Clockwise service only
B896		Baigelong Metro Station	↺	Longshan Industrial Park	Anti-clockwise service only
B898		Danzhutou Metro Station	↔	Lychee Garden	
B899		Lisonglang	↔	Gongming Center Transfer Station	

=== B900-B992 ===
Route		Terminus			Note
Current	Former	Terminus			Note
B900		Jiangbiancun	↺	Songgang People's Hospital	Clockwise service only
B903		Nanwan Kangle	↔	Licheng Xiyueshan	
B904		Baocheng Area 3	↔	Xin'an Cultural & Sports Center	
B906		Dalang Baokun Industrial Area	↔	Yangtai Mountain E. Metro Station	
B908		Yangtai Mountain Greenway	↔	Huasheng Longyue Garden	
B912		BYD School	↺	Zhenye Luanshangu	Clockwise service only
B913		BYD School	↺	Zhenye Tianluan	Anti-clockwise service only Peak-time only
B915		Shangtang Metro & Bus Feeder Station	↔	Donghuan Rainbow	
B916		Tiansong Yayuan	↺	Kangle Garden Kindergarten	Clockwise service only
B917		Zhongmei Rd. Bus Depot	↺	Qianlong School	Bi-directional Loop
B918		Fu'an Yayuan	↔	Jinxiu Science Park	
B920		Dalang Sanlian	↺	Qinghu Metro Station	Clockwise service only
B921		Guanfu Rd. Bus Depot	↔	Hengkengwei	
B922		Baolong S.	↔	China General Nuclear Power Corporation	
B923		Pingshan Central Park	↺	Dadongcheng	Clockwise service only
B925		Yantian General Depot	↔	Yantian Seafood St.	
B926		Yuefu Square	↔	Yulü	Via Tangjia Community and Changzhen Market
B927		Yantian E.	↺	Dapeng Customs	Clockwise service on S. loop only
B928		Hourui Metro Station	↔	Bao'an International Airport Depot	
B929		Fuyong Metro Station	↔	Royal Mansion	
B930		Shangbu Pier	↔	Hongling Shirble	
B931		Pingshan Jinlong	↔	Pingshan Electronics Town	
B932		Fucheng Wanda Plaza	↔	Bao'an Children's Palace	
B933		Yanshan	↔	Songgang Metro Transfer Station	
B934		Shiyan Tongfuyu Industrial Area Loop Bus Depot	↔	Shiyan Cultural Center	
B935		Jinniu E. General Depot	↔	Pingshan District Government	
B936		Shiyueli Yaju Bus Depot	↔	Jincheng Wenfeng Building	
B937		Hongtian Community	↔	Shajing Metro Station	
B938		Pingshan Jinxiu	↔	Longtian Rd. Crossing	
B940		Zhengdacheng Bus Depot	↔	Guangming Foreign Language School	
B941		Hongqiaotou	↺	Songgang No.1 Primary School	
B942		Yuefu Square	↔	Youmagang	
B943		Pingshan Railway Station	↔	S. Area of Zhuyuancun	
B944		Shabo Xincun	↺	Dorm Area of BYD	Clockwise service only
B946	B945 (Clockwise Loop)	Chiwan Metro Station	↺	Chiwan School	Clockwise service only
B947		Zhengdacheng Bus Depot	↔	Watch Base	
B948		Waterland Resort	↔	Shajing Tianyuanju	
B949		Huaqiang Creative Park	↔	Guangming St. Metro Station	
B950		Kengzi Inter-city Bus Station	↔	Jinhui Rd.	
B954		Nanling	↔	Huxi Xinglong Rd. Crossing	
B956	968B	Kuichong	↔	Guanhu	
B957		Shixia S.	↔	Futian Checkpoint	
B959		Tianliao	↔	Changzhen Metro Station	
B960		Tianhuicheng	↔	Huaqiang Creativity Park	
B961		Kengzi Base	↺	N. Gate of Julong Hill	Clockwise service only
B962		Gate 3 to Futian Free Trade Zone	↺	Lenovo	Clockwise service only
B963		Galaxy Horizon	↔	Jingkou Xincun	
B964		Shenzhen Bay Sports Center	↺	Base of Software Industry	
B965		Zhongwu S. Metro Station	↺	Hezhou School	
B967		Guangming Park of Science & Technology	↔	Fenghuang Town Metro Station	
B968		Qiaocheng E.	↺	Shenhang Building	Clockwise service only
B969		Kuichong	↔	Baguang Xincun	Via Kuichong Central Primary School, Kuixing Apartments and Kuichong No.2 Primary School
B970		Kuichong	↔	Baguang Xincun	Via Kuichong Benkang, Kuixing Market and Kuichong Post Office
B971		Yuefu square	↔	Yulü	Via Fenghuang Yinghuicheng and Changzhen Xincun
B974		Galaxy Plaza Block A	↺	Yabao Primary School	Anti-clockwise service only
B976		Kenong Tongguan Rd. Crossing	↺	Chuangtou Guanguang Rd. Crossing	
B977		Fenghuang Town Metro Station S.	↺	Chaofeng Guangqiao Rd. Crossing	
B978		Gongming Square Metro Station	↺	Yibo Building	Clockwise service only
B979		Changzhen Metro Station	↺	Changzhen Market	Clockwise service only
B980		Songgang Yanluo	↔	Songgang Metro Station	
B981		Xinyu Rd. Zhuangcun	↔	Songgang Rainbow	
B983		Dapeng	↔	Yunhai Villa	
B984		Songgang Tangxiachong General Depot	↔	Yanchuan Northern Industrial Park	
B985		Fuyong Qiaotou General Depot	↔	Fenghuang Primary School	
B986		Shilongzai Depot	↺	Shiyan Inter-city Bus Station	
M438		Kuichong	↔	Temporary Site of Phase III	
B989		Henggang 228 Industrial Area	↔	Fukeng N. Rd. Crossing	
B990		Qianhaiwan Metro Station	↺	Qianwan Metro Station N.	
B991		Yueliangwan	↺	Shipping Center	
B992		Harbor School	↺	Harbor Primary School	

== Routes of former numbering plan ==
=== 1-97 ===
Route	Terminus			Note
1	Buxin	↔	Shenzhen railway station	Nightly service: N7
2	Caopu Metro Station	↔	Beidou	
3	Shenzhen Reservoir	↔	Shopping Park	Nightly service: N3
4	Yinhu Inter-city Bus Station	↔	Science Museum	
5	Yinhu Inter-city Bus Station	↔	Beidou	
7	Fengze Lake Mountain Villa	↔	Songde Garden	
8	Liuyue Xincun	↔	W.Square of Shenzhen Railway Station	Via Shenzhen East Railway Station and Shenzhen Trade Union Federation
10	Huangpu Yayuan	↔	S. Gate to Donghu Park	
11	Ziweige	↔	Guomao	
12	Futian Farm Product Wholesale Market	↔	Shenzhen Railway Station	Via Liyuan Primary School, Municipal Committee of the CPC and Renmin Bridge
13	Ningshui Garden	↔	Shangbu Ferry	
14	Lianhua Hill	↔	Beidou	
17	Shenzhen Reservoir	↔	Shenzhen Railway Station	
18	Caopu Metro Station	↔	W.Square of Shenzhen Railway Station	
19	Taoyuancun	↔	Nanshan Central District	
21	Ziweige	↔	Tonglecun	
22	Chiwan Metro Station	↔	Tonglecun (Zhongshanyuan Depot)	
23	Ningshui Garden	↔	Fubin Xincun	
26	Taoyuancun	↔	Futian Checkpoint	
27	Caopu Metro Station	↔	Changling E.	
29	Caopu Xiawucun	↔	Binhe	
34	Xiasha	↔	Fengzehu Mountain Villa	
37	Yihua Industrial Area	↔	Sea World Bus Feeder Station	
38	Xiangmei N.	↔	Shenzhen Railway Station	
42	Yueliangwan	↔	Window of the World Metro Feeder Station	
43	Glorious City	↔	Window of the World Metro Feeder Station	Via Liuxian Boulevard
49	Xili Wangjingkeng	↔	Shahe E.	
52	Dongchang	↔	Futian Free Trade Zone	Via
57	Changling E.	↔	Qingshuihe	
58	Shenzhen West Railway Station	↔	Cuifeng Haoyuan	
58	Shenzhen West Railway Station	↔	Dongsheng School	Express service
60	Futian Free Trade Zone	↔	Longyueju	Nightly service: N9
61	Liuyue Xincun	↔	W.Square of Shenzhen Railway Station	Via Buji Middle School and Sungang Railway Station
62	Caopu Xiawucun	↔	Futian Free Trade Zone	
63	Honey Lake	↔	Caopu Xiawucun	Nightly service: N10
64	Huagang Xincun	↔	Futian Transportation Hub	
66	Xili Wangjingkeng	↔	Window of the World Metro Feeder Station	
67	Xili Wangjingkeng	↔	Songde Garden	
68	Shatoujiao	↔	Shenzhen Foreign Language School	
69	Yinhu Resort	↔	Changling E.	
71	Agriculture Science Center	↔	Bus Building	
72	Antuo Hill Depot	↔	Shekou Square	
73	Futian Transportation Hub	↔	W.Square of Shenzhen Railway Station	
74	Minzhi Mintang Rd.	↔	Sunny TDI	Via Liuxian Boulevard
75	Ludancun	↔	Longyueju	
81	Qianhai Hanghai Rd.	↔	Minle Metro & Bus Feeder Station	Via Liuxian Boulevard
82	Baigelong Bus Feeder Station	↔	Shenzhen Railway Station	
83	Jinzhou Garden	↔	Shenzhen Railway Station	
85	Yantian N.	↔	W. Square of Shenzhen East railway station	
90	Window of the World	↔	Shenzhen Bay Checkpoint	
97	Huangbeilingcun	↔	Shenzhen Railway Station	Nightly service: N18

=== 101-236 ===
Route	Terminus			Note
101	Shenzhen Safari Park	↔	Shenzhen Railway Station	
104	Shenzhen Safari Park	↔	Ningshui Garden	
111	Meilin Yicun	↔	Changling E.	
113	Changling E.	↔	Shekou	Via Dongmen Middle, Special Zone Daily Office and Window of the World
122	Chiwan Metro Station	↔	Shenzhen Institutes of Advanced Technologies of CAS	
201	Nantou	↔	Shangmeilin	
203	Dongchang	↔	Dongmen	
204	Chiwan Port	↔	Jianshe Rd.	Via Zhuzilin, Dachong and Municipal 6th Hospital; Nightly service:N4
211	Wutong Hill	↔	Jianshe Rd.	
215	Xiasha	↔	Shenzhen Railway Station	
216	Futian S.	↔	Futian Farm Product Wholesale Market	Nightly service: N12
218	Liantang Checkpoint	↔	Songde Garden	
220	Fairylake Botanical Garden	↔	Jianshe Rd.	
222	Window of the World	↔	E. Square of Shenzhen East railway station	Nightly service: N6
223	Nantou	↔	Ningshui Garden	
高峰225	Dongchang	↔	Huafu Rd. Feeder Station	
226	Chiwan	↔	Xili Lake	
229	Ningshui Garden	↔	Shenzhen West Railway Station	Via
234	Liyumen Metro Station	↔	Dachong	
236	Songping Hill	↔	Yinhu Inter-city Bus Station	

=== 303-395 ===
Route	Terminus			Note
303	Buji Sanlian	↔	Futian Transportation Hub	
306	Cuifeng Haoyuan	↔	Shenzhen Railway Station	Via
307	Lihu Garden	↔	Jianshe Rd.	
308	Buji Sanlian	↔	Dameisha Wentan Rd. Depot	Via
312	Niuhu	↔	Wenjindu Inter-city Bus Station	
316	Changfeng Rd.	↔	Wongtee Plaza	
320	Xixiang Hengsheng Hospital	↔	Shenye Shangcheng	
321	Xintian	↔	W. Square to Shenzhen Railway Station	
322	Pinghu China South City	↔	Futian Transportation Hub	
323	Luogang	↔	Xixiang Bus Terminus	
324	Shuiweicun Bus Depot	↔	Zhongshanyuan Depot	
325	Guangming Zhenmei	↔	Eco-technology Park	
326	Huaxiayuan	↔	Futian Railway Station	
328	Zhangkengjing	↔	Shekou Cruise Center	
M453	Bantian Just Lifestyle	↔	Wenjindu Inter-city Bus Station	
334	Bantian Xuexiangcun	↔	Science & Technology Park	
337	Shenzhen Waterlands	↔	Shenzhen Railway Station (337 Terminus)	Via,
338	Baishixia	↔	CR City	
339	Bantian Xuexiangcun	↔	Huahan Technology	
351	Funing	↔	Jianshe Rd.	Via
357	Zhangbei Industrial Area	↔	Science Museum Metro Station	Via
358	Funing	↔	Shatoujiao	
362	Songgang Tangxiachong General Depot	↔	Futian Checkpoint	Via,
366	Kengzi Dawo	↔	Futian Railway Station	Via,
369	Buji Sunny Garden	↔	Nantou Evergreen Resort	Via
371	Nanling Garden	↔	China Merchants Guoren Bus Depot	
376	Nanwan Zhangshubucun	↔	Reservoir	
377	Baigelong	↔	Futian Transportation Hub	
381	Buji Sanlian	↔	Luohu District Hospital of TCM	
392	Changfeng Rd.	↔	Window of the World Metro Feeder Station	
395	Jiuweicun	↔	Window of the World	

=== 603-791 ===
Route	Terminus			Note
603	Baocheng Area 3	↔	Huangmabu	
605	Baocheng Area 3	↔	Xin'an Area 67 Anshunda Depot	
606	Baocheng Area 3	↔	Pingluan Hill	
610	Dabao N. Bus Depot	↔	Bao'an Taohuayuan	
612	Longze Estate	↔	Zhonghai Jincheng Garden	
615	Jincheng Wenfeng Bus Depot	↔	Gaoxinqi Industrial Area	
620	Minle Metro Station	↔	Guanlan Niujiaolong	
621	Dalang Sanlian	↔	Vanke The Village	
624	Bantian Xuexiangcun	↔	Dalang Belle	
627	Qiankeng Laocun	↔	Liguangcun	
629	Xin'an Area 67 Anshunda Depot	↔	Emerald Sunshine Garden Bus Depot	Via
650	Jincheng Wenfeng Bus Depot	↔	The Foot of Fenghuang Hill	
652	Tantou W. General Depot	↔	Shenzhen Waterlands	
653	Xinyu Rd. Zhuangcun	↔	Dawang Hill Park	
655	Xinyu Rd. Zhuangcun	↔	Luotian Water Supply	
704	Bao'an Taohuayuan	↔	Nantou Xiaoguan	
707	Xin'an 6th Rd.	↔	Huangmabu	
718	Unicenter	↔	Xixiang Hengsheng Hospital	
720	Beigang	↔	Huaqiang Creativity Park	
767	Tangkeng	↔	Songbai Likang Crossing	
779	Jingshun Fuel Station	↔	Shenzhen Waterlands	
781	Xinyu Rd. Zhuangcun	↔	Jincheng Wenfeng Bus Depot	
789	Shiyan Jiakanghuibao	↔	Skyworth Industrial Park	
791	Shiyan Huangfengling	↔	Huike Industrial Park	

=== 802-982 ===
Route	Terminus			Note
802	Pingshan Chuangjing	↔	Hongmian Rd. Bus Depot	
810	Universiade New Town	↔	Homeway Forest	
811	Hengling	↔	Hongyuan Marketplace	
818	Dapeng Center	↔	Jiaoyuan	
822	Qingqing Jiayuan	↔	Buji Longshan	
833	Xinda	↔	Jiaoyuan	Via
836	Higreen Farm Product Market	↔	Dushucun	
862	Fafangcun	↔	Universiade New Town	
882	World Food City	↔	Longhua	
906	Jianyi	↔	Kangle Garden	
907	Henggang 228 Industrial Area	↔	Yuanshan Scenic Spot	
915	Vanke Eastern Metropolis	↔	Ruijing Tongyu Rd. Crossing	
923	Homeway Forest	↔	Changjiangpu Industrial Area	
M160	Universiade Metro Feeder Station	↔	Anliang Wucun	
M161	228 Industrial Area	↔	Caixun Industrial Park	
M162	Silian Tengchang Garden	↔	Dakang Futiancun	
937	Shenlang	↔	Xiliang	
939	Shuizukeng	↺	Shuizukeng	Bi-directional Loop
941	Pingshan Rainbow	↔	Zhukeng	
956	Xiliang	↔	Caopu Metro Station	
963	Pingshan Railway Station	↔	Baolong Qingfeng	
964	Baolong	↔	Chi'ao	
977	Fucheng'ao	↔	Tianbei	
978	Pingshan Railway Station	↔	Pingdi Tongxing Factory	
979	Fucheng'ao Park	↔	Higreen Farm Product Market	
980	Xialilang	↔	W. Square of Shenzhen East Railway Station	
982	Bantian Fengmen'ao	↔	Galaxy Yabao	

== Nightly routes ==
Route		Terminus			Note
Nightly	Daily	Terminus			Note
N4		Futian Railway Station	↔	Nanshan Central District	
N73	B737	Shenzhen Bay Checkpoint	↔	Shekou Square	
N90	90	Shenzhen Bay Checkpoint	↔	Window of the World	
A6	NA6	Guangming City Terminal	↔	New Terminal of Bao'an International Airport	
NM242	M242	Shenzhen Bay Checkpoint	↔	Bao'an Transit Center	

== Airport routes ==
Route	Terminus			Nightly Service	Via
NA2	Shenzhen North Railway Station	↔	New Terminal of Bao'an International Airport		
A3	Shenzhen Bay Checkpoint Bus Depot	↔	New Terminal of Bao'an International Airport	NA3	
A4	Longgang City Terminal	↔	New Terminal of Bao'an International Airport		
A5	Swallow Lake International Convention & Exhibition Center	↔	New Terminal of Bao'an International Airport		
A7	Shawan Bus Depot	↔	New Terminal of Bao'an International Airport		

== Peak-time Route series ==
=== Peak-time routes ===
Route	Terminus			Type	Note
M288	Longgang Tongxin	↔	Yantian Port W. Metro station	AM & PM	
高峰16	Longsheng Metro Station	→	Shenhang Building	AM	
高峰18	Buji Mancheng	→	Futian Transportation Hub	AM	
高峰18	Buji Mancheng	←	Futian Transportation Hub	PM	
高峰21	Longhua Xinqu Blvd.	↔	Hi-tech Park	AM & PM	
高峰22	Vanke The Village	→	Science & Technology Park	AM	
高峰22	Vanke The Village	←	Science & Technology Park	PM	
高峰23	Zhonghai Jincheng Garden	↔	Shopping Park	AM & PM	
高峰26	Xixiang Sanwei Ferry	↔	Taoyuancun	AM & PM	
高峰29	Liuyue Xincun	→	Futian Railway Station	AM	
高峰29	Liuyue Xincun	←	Futian Railway Station	PM	
高峰31	Buji Kangqiao	↔	Bao'an Taoyuanju	AM & PM	
高峰32	Xixiang Dachan Bay Terminals	→	CR City	AM	
高峰32	Xixiang Dachan Bay Terminals	←	CR City	PM	
高峰33	Fucheng'ao	↔	Liantang Checkpoint	AM & PM	
高峰34	Xuexiangcun	→	Innovation & Technology Center	AM	
高峰34	Xuexiangcun	←	Innovation & Technology Center	PM	
高峰36	Window of the World	↔	Shenzhen Safari Park	AM & PM	
高峰43	Guanlan Dashuitian	↔	Science & Technology Park	AM & PM	
高峰45	Longhua	↔	Dawang Hill	AM & PM	
高峰49	Longhui Garden	→	Shanghai Hotel W.	AM	Weekdays only
高峰49	Longhui Garden	←	Shanghai Hotel W.	PM	Weekdays only
高峰54	Shiyan Huangfengling	↔	Eco-technology Park	AM & PM	
高峰62	Nantou	↔	Futian Railway Station	AM & PM	
高峰66	Guanfu Rd. Bus Depot	↔	Zhujiang Guanlan Yujing	AM & PM	Inter-city route via Dongguan
高峰72	Xixiang Dachan Bay Terminal	→	Science & Technology Park	AM	
高峰72	Xixiang Dachan Bay Terminal	←	Science & Technology Park	PM	
高峰73	Jixia	→	Shenzhen Railway Station	AM	
高峰82	Beyond the Valley	→	Lehuai Experimental School	AM	
高峰82	Beyond the Valley	←	Lehuai Experimental School	PM	
高峰89	Danzhutou Metro Station	→	Qifeng Science & Technology Park	AM	
高峰89	Danzhutou Metro Station	←	Qifeng Science & Technology Park	PM	
高峰90	Universiade Metro Feeder Station	↔	Shenzhen Institute of Technology	PM	Express service Fridays only
高峰92	Xintian	→	Nanshan Central District	AM	
高峰92	Xintian	←	Nanshan Central District	PM	
高峰97	Pinghu Renwucun	→	Shenye Shangcheng	AM	
高峰97	Pinghu Renwucun	←	Shenye Shangcheng	PM	
高峰99	Nan'ao Xinda	→	Baguang Exhibition Hall	AM	
高峰99	Nan'ao Xinda	←	Baguang Exhibition Hall	PM	
高峰117	Huawei Base	↔	Huawei Lizhiyuan	AM	
高峰118	Cloud Park	↔	Huawei Lizhiyuan	AM	
高峰119	Minzhi Mintang Rd.	→	Stars Plaza	AM	
高峰119	Minzhi Mintang Rd.	←	Stars Plaza	PM	
高峰120	Shenzhen North Railway Station Transportation Hub	→	Shenzhen Bay Checkpoint	AM	
高峰120	Shenzhen North Railway Station Transportation Hub	←	Shenzhen Bay Checkpoint	PM	
高峰121	Xin'an Area 67 Anshunda Depot	↔	Emerald Sunshine Garden Bus Depot	AM & PM	
高峰123	Longgang Inter-city Bus Station	↔	Fenggang JD Smart Valley	AM & PM	Inter-city route via Dongguan
高峰124	Tangjia	↺	Tangjia	AM & PM	School days only
高峰125	Huawei Base	↔	E. Area of Huawei Lizhiyuan	AM	
高峰126	E. Area of Huawei Lizhiyuan	↺	Cloud Park	AM	
高峰127	Jixiang Yuefu	→	Shenzhen High School of Science, Longgang Campus	AM	School days only
高峰127	Jixiang Yuefu	←	Shenzhen High School of Science, Longgang Campus	PM	School days only
高峰128	Xili Lake Campus of Shenzhen University	↔	Shenzhen Metro Financial Technology Building	Regular	
高峰129	Huawei Lizhiyuan	↺	Huawei Base	PM	
高峰130	Cloud Park	↺	Bantian Cultural & Sports Center	PM	
高峰136	Baolong Qingfeng	↺	Zhenye Valley Town	AM & PM	School days only
高峰137	Staff Dormitory of Shenzhen North EMU Overhauling Station	→	Shenzhen North Railway Station Transportation Hub	AM & noon	Via Fulong Road
高峰137	Staff Dormitory of Shenzhen North EMU Overhauling Station	←	Shenzhen North Railway Station Transportation Hub	noon & PM	Via Fulong Road
高峰139	Zhongshanyuan Depot	→	Dachong	AM	
高峰139	Zhongshanyuan Depot	←	Dachong	PM	
高峰149	Zhengdacheng Bus Depot	↺	The 7th Hospital affiliated to Zhongshan University	AM & PM	
高峰150	Glorious City	→	Sunny TDI	AM	
高峰150	Glorious City	←	Sunny TDI	PM	
高峰155	Bioeasy	→	Xin'an Area 67 Anshunda Depot	AM	
高峰155	Bioeasy	←	Xin'an Area 67 Anshunda Depot	PM	
高峰157	Hedongcun Bus Depot	↔	Qiankeng Bus Depot	AM & PM	
高峰158	Pingzhou Metro Station	→	Science & Technology Park	AM	
高峰158	Pingzhou Metro Station	←	Science & Technology Park	PM	
高峰162	Hengkengwei	↔	Qiankeng	AM & PM	
高峰163	Baihua Square E.	→	Guangmingcheng	AM	School days only
高峰163	Baihua Square E.	←	Guangmingcheng	PM	School days only
高峰164	Bantian Wuhe	→	Shenzhen Experimental School, Bantian Campus	AM & PM	School days only
高峰164	Bantian Wuhe	←	Shenzhen Experimental School, Bantian Campus	PM	School days only
高峰165	Shiyan General Depot	→	Eco-technology Park	AM	
高峰165	Shiyan General Depot	←	Eco-technology Park	PM	
高峰166	Shiyan Cultural Center	→	Qiaoxiang Xiangshan W. Rd. Crossing	AM	
高峰166	Shiyan Cultural Center	←	Qiaoxiang Shenyun Rd. Crossing	PM	
高峰167	Guangguyuan	→	Tianliao	AM	Weekdays only
高峰167	Guangguyuan	←	Tianliao	PM	Weekdays only
高峰169	Jinri Xiangsha	↔	Jixiang Yuefu	AM & PM	
高峰172	Pingzhou Xincun	→	Bao'an People's Hospital	AM	
高峰172	Pingzhou Xincun	←	Bao'an People's Hospital	PM	
高峰175	Kengzi Dawo	→	Shabo Xincun	AM	
高峰175	Kengzi Dawo	←	Shabo Xincun	PM	
高峰176	Shajing Sub-district Office	↺	Guangming Experimental School	AM & PM	Anti-clockwise service only Schooldays only
高峰178	Yinxing Technology Park	↺	Songyuanxia Metro Station	AM & PM	Clockwise service only
高峰179	Luotian	→	Bao'an Inter-city Bus Center	AM	
高峰179	Luotian	←	Bao'an Inter-city Bus Center	PM	
高峰183	SDG Swan Lake	↔	Danzhutou Metro Station	AM & PM	
高峰184	Changzhen Welfare Apartment	→	Guangming Foreign Language School	AM	
高峰184	Changzhen Welfare Apartment	←	Guangming Foreign Language School	PM	
高峰185	Universiade New Town	↺	Longgang Central Hospital	AM	Anti-clockwise service only
高峰189	China Science Valley	↔	China South City Metro station	AM & PM	
高峰191	Huangbeiling	→	Guowei Rd. E.	AM	Schooldays only
高峰194	Fukeng N. Rd. Crossing	→	Yuanshan Experimental School	AM	Schooldays only
高峰194	Fukeng N. Rd. Crossing	←	Yuanshan Experimental School	PM	Schooldays only
高峰196	Kuichong	↔	Cheerland Biomed Center	AM & PM	Weekdays only
高峰199	Pingxi Rd. Crossing	→	Xianglin Century Mansion	AM	Schooldays only
高峰199	Pingxi Rd. Crossing	←	Xianglin Century Mansion	PM	Schooldays only
高峰201	Caopu Metro Station	→	Shangmeilin	AM & PM	
高峰201	Caopu Metro Station	←	Shangmeilin	PM	
高峰221	Qinghu Industrial Park	→	Futian Transportation Hub	AM	Via
高峰221	Qinghu Industrial Park	←	Futian Transportation Hub	PM	Via

=== Peak-time Express routes ===
Route	Terminus			Type	Via
高快6	Guangming Baihuadong	↔	Huaqiang Rd. Metro & Bus Feeder Station	AM & PM	
高快14	Longhua District Talent Park	↔	Futian Transportation Hub	AM & PM	, Fulong Road, Xiangmihu Road
高快16	Longyueju	↔	Futian Transportation Hub	AM & PM	and Fulong Road
高快17	Guanlan Ping'an Rd.	↔	Minle Metro & Bus Feeder Station	AM & PM	
高快27	Guanlan Mingyu Huayuan	↔	Shopping Park Metro Station	Regular	
高快28	Fashion Dalang	↔	Futian Railway Station	AM & PM	and Fulong Road
高快29	Fenghuang	↔	Yinhu Inter-city Bus Station	AM & PM	
高快31	Changfeng Rd.	↔	Convention & Exhibition Center Metro Station	AM & PM	Fulong Road
高快41	Bantian Xiangjiaotang	→	Software Industry Base	AM	
高快42	Bantian Wuhe	→	Sports Court of S. Area of SZU	AM	
高快42	Bantian Wuhe	←	Sports Court of S. Area of SZU	PM	
高快43	Xintian Huchison's	→	Sports Court of S. Area of SZU	AM	Liuxian Boulevard and
高快43	Xintian Huchison's	←	Sports Court of S. Area of SZU	PM	Liuxian Boulevard and
高快47	Xixiang Zhongwucun	→	Shanghai Hotel W.	AM	
高快47	Xixiang Zhongwucun	←	Shanghai Hotel W.	PM	
高快48	Buji Kangqiao	→	Software Industry Base	AM	
高快49	Huaxiayuan	→	European City E.	AM	
高快49	Huaxiayuan	←	European City E.	PM	
高快50	Shuitian New Energy Depot	→	Innovation & Technology Center	AM	
高快50	Shuitian New Energy Depot	←	Innovation & Technology Center	PM	
高快51	Shiyan Lake	→	Innovation & Technology Center	AM	
高快51	Shiyan Lake	←	Innovation & Technology Center	PM	
高快52	Shuitian New Energy Depot	→	European City E.	AM	
高快52	Shuitian New Energy Depot	←	European City E.	PM	
高快53	Buji Baoding	→	Innovation & Technology Center	AM	
高快53	Buji Baoding	←	Innovation & Technology Center	PM	
高快56	Longgang Inter-city Bus Station	↔	Hi-tech Park	AM & PM	
高快70	Shi'ao Waihuan Rd. Bus Depot	→	Futian Transportation Hub	AM	Fulong Road and Xiangmihu Road
高快70	Shi'ao Waihuan Rd. Bus Depot	←	Futian Transportation Hub	PM	Fulong Road and Xiangmihu Road
高快81	Bantian Xiangjiaotang	↺	Longgang Transport Bureau	AM & PM	
高快86	Buji Kangqiao	↔	Fenggang Inter-city Bus Station	AM & PM	Inter-city route via Dongguan

== Travelling Routes ==
=== Dapeng holiday routes ===
These are routes reaching or inside Dapeng New District, where tourism is one of the main industries. They are listed in order of Chinese Pinyin alphabet.

Route	Terminus			Via	Note
大鹏假日4	Futian Railway Station	↔	Xinda Tourist Center		Express service
大鹏假日6	Yantian Rd. Metro Station	↔	Xinda Tourist Center		Express service
大鹏接驳2	Xinda Tourist Center	↔	Yangmeikeng		
大鹏接驳3	Dapeng	↔	Dongchong Lido		
大鹏接驳4	Xinda Tourist Center	↔	Xichong 2nd Lido		
大鹏接驳6	Xinda Tourist Center	↔	National Geological Park		
大鹏接驳11	Dapeng Gas Station	↺	Nan'ao Yangchouwan		
大鹏接驳13	Kuichong	↺	Rose Coast		

=== Sightseeing routes ===
Route	Logo Color	Terminus			Note
Historical	Red	Lotus Hill	↺	Guomao	
Eco & Science	Blue	Window of the World	↺	OCT Harbour	
Nightscape	Yellow	OCT Harbour	↺	Guomao	
Greater Bay Area	Orange	Window of the World	↺	Bao'an Center Metro Station	
Eco & Humanities	Green	Gankeng Hakka town	↺	Guomao	
Port Feeder	Purple	Shenzhen Railway Station	↺	Shenzhen Railway Station	

=== Other holiday routes ===
These routes are listed in order of Pinyin alphabet, and mostly by Chinese names of their destination scenic spots.

Route	Terminus			Via	Note
旅游6	Interlaken Hotel	↔	Knight Valley		Operated by OCT Group Co, ltd
滨海休闲观光假日专线	Futian Transportation Hub	↔	Shekou Square		Weekends and holidays only
虹桥公园假日1	Galaxy Horizon	↔	Fenghuang Town Metro Station		Weekends and holidays only
光明假日1	Guangming Park of Science & Technology	↔	Guangming Town & Happy Field		Weekends and holidays only
莲花山公园巴士	SE. Gate of Lotus Hill Park	↺	SE. Gate of Lotus Hill Park		
青青世界公园接驳专线	Evergreen Resort Bus Feeder Station	↺	Evergreen Resort		
梧桐山假日2	E. Square of Shenzhen East Railway Station	↔	Wutong Hill		

== Routes involving Shenzhen-Shanwei Special Cooperative Zone ==
=== Regular routes ===
Route	Terminus			Note
深汕1	Shangbeicun	↔	Min'ancun	
深汕2	Shangbeicun	↔	Chishi Town Bus Depot	
深汕3	Houmen Railway Station	↔	China Resources Electrics	
深汕4	Xinxingcun	↔	Chishi Town Bus Depot	
深汕5	Shenshan Bus Depot	↔	Chishi Town Bus Depot	

=== Peak-time routes ===
Route	Terminus			Type	Note
深汕高峰31	Shangbeicun	↔	Hongluocun	AM & PM	
深汕高峰32	Ebu Central Primary School	↔	Southwest Village	AM & noon & PM	
深汕高峰33	Chishi Town Bus Depot	↔	Wanyaocun	AM & PM	
深汕高峰35	Chishi Town Bus Depot	↔	Shuikoucun	AM & noon & PM	Schooldays only
深汕高峰37	Chishi Town Bus Depot	↔	Xinlicun	AM & PM	Schooldays only
深汕高峰38	Min'ancun	↔	Bai'ancun	AM & noon & PM	
深汕高峰39	Chishi Town Bus Depot	→	Nanshan Foreign Language School, Shenshan	AM or PM	AM on schooldays and PM on weekends
深汕高峰39	Chishi Town Bus Depot	←	Nanshan Foreign Language School, Shenshan	PM	Schooldays only
深汕高峰40	Xiabeicun	→	Ebu Central Primary School	AM & noon	Schooldays only
深汕高峰40	Xiabeicun	←	Ebu Central Primary School	noon & PM	Schooldays only
深汕高峰41	Ruihe Industrial Park	↔	Brand Industrial Park	AM & PM	
深汕高峰42	Min'ancun	→	Nanshan Foreign Language School, Shenshan	AM or PM	AM on schooldays and PM on weekends
深汕高峰42	Min'ancun	←	Nanshan Foreign Language School, Shenshan	PM	Schooldays only
深汕高峰43	China Resources Electrics	↔	Shenzhen 2nd Senior High School, Shenshan	PM	Fridays & Sundays only
深汕高峰44	Houmen Railway Station	↔	Shenzhen 2nd Senior High School, Shenshan	PM	Fridays & Sundays only
深汕高峰45	Min'ancun	↔	Shenzhen 2nd Senior High School, Shenshan	PM	Fridays & Sundays only
深汕高峰46	Shangbeicun	↔	Shenzhen 2nd Senior High School, Shenshan	PM	Fridays & Sundays only
深汕高峰47	Chishi Town	↔	Shenzhen 2nd Senior High School, Shenshan	PM	Fridays & Sundays only

== Inter-city Routes ==
=== Dongguan bus routes to Shenzhen ===
Note that bus routes 216, 312, 781, 789 and 915 here belong to Dongguan Bus Co, ltd, not to be confused with routes of Shenzhen bus operators with the same numbers.

Route	Terminus			Note
Route	Main Terminal	↔	Sub Terminal	Note
209	Bitou Metro Station N.	↔	Dongguan E. Inter-city Bus Station	
216	Bitou Metro Station N.	↔	Humen Railway Station	
219	Bitou Metro Station N.	↔	Shangnan Rd. Depot	
241	Yanluo Bus Terminal	↔	Binhaiwan Bus Depot	
285	Bitou Metro Station N.	↔	Chang'an N. Inter-city Bus Station	
289	Chang'an Bus Terminal	↔	Vivo Industrial Area	Via Songgang Metro Station
312	Songgang Park Metro Station	↔	Shilong Passenger Terminal	
747	Guangming Transport Bureau	↔	Huangjiang Bus Station	
772	Niuhu Metro Station	↔	Tangxia Bus Station	
776	Niuhu Metro Station	↔	Fenggang Bus Station	
781	Silian Metro Station	↔	Fenggang Bus Station	
782	Huangge Cuiyuan	↔	Fenggang Bus Station	
786	Universiade Metro Feeder Station	↔	Fenggang Bus Station	
915	Pinghu Square W.	↔	Sanhesheng Factory	
高峰快线1	JD Smart Valley	↔	Danzhutou Metro Station	Rush hours only
高峰快线2	JD Smart Valley	↔	Shuangyong St. Metro Station	Rush hours only

=== Huizhou bus routes to Shenzhen ===
Route	Terminus			Operator
Route	Shenzhen Territory	↔	Huizhou Territory	Operator
深惠1	Temporary suspended			
深惠2	Shatian Metro Station	↔	Huiyang Inter-city Bus Station	
深惠4	Kuichong Center	↔	Dayawan Inter-city Bus Station	
138B	Tianxin Metro station	↔	Mei'an Qiting	Shun'an Transportation Co, ltd
163	Shatian Metro Station	↔	Fuyuxiang Factory	Huayuntong Transport Co, ltd
168B	Baishi Bo'en Factory	↔	Xiamen-Shenzhen Railway Huizhou S. Station	Yuantong Transportation Co, ltd
208	Longgang Inter-city Bus Station	↔	Huizhou railway station	Huizhou Dongjiang Public Transportation Co, ltd
266	Shatian Metro Station	↔	Taidong Tianyuewan, Country Garden	Dayawan Bus Co, ltd
268	Shatian Metro Station	↔	5 Kilometers Beach, Country Garden	Dayawan Bus Co, ltd
336	Delux Technology Co., Ltd.	↔	Xiamen-Shenzhen Railway Huizhou S. Station	
惠阳7	Shatian Metro Station	↔	Moling	Huiyang Bus Co, Ltd

=== Hong Kong bus routes to Shenzhen ===
Route	Terminus			Operator
Route	Shenzhen Territory	↔	Hong Kong Territory	Operator
B1	Futian Port; Huanggang Port (Lok Ma Chau station)	↔	Tin Tsz	The Kowloon Motor Bus Company Limited (KMB)
B1	Futian Port; Huanggang Port (Lok Ma Chau station)	↔	Ma Wang Road (Shan Shui House)	The Kowloon Motor Bus Company Limited (KMB)
B1	Futian Port; Huanggang Port (Lok Ma Chau station)	↔	Tin Yan Estate	The Kowloon Motor Bus Company Limited (KMB)
B2	Shenzhen Bay Port	↔	Yuen Long station	New Lantao Bus Company Limited (NLB)
B2P	Shenzhen Bay Port	↔	Tin Shui Wai (Tin Tsz Estate)	New Lantao Bus Company Limited (NLB)
B2X	Shenzhen Bay Port	↔	Tin Shui Wai (Tin Yiu Estate)	New Lantao Bus Company Limited (NLB)
B3	Shenzhen Bay Port	↔	Tuen Mun Ferry Pier	Citybus Limited (CTB), Hong Kong
B3A	Shenzhen Bay Port	↔	Shan King Estate (King Lok House)	Citybus Limited (CTB), Hong Kong
B3M	Temporary suspended			Citybus Limited (CTB), Hong Kong
B3X	Shenzhen Bay Port	↔	Tuen Mun Town Centre	Citybus Limited (CTB), Hong Kong
B7	Heung Yuen Wai Port	↔	Sheung Shui station	Citybus Limited (CTB), Hong Kong
B8	Heung Yuen Wai Port	↔	Tai Wai station	Citybus Limited (CTB), Hong Kong
B9	Heung Yuen Wai Port	↔	Tuen Mun station	The Kowloon Motor Bus Company Limited (KMB)

=== Shenzhen bus routes to neighboring cities ===
These routes have been already mentioned above with indications in the Note column: M136, M181, M184, M185, M187, M188, M189, M286, M318, M325, M360, M361, M464, M478, M497, M589, 高峰66, 高峰123 and 高快86. Please review for details.

== Customized routes ==
Please search these routes with apps named "E巴士"(operated by Shenzhen Eastern Bus) or "优点巴士"(operated by Shenzhen Bus Group).
