= OCT Harbour =

- 欢乐海岸
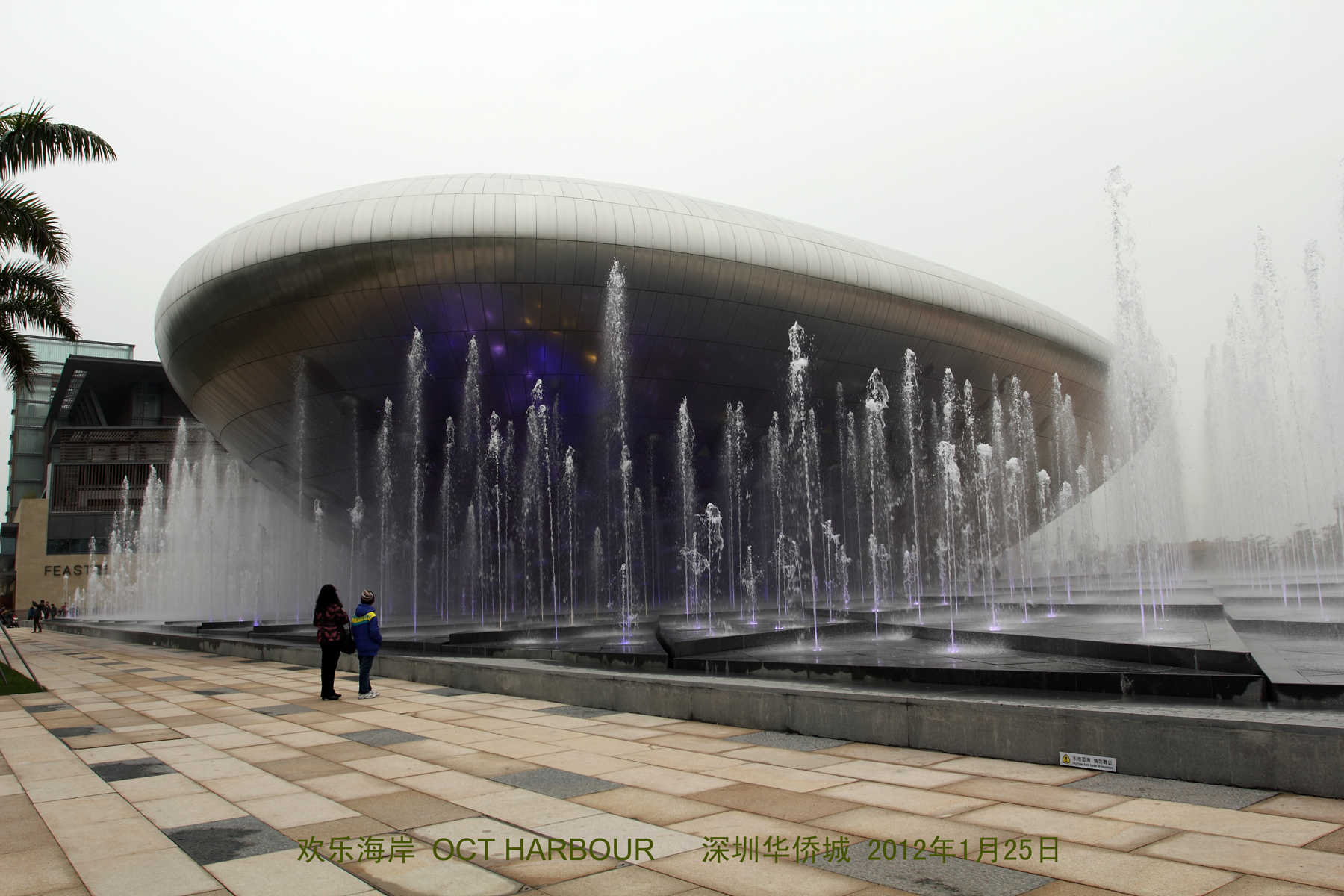
- Location: 8 Baishi Road, Nanshan, Shenzhen, China
- Opened: 2011
- Owner: Overseas Chinese Town Enterprises (100%)
- Website: http://www.octharbour.com/

OCT Harbour
- Simplified Chinese: 欢乐海岸
- Traditional Chinese: 歡樂海岸
Transcriptions
Standard Mandarin
- Hanyu Pinyin: Huānlè Hǎi'àn
Yue: Cantonese
- Jyutping: fun1 lok6 hoi2 ngon6

OCT Harbour (Chinese: 欢乐海岸), formerly known as OCT Bay and Happy Harbour, is a large retail and entertainment complex in Shenzhen, China. It covers an area of roughly 1.25 km^{2}. and features amongst others, a manmade lake and canals, hotels and a shopping mall. It was opened to the public in 2011.
