= Huizhounan Railway Station =

Railway station in Guangdong Province, China

Huizhounan Railway Station 惠州南站
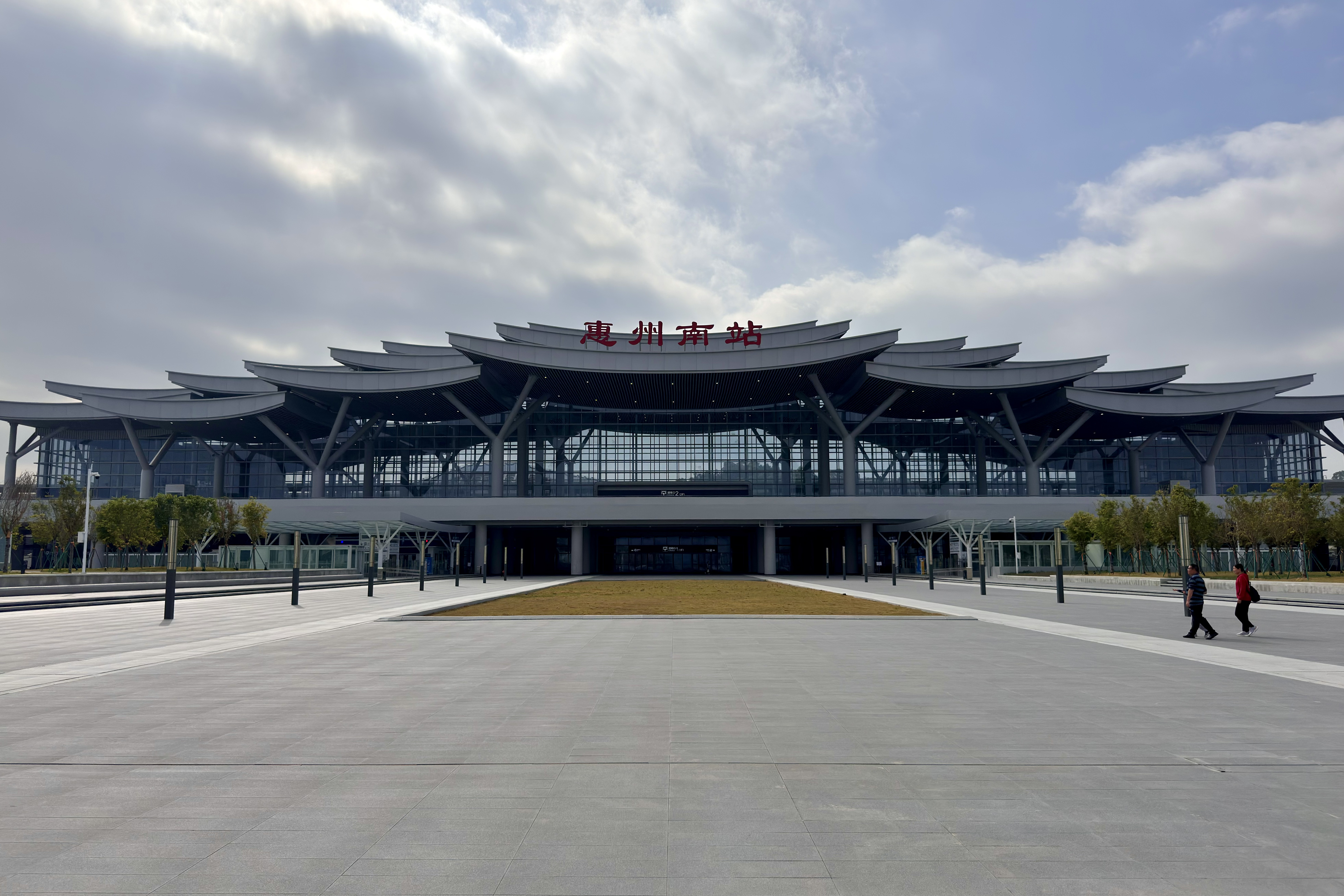

General information
- Location: Sandong, Huicheng District, Huizhou City; Guangdong; China
- Coordinates: 23.0546°N 114.4172°E
- Operator: China Railway Guangzhou Group; Guangshen Railway Company Limited Guangzhou Train Operation Section
- Lines: Guangzhou-Shanwei high-speed railway Shenzhen-Huizhou intercity railway (future development)
- Platforms: 2 island platforms
- Tracks: 6

Construction
- Structure type: Elevated

History
- Opened: September 26, 2023
Location
- Location within Guangdong

Huizhounan railway station (Chinese: 惠州南站; pinyin: Huìzhōu Nán zhàn) is a high-speed railway station located in Sandong Town, Huicheng, Huizhou City, Guangdong Province, China. It was officially opened on September 26, 2023.

== Building ==
The station features a "layered-tile" shaped roof placed over a transparent glass structure. Its roof is constructed from a matrix of 26 steel structural units, showcasing the traditional charm of Lingnan villages. The main station building consists of two floors, with parts extending to four floors, and has a total floor area of 29,997 square metres (322,890 sq ft). It has a maximum capacity of 1,500 people and adopts a side-line station design.

Station Floors

3F	Platform Level	Platforms 1–2 (Shantou direction), Platforms 3–4 (Xintang direction)
3F	Commercial	Reserved commercial space
2F	Entrance Hall	Waiting room, comprehensive service desk, mother-and-child room, restrooms, care waiting area, shops, business waiting area
1F	Entrance Hall	Waiting Room
1F	Ticket Office	Passenger Service Center
1F	Exit Hall	Exit hall, supplementary ticket counter, restrooms, transfers
1F	Station Plaza	Restrooms, police station
B1F	Integrated Transportation Hub	Bus station, taxi area, P5, P6 parking lots, ridesharing pickup area
B2F	Parking Lot	P1, P2 parking lots
B3F	Parking Lot	P3, P4 parking lots

== Gallery ==
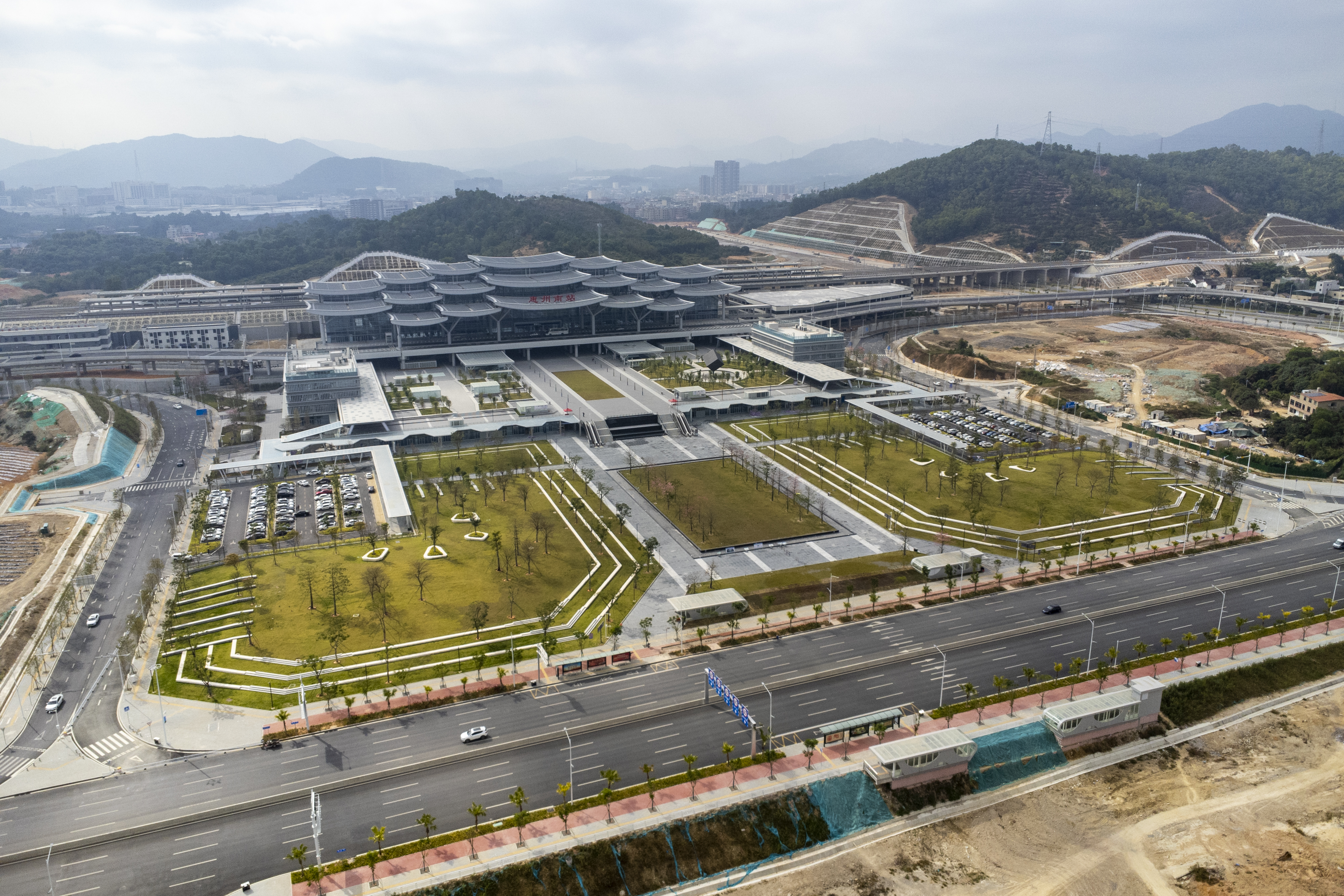
Aerial view of the station and station plaza

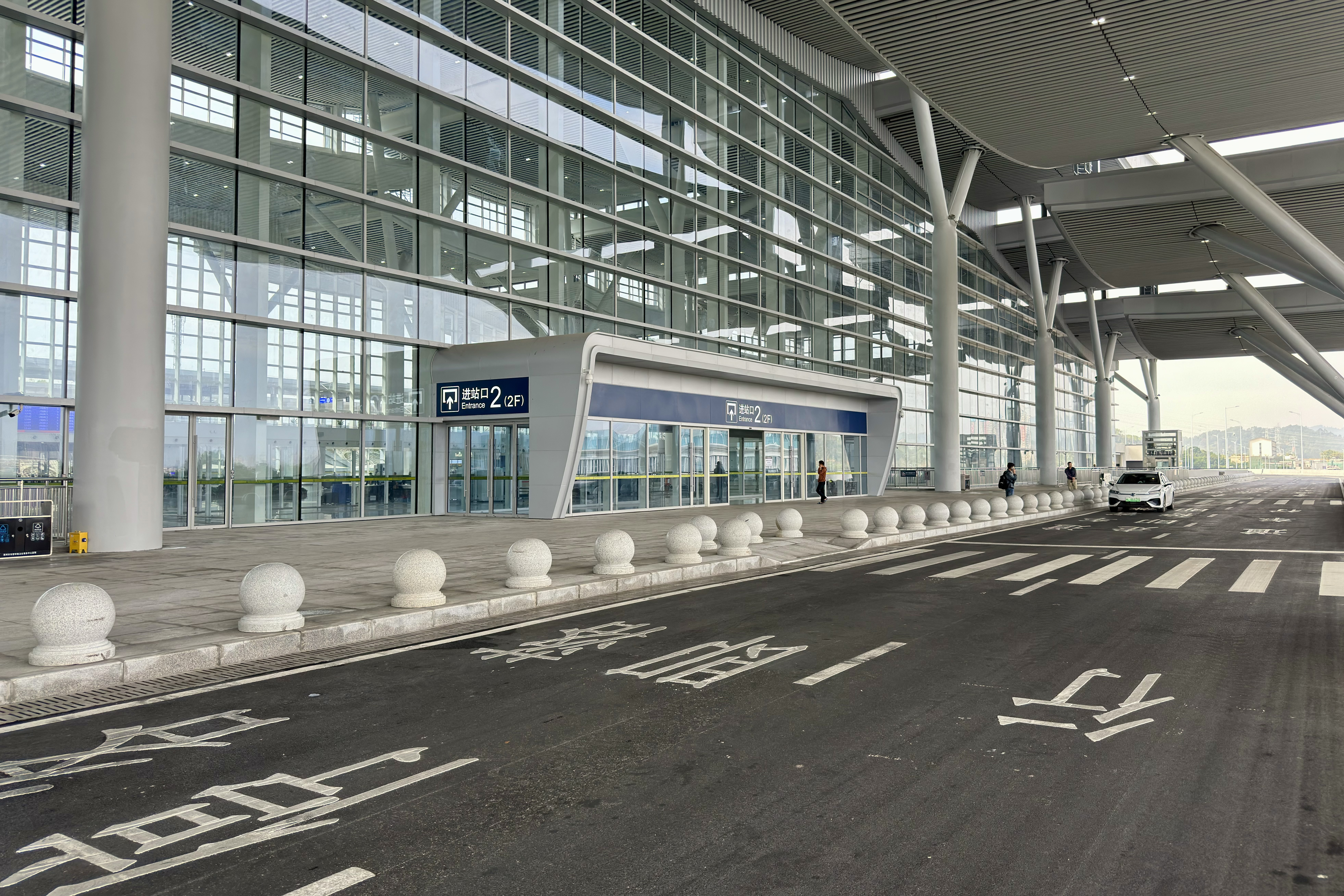
Entrance 2

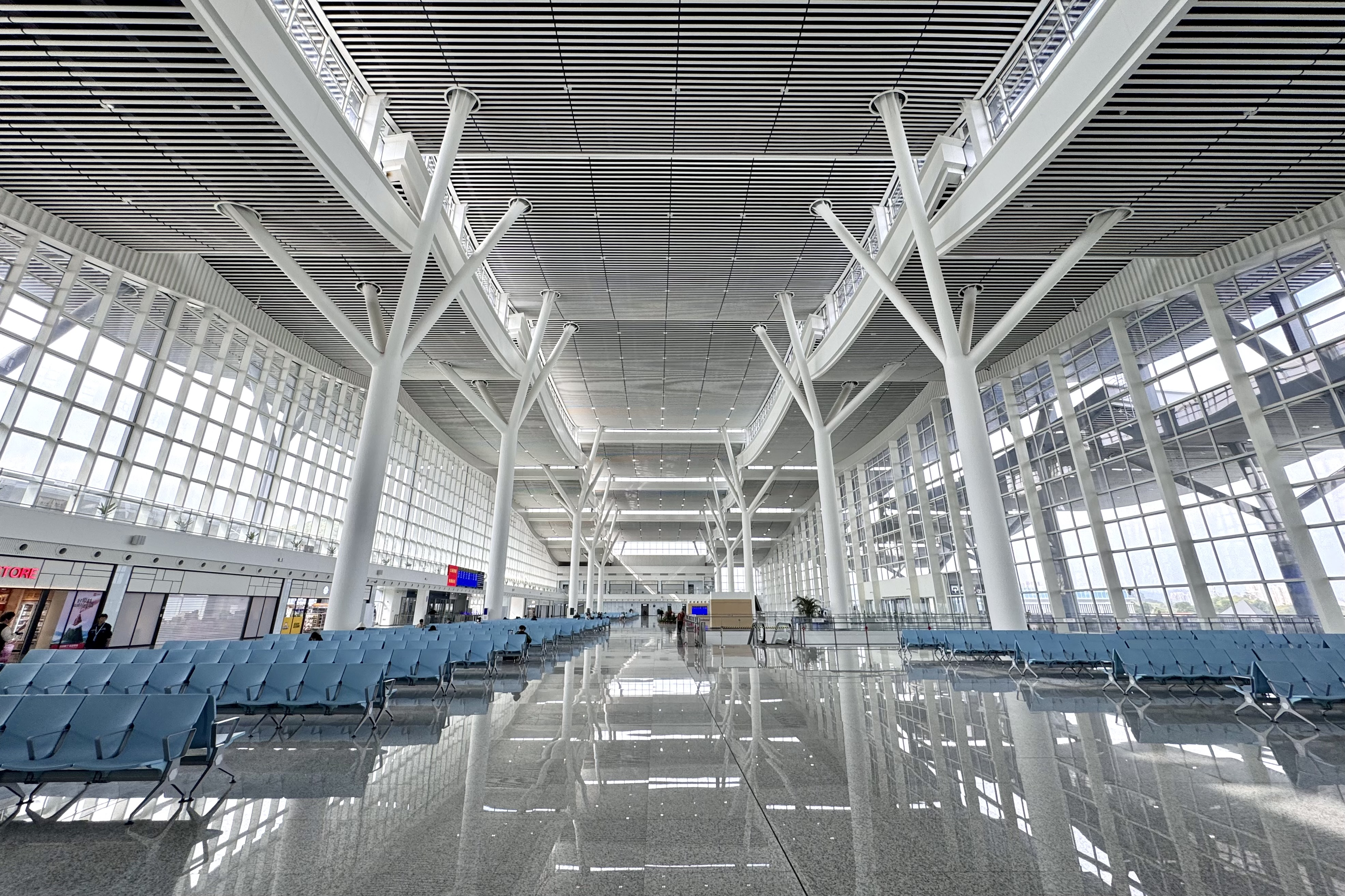
Second-floor concourse

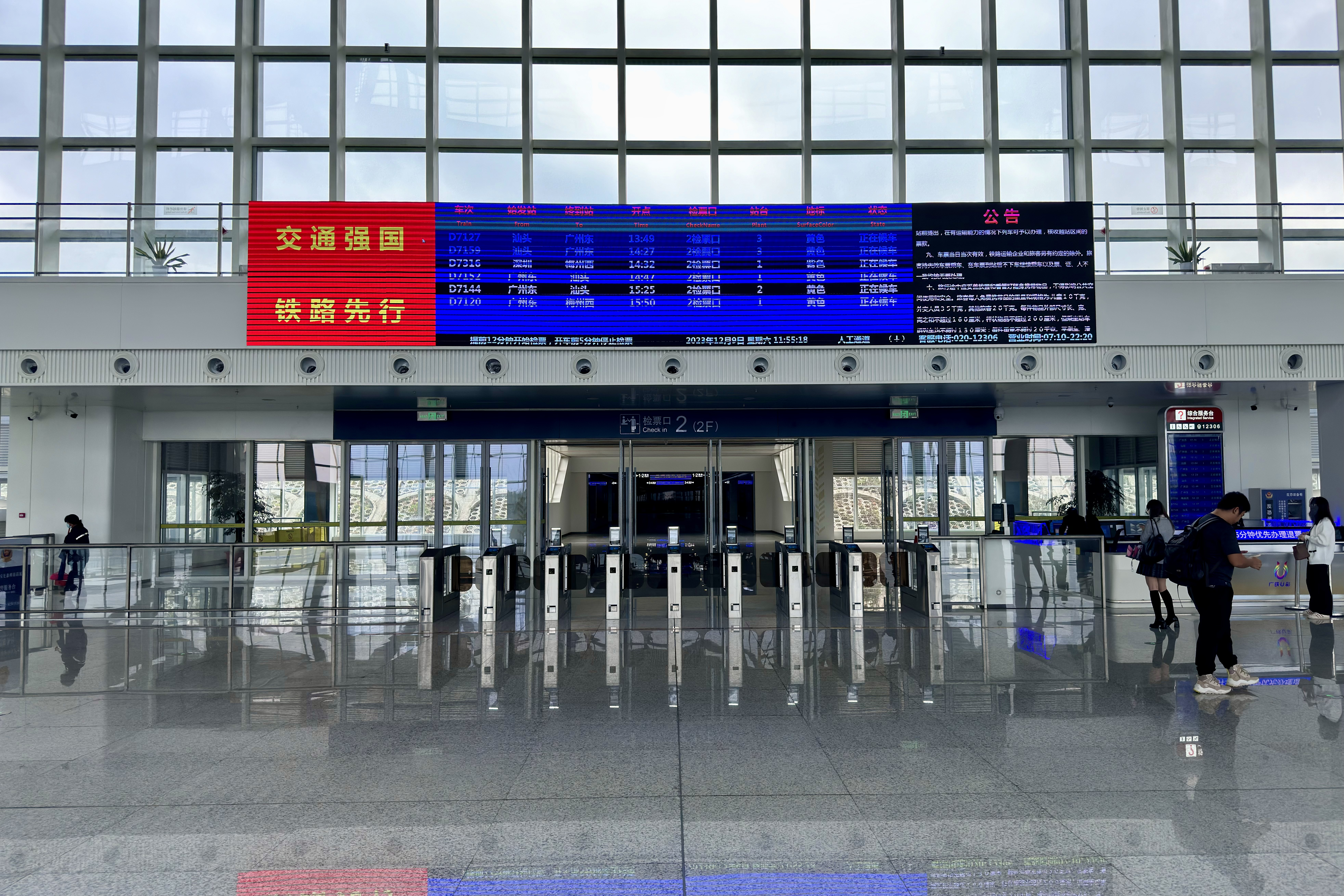
Second-floor check-in gate

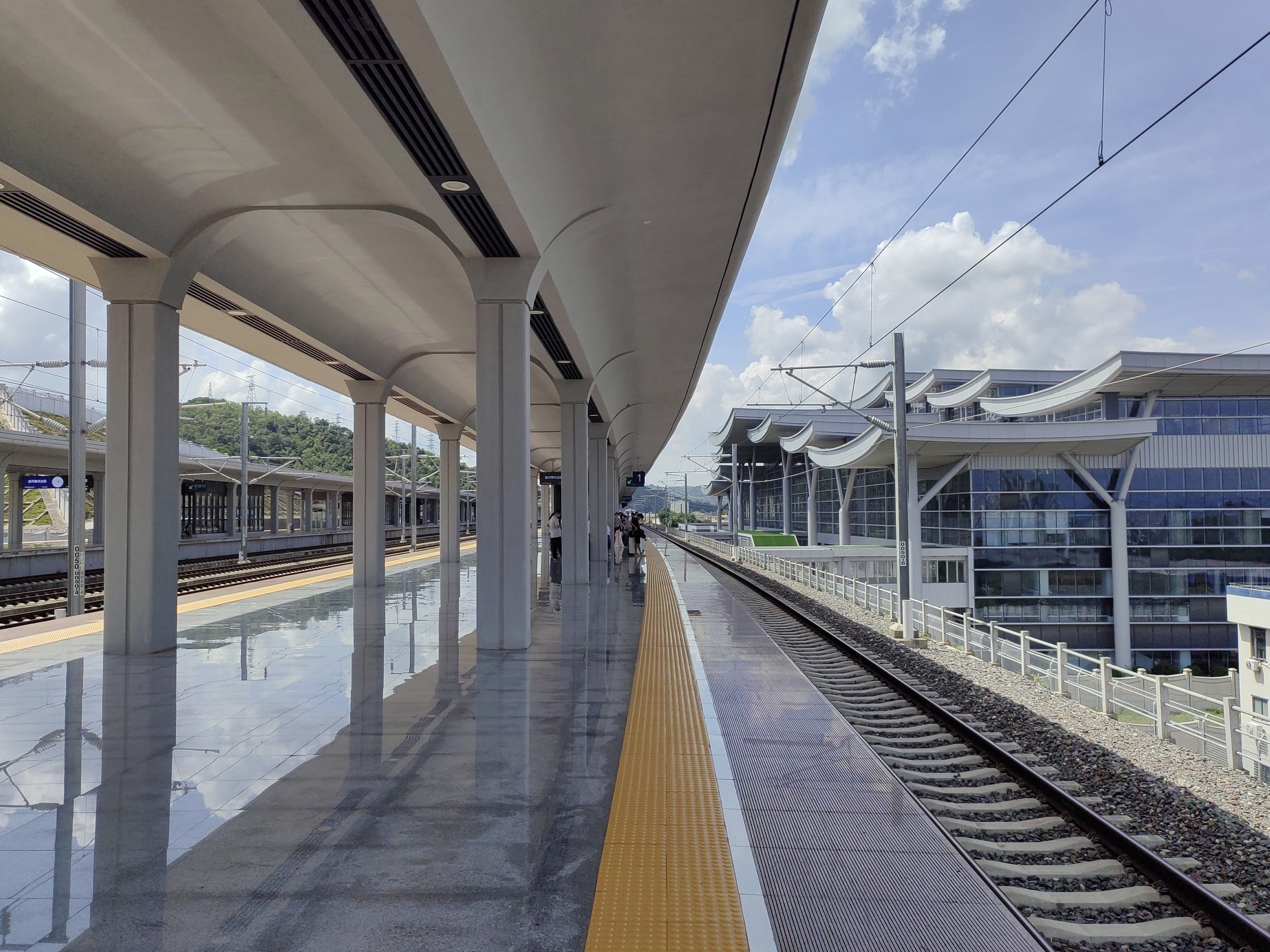
Platform 1

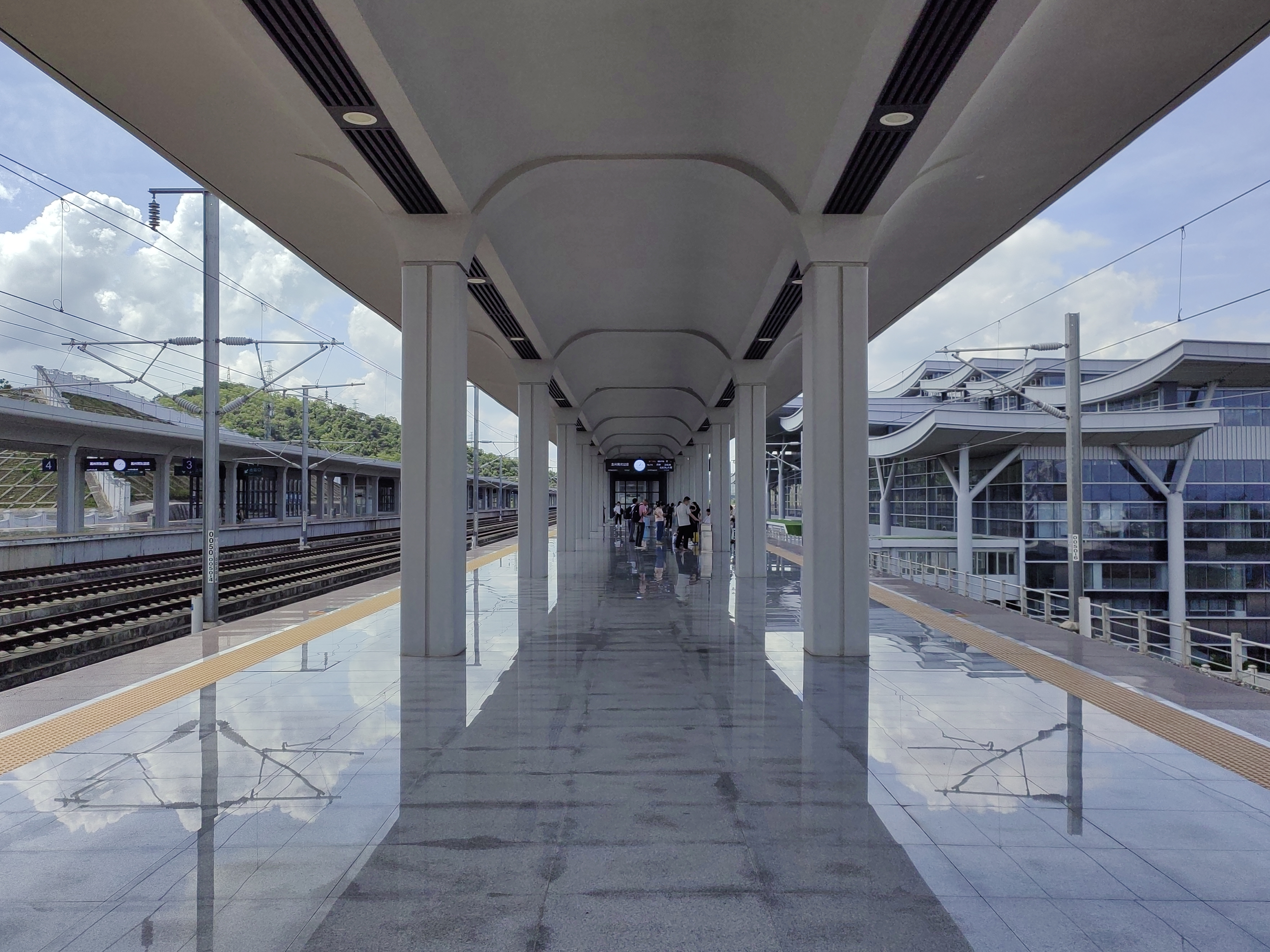
Platform 1 (right) and 2 (left)

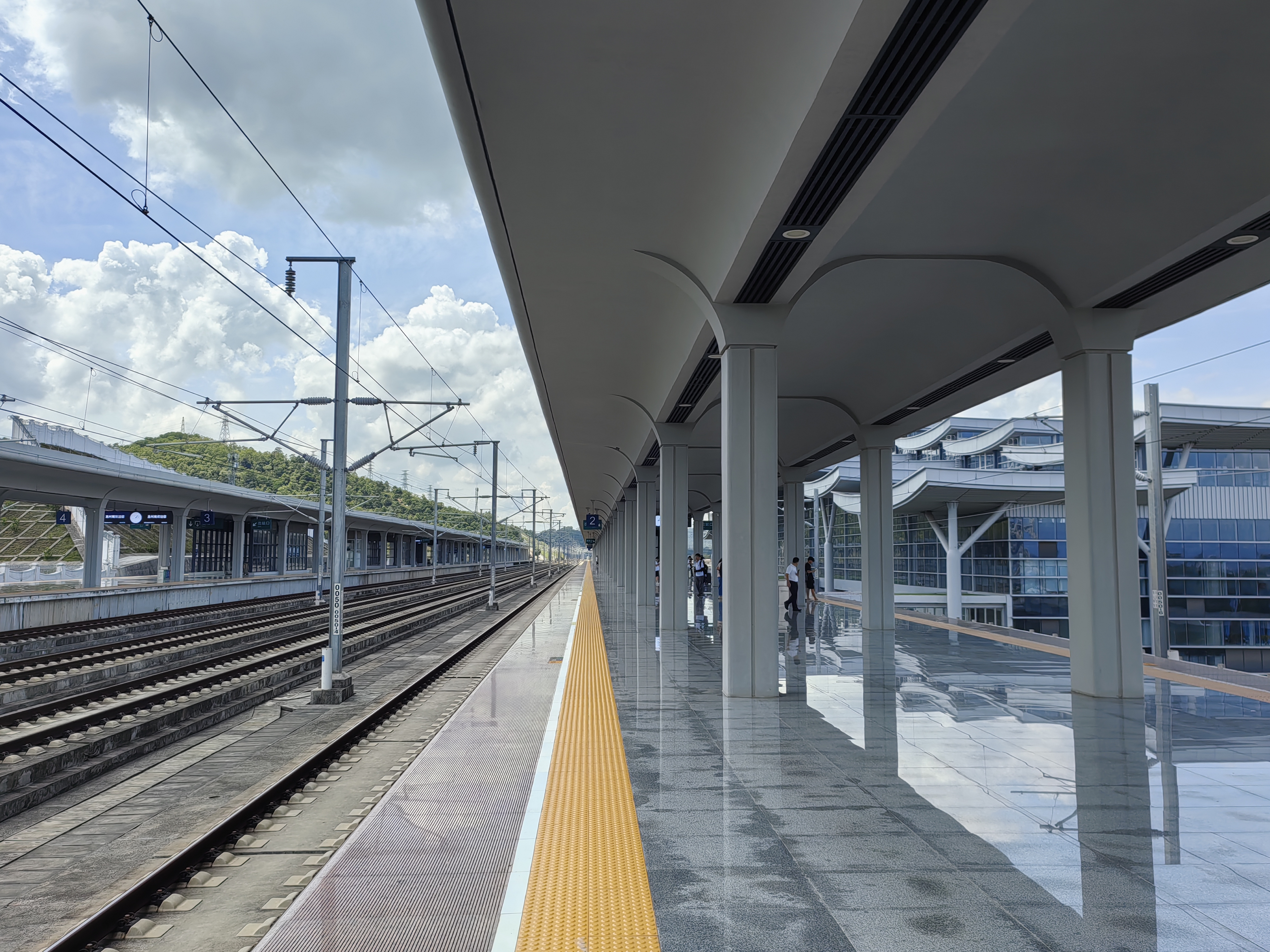
Platform 2

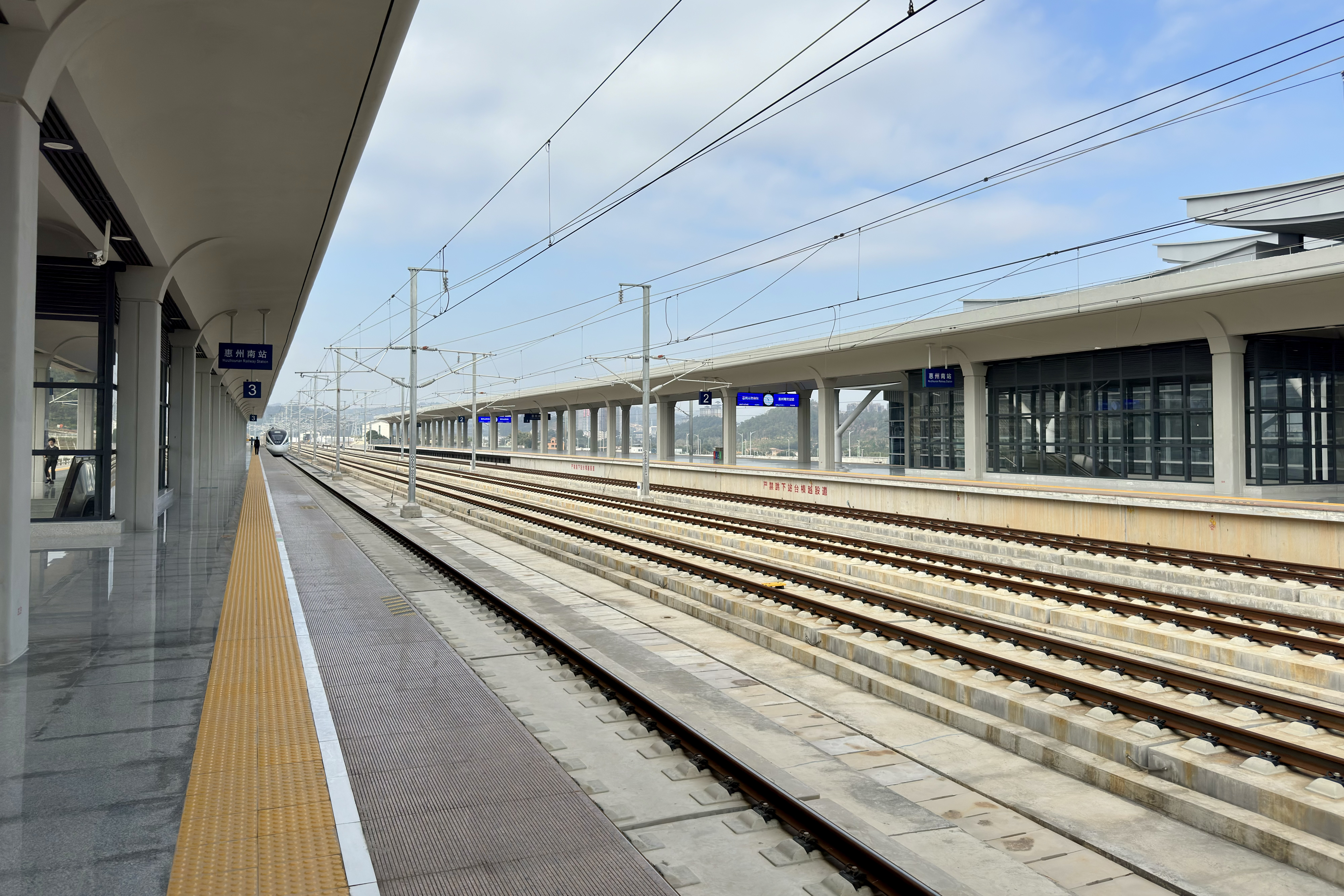
Platform 3
