= Chang'an, Dongguan =

Chang'an 长安镇
- Town
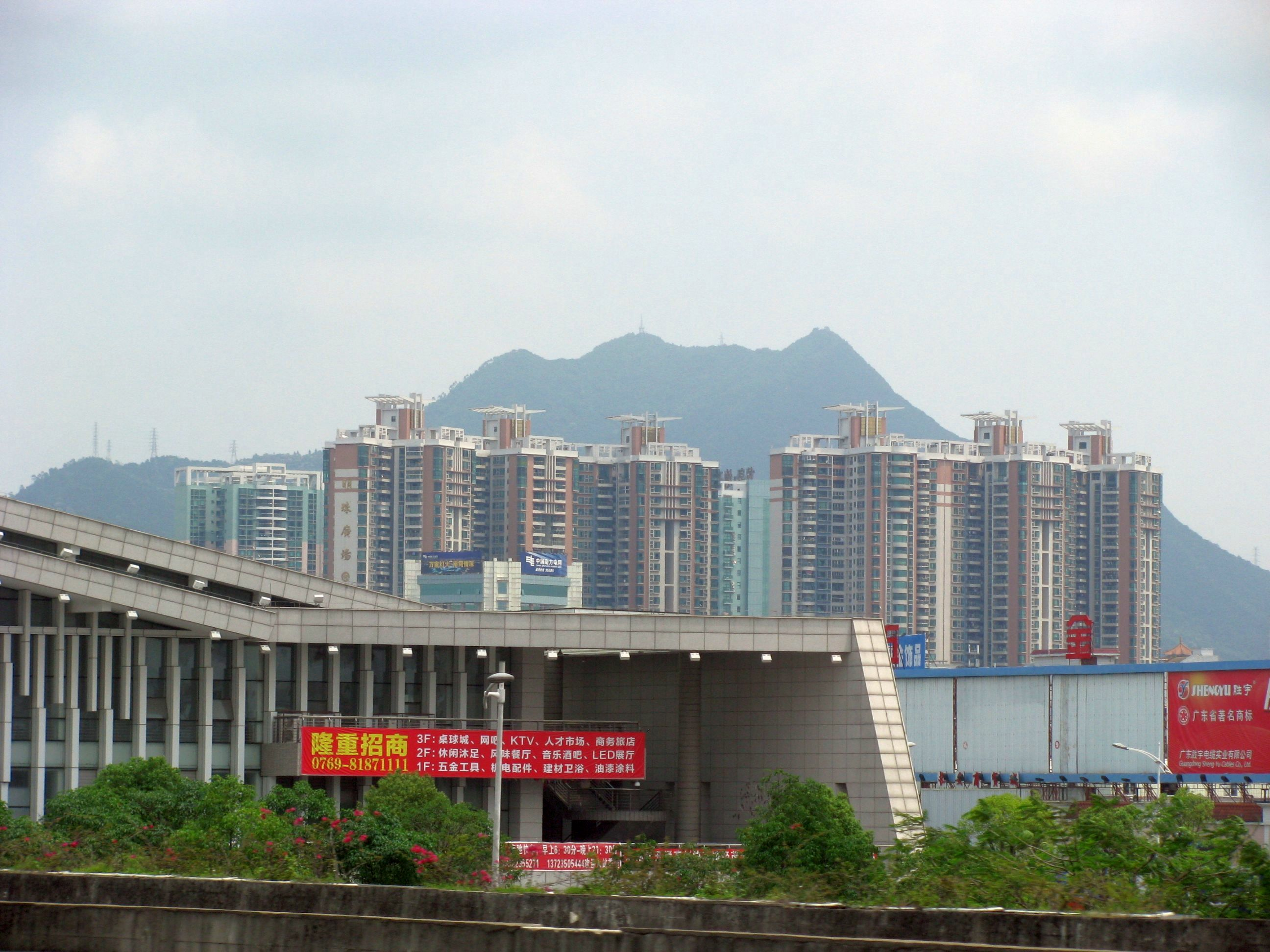

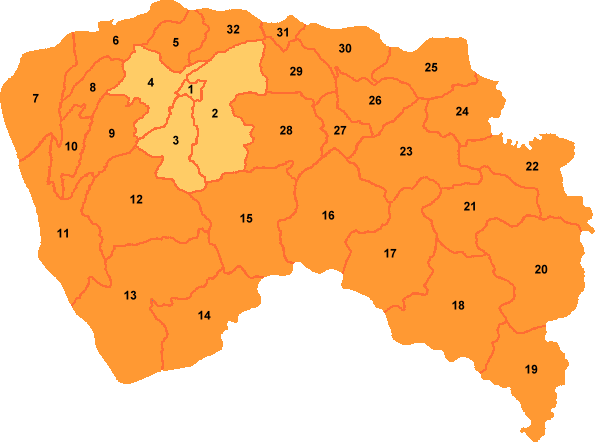
- Chang'an is labelled '14' on this map of Dongguan

- Location in Guangdong
- Coordinates: 22°48′55″N 113°48′09″E
- Country: People's Republic of China
- Province: Guangdong
- Prefecture-level city: Dongguan

Area
  - Total: 81.53 km^{2} (31.48 sq mi)

Population (2021)
  - Total: 807,400
  - Density: 9,903/km^{2} (25,650/sq mi)
- Time zone: UTC+8 (China Standard)

Chang'an, Dongguan
- Simplified Chinese: 长安镇
- Traditional Chinese: 長安鎮
Transcriptions
Standard Mandarin
- Hanyu Pinyin: Cháng'ān zhèn
Yue: Cantonese
- Jyutping: coeng4 ngon1 zan3

Chang'an Town (simplified Chinese: 长安镇; traditional Chinese: 長安鎮; pinyin: Cháng'ān zhèn) is an industrial town in the south east of the Dongguan prefecture-level city in the Pearl River Delta of Guangdong Province, China.

== Population ==
The population of Chang'an was 594,809 at the 2000 Census, making it the most populous town (zhèn) in China at that count. By 2021, according to the local government, the permanent population of Chang'an will be 807,400.

== Economy ==
There are many manufacturing operations which tailor to the needs of the export industry, and as a result, Chang'an is one of the wealthiest districts in China. As Dongguan is an agglomeration of towns without a central core (multicore), the town is more economically connected to adjacent Shenzhen than the smaller urban cores of Dongguan.

== Transportation ==
State Highway 107, Guangshen Expressway G4 and Guangshen Yanjiang Expressway S3 run through the area.
