= Yangmeikeng =

Scenic area in Shenzhen, China

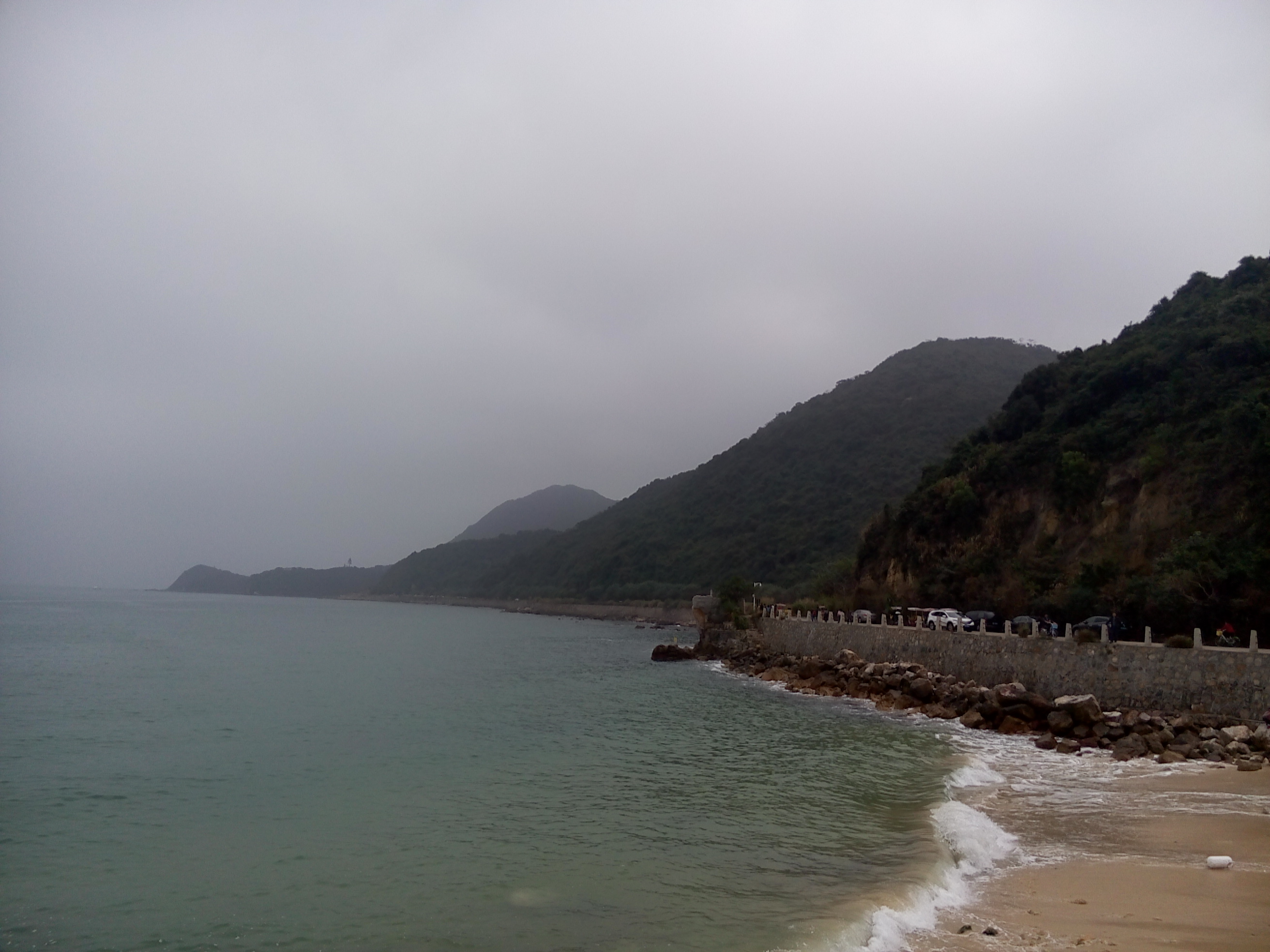
Yangmeikeng

Yangmeikeng (Chinese: 杨梅坑) is a valley and scenic spot facing Daya Bay, on the Dapeng Peninsula, Dapeng New District, Shenzhen, China. Yangmeikeng is particularly famous for its natural beaches. Many chose to rent bikes to ride along the seashore.

== Neighbouring attractions ==
- Qiniangshan
- Dapeng Fortress
