= Hong'ao Park station =

Shenzhen Metro Line 13 station

Hong'ao Park 红坳公园
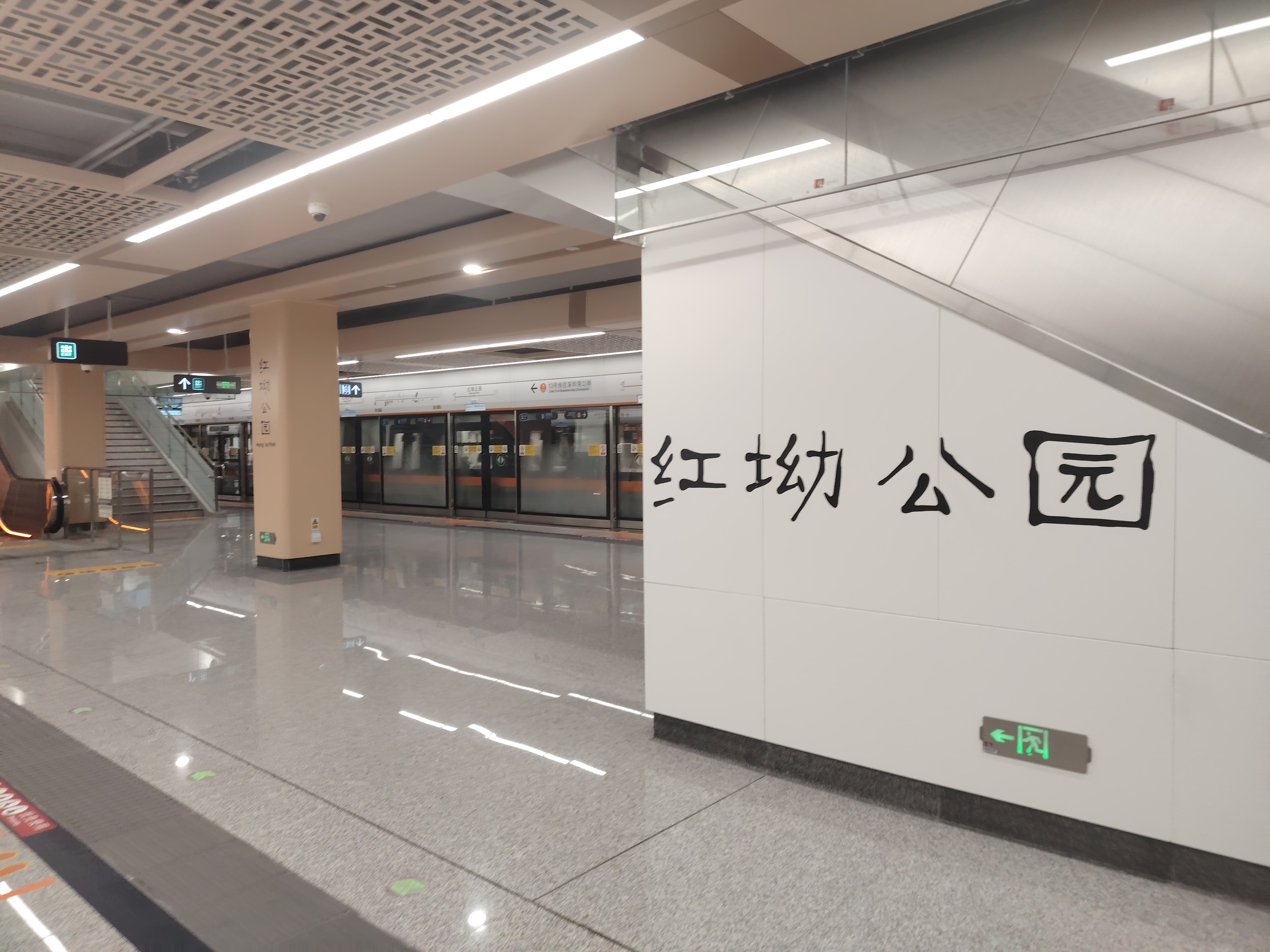
- Platform calligraphy

Chinese name
- Traditional Chinese: 紅坳公園
- Simplified Chinese: 红坳公园
Transcriptions
Standard Mandarin
- Hanyu Pinyin: Hóngào Gōngyuán
Yue: Cantonese
- Yale Romanization: Hùngaau Gūng'yún
- Jyutping: hung4 aau3 gung1 jyun4

General information
- Location: Changzhen Road (长圳路), between Guangbu Road (光布路) and Fengxiang Road (凤祥路); Fenghuang Subdistrict, Guangming District, Shenzhen, Guangdong; China
- Coordinates: 22°43′35.6″N 113°56′29.2″E
- Operated by: MTR China Railway Electrification Rail Transit (Shenzhen) Co., Ltd (MTR Rail Transit (Shenzhen) Co., Ltd. and China Railway Electrification Bureau Group Co., Ltd.)
- Line: Line 13
- Platforms: 2 (1 island platform)
- Tracks: 2

Construction
- Structure type: Underground
- Accessible: Yes

History
- Opened: 28 June 2026 (21 days ago)

Services
Preceding station	Shenzhen Metro	Following station
Shangwu towards Shenzhen Bay Checkpoint	Line 13	Guangmingcheng towards Lisonglang
Location

Hong'ao Park station (Chinese: 红坳公园站; pinyin: Hóngào Gōngyuán Zhàn; Cantonese Yale: Hùngaau Gūng'yún Jaahm) is a station on Line 13 of Shenzhen Metro. It opened on 28 June 2026, and is located in Fenghuang Subdistrict in Guangming District.

== Station layout ==
The station is a two-level underground island platform station. It adpots the construction method of "internal support + large block + fully prefabricated", which is the first of its kind in the country. The station is also one of the four distinctive stations on the Line 13 Phase II northern extension. Because it is close to the Guangming Campus of Shenzhen Traditional Chinese Medicine Hospital, its design theme is "Inheritance of National Essence and Traditional Chinese Medicine Culture". The station uses Chinese architectural elements such as wood grain color, scroll shape, meander pattern grille, and curved square tubes to create a dignified, elegant, and warm public transportation space.

G	-	Exits A-D
B1F; Concourse	Lobby	Ticket Machines, Customer Service, Shops, Station Control Room, Toilets, Nursery
B2F; Platforms	Platform 1	13 towards Shenzhen Bay Checkpoint (Shangwu)
B2F; Platforms	Island platform, doors will open on the left
B2F; Platforms	Platform 2	13 towards Lisonglang (Guangmingcheng)

=== Gallery ===
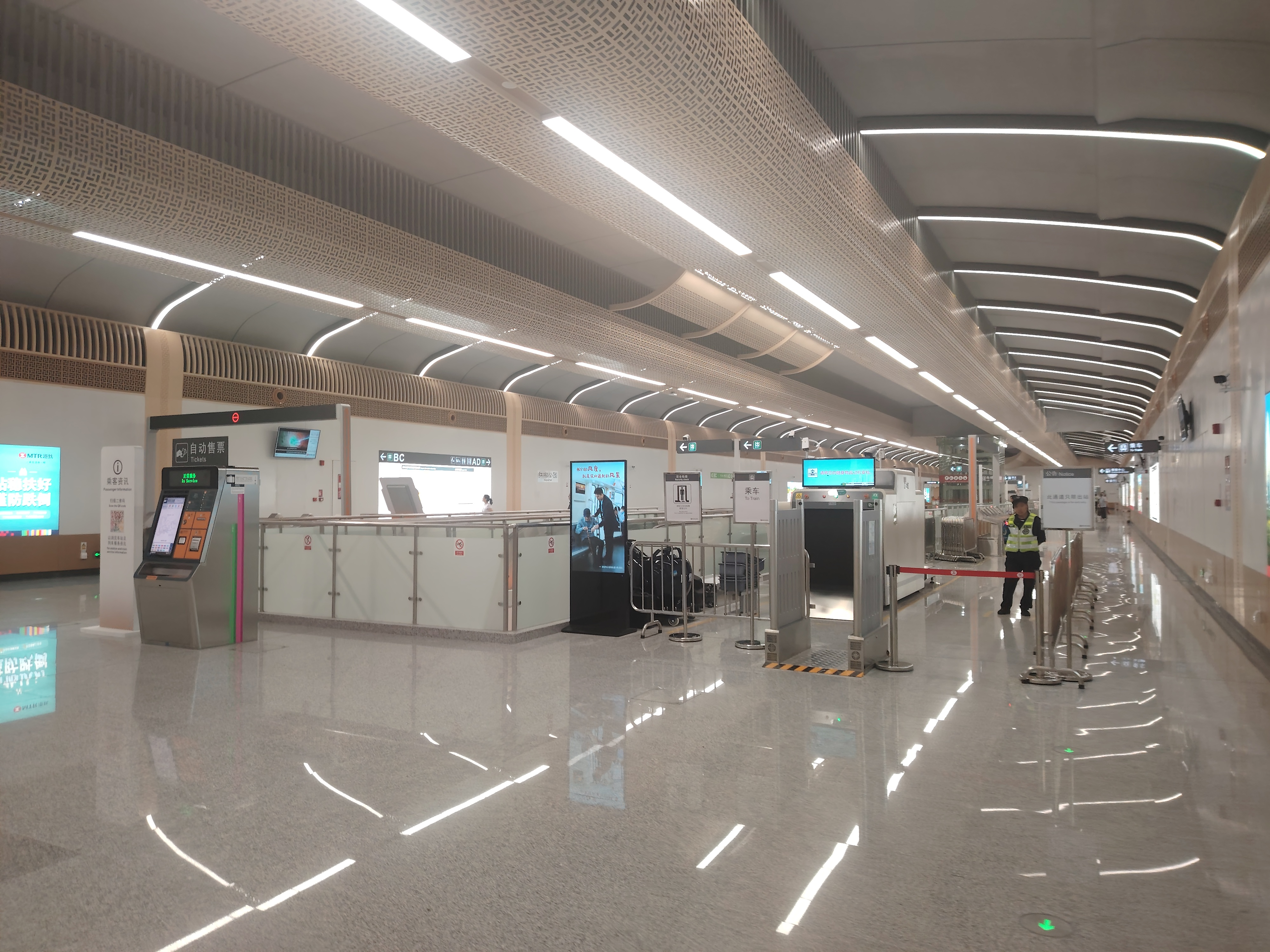
Concourse, decorated with a traditional Chinese style and ancient charm theme, incorporating a series of traditional Chinese architectural elements

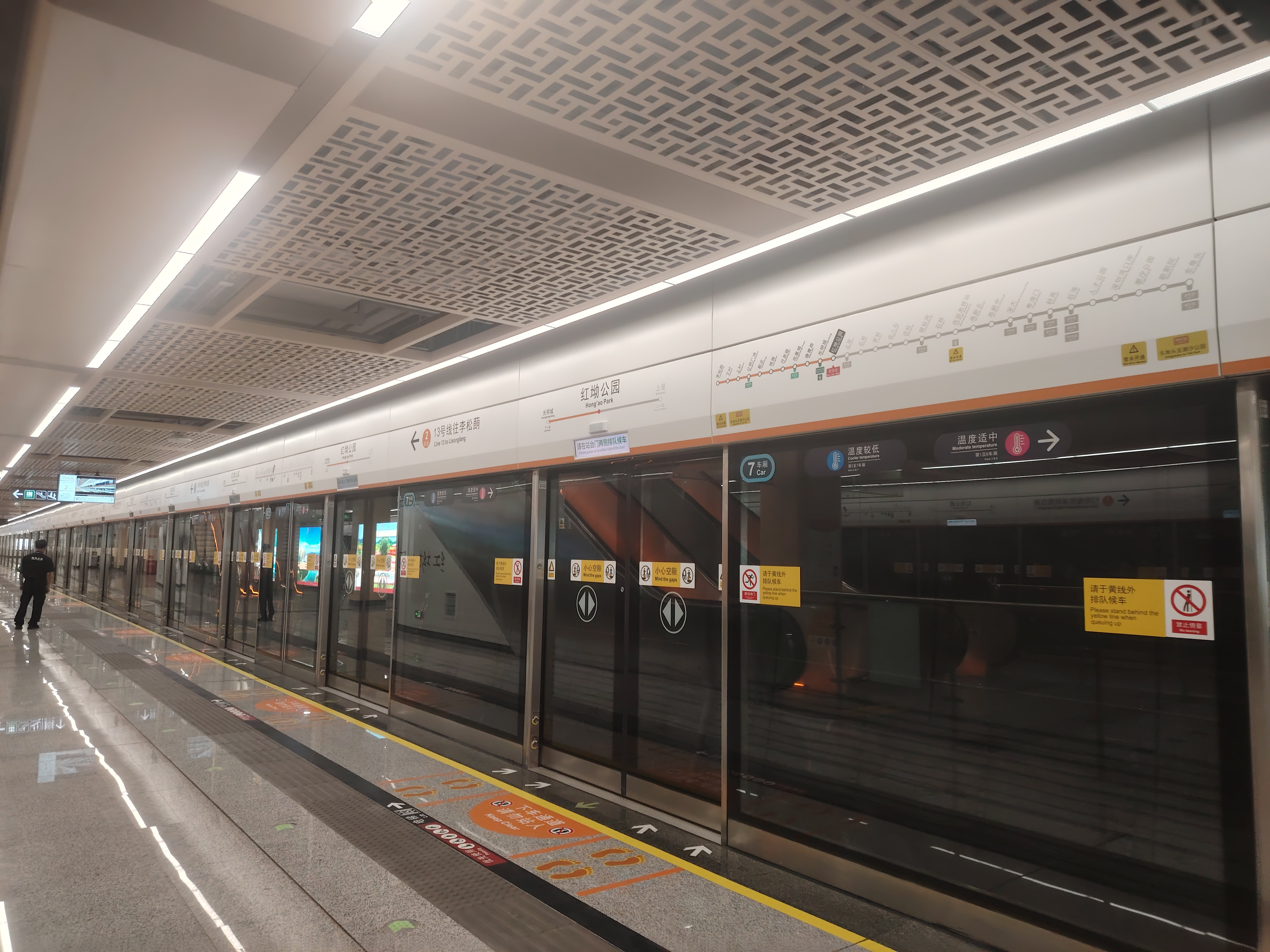
Platform

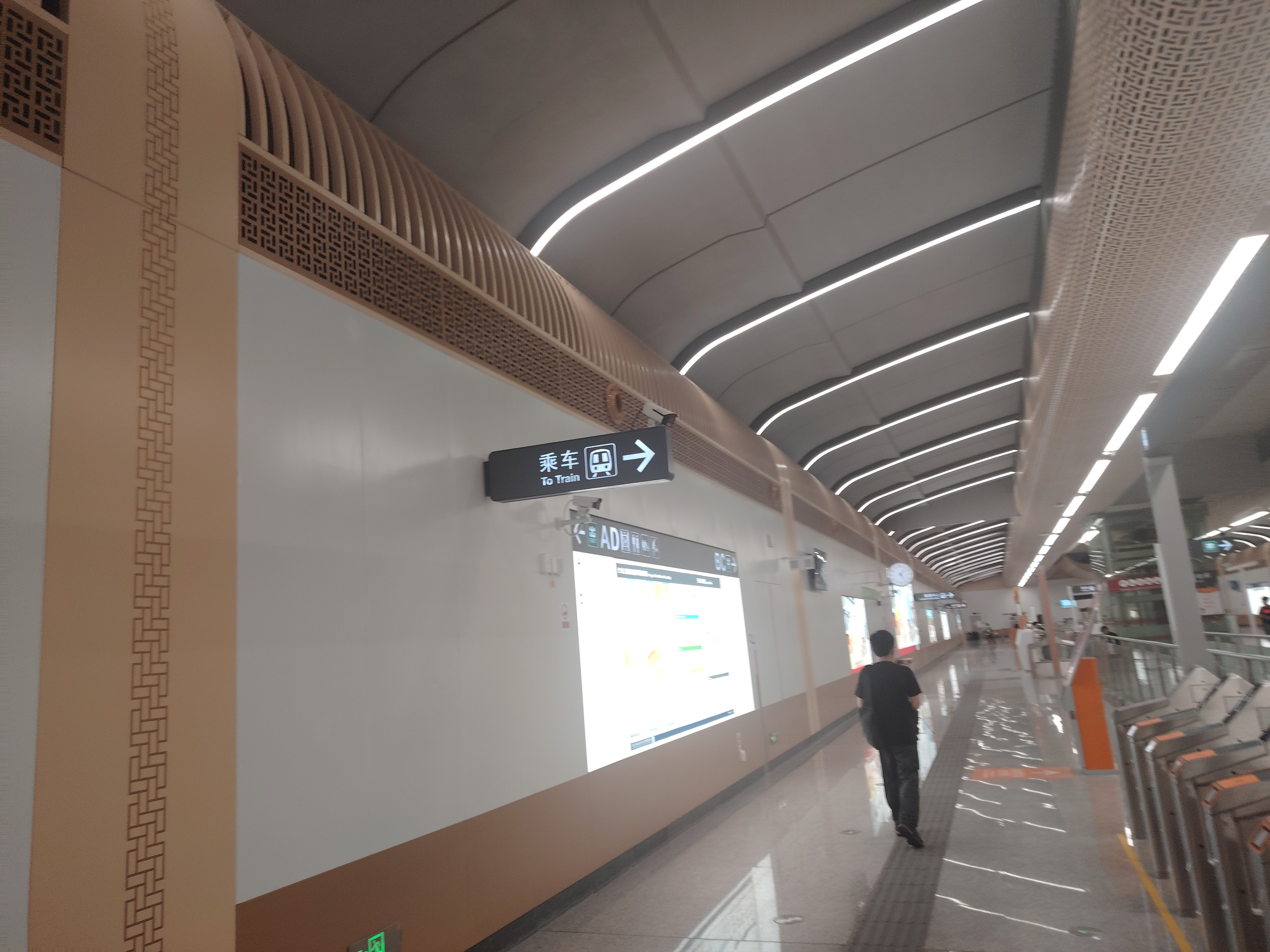
Side wall detailing

=== Entrances/exits ===
The station has 4 points of entry/exit. Exits A and D are equipped with elevators, notably the latter has two.

- : Changzhen Road, Guangbu Road, Fenghuang Community Naitoushan Sports Park, East Gate of TCL CSOT Optoelectronics General Factory
- : Changzhen Road, Changfeng Road, Fenghuang Community Naitoushan Sports Park
- : Changzhun Road, Fengxiang Road, Shenzhen Traditional Chinese Medicine Hospital Guangming Campus
- : Guangbu Road, Changzhen Road, Shenzhen Traditional Chinese Medicine Hospital Guangming Campus, Guangqiao Road, Tangjia New Village, Shenzhen Western Bus Tangjia Station
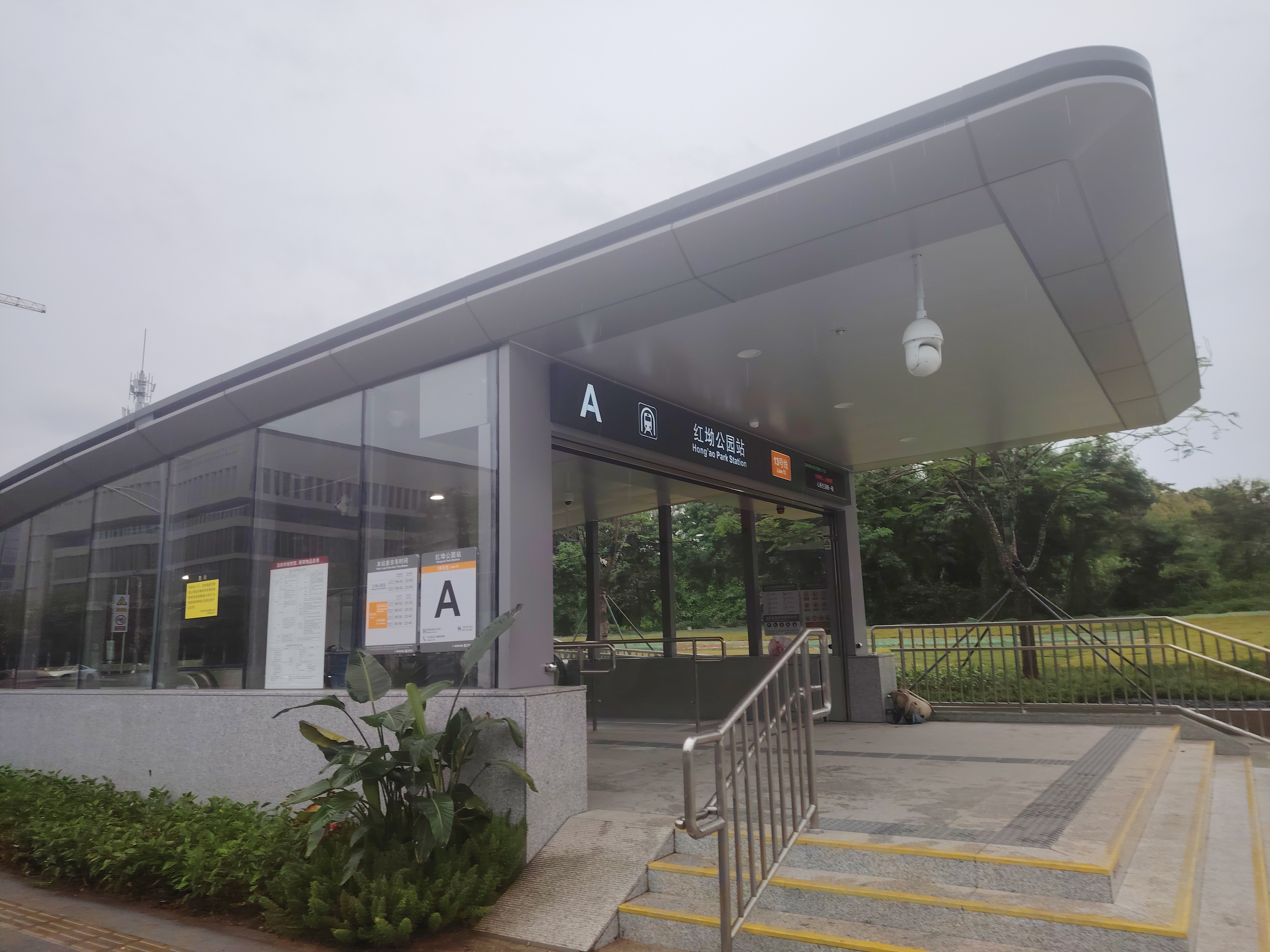
Entrance A

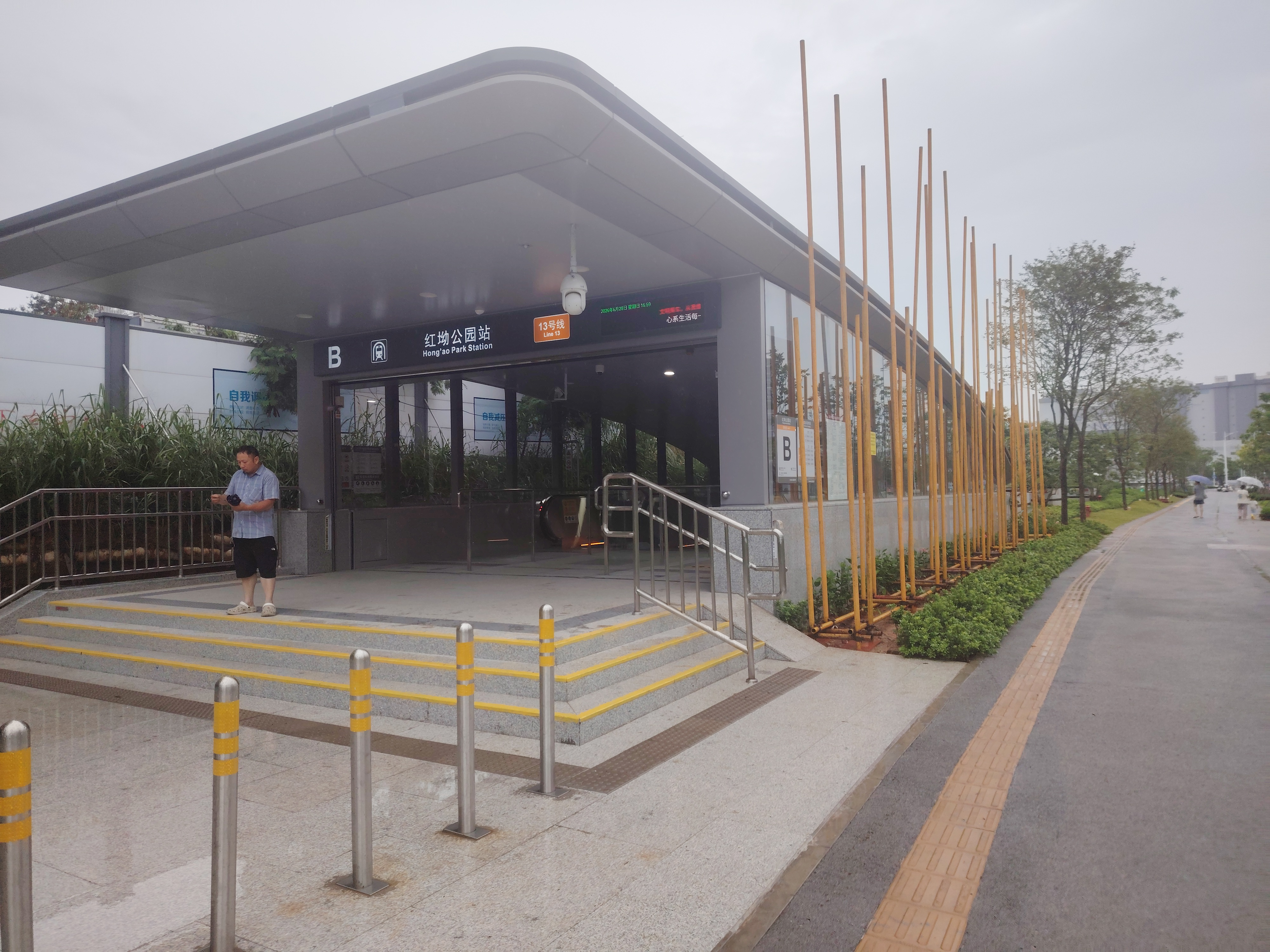
Entrance B

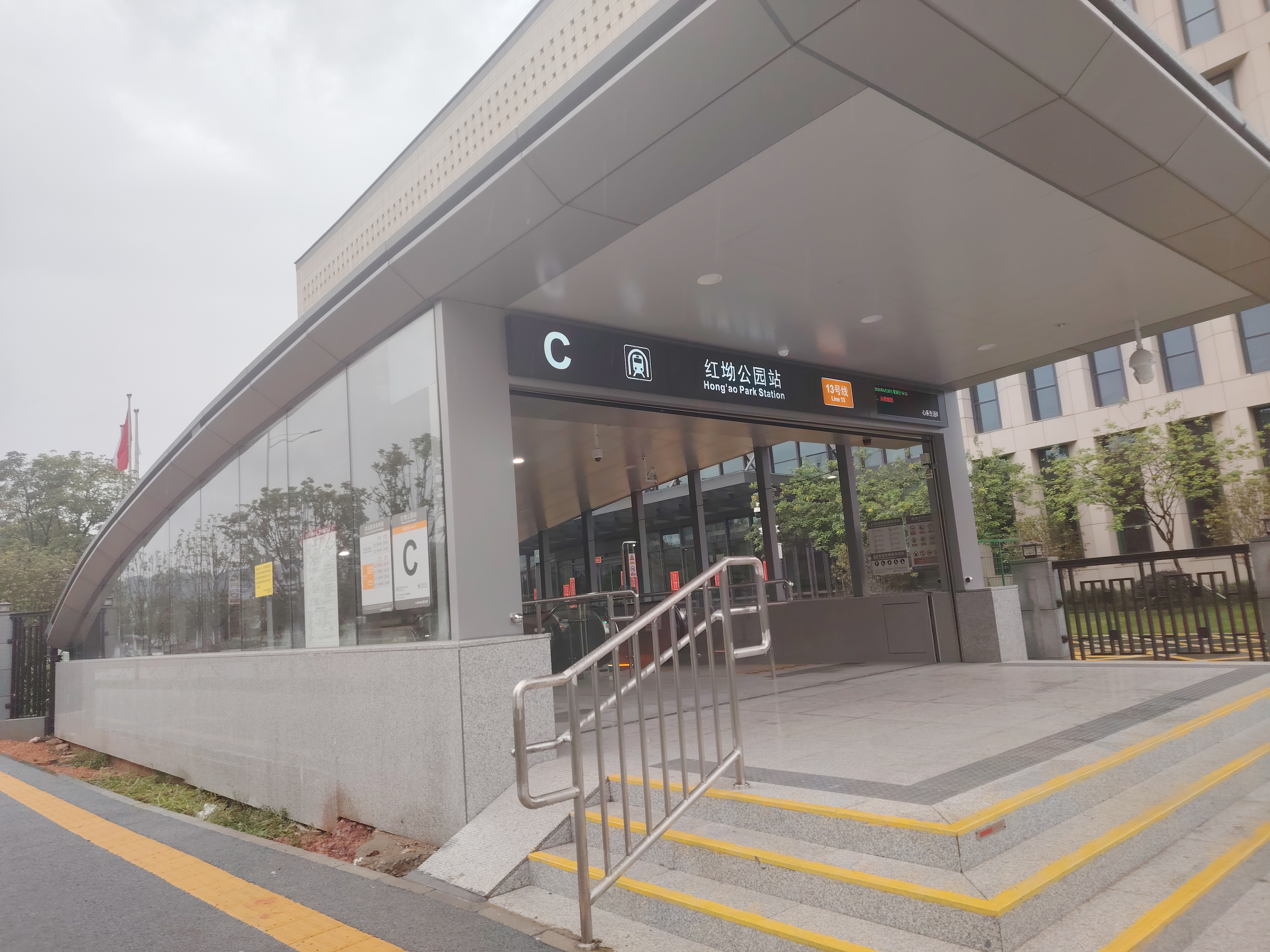
Entrance C

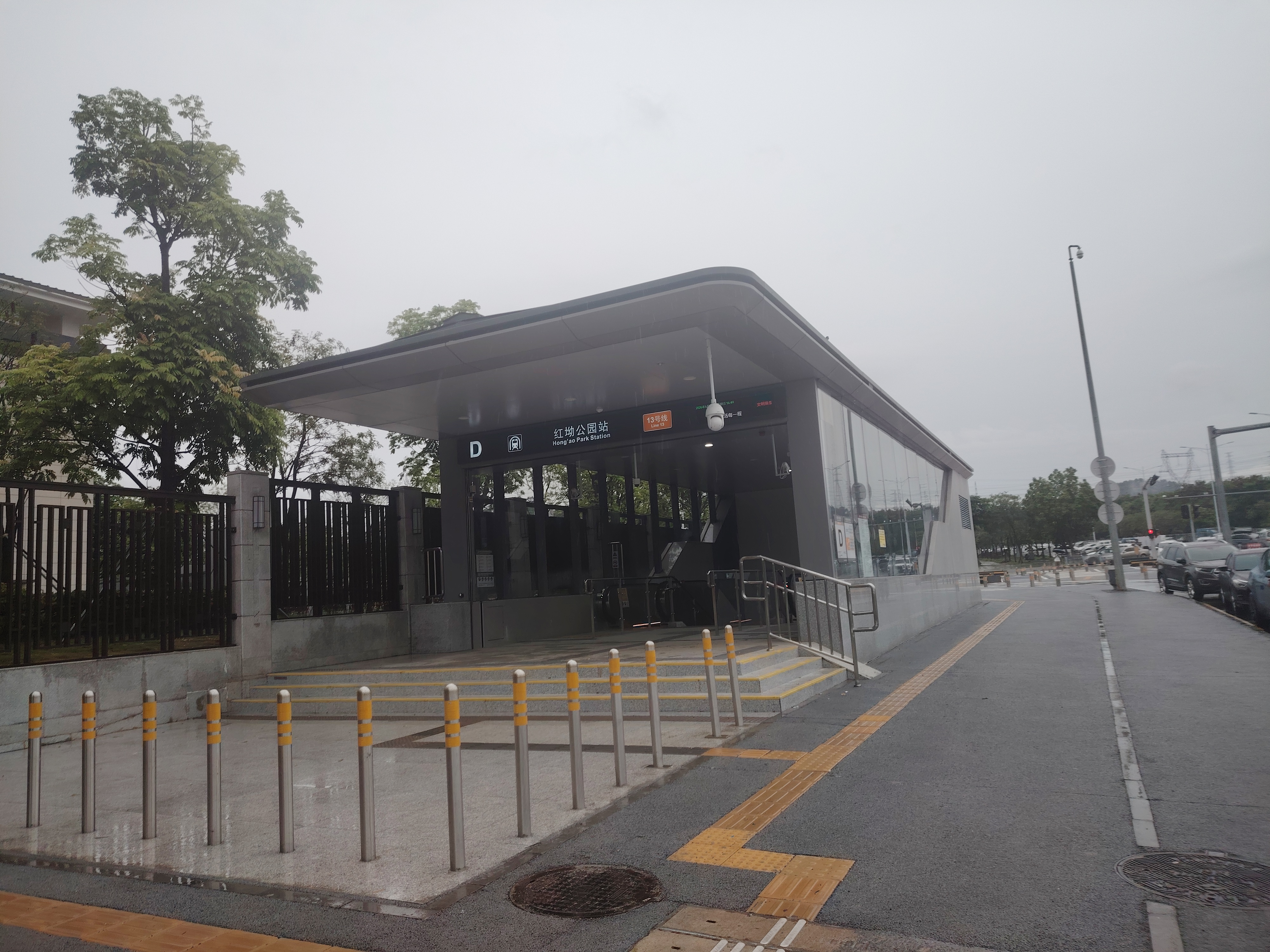
Entrance D

== History ==
During construction, the station was called City Hospital of Traditional Chinese Medicine station because it was close to the Guangming Campus of Shenzhen Municipal Hospital of Traditional Chinese Medicine.

In April 2024, the Shenzhen Municipal Planning and Natural Resources Bureau issued the naming conventions for the stations in the "Shenzhen Rail Transit Phase IV Adjustment Project". Due to the large number of campuses of Shenzhen Traditional Chinese Medicine Hospital and the unclear orientation of the Guangming campus rather than the main campus, the nearby community park, which is called Hong'ao Park, was used for the station name, which then became Hong'ao Park station.

The station opened as part of Line 13 Phase II northern extension on 28 June 2026.
