= Shangwu station =

Shenzhen Metro Line 6 and Line 13 station

Shangwu 上屋
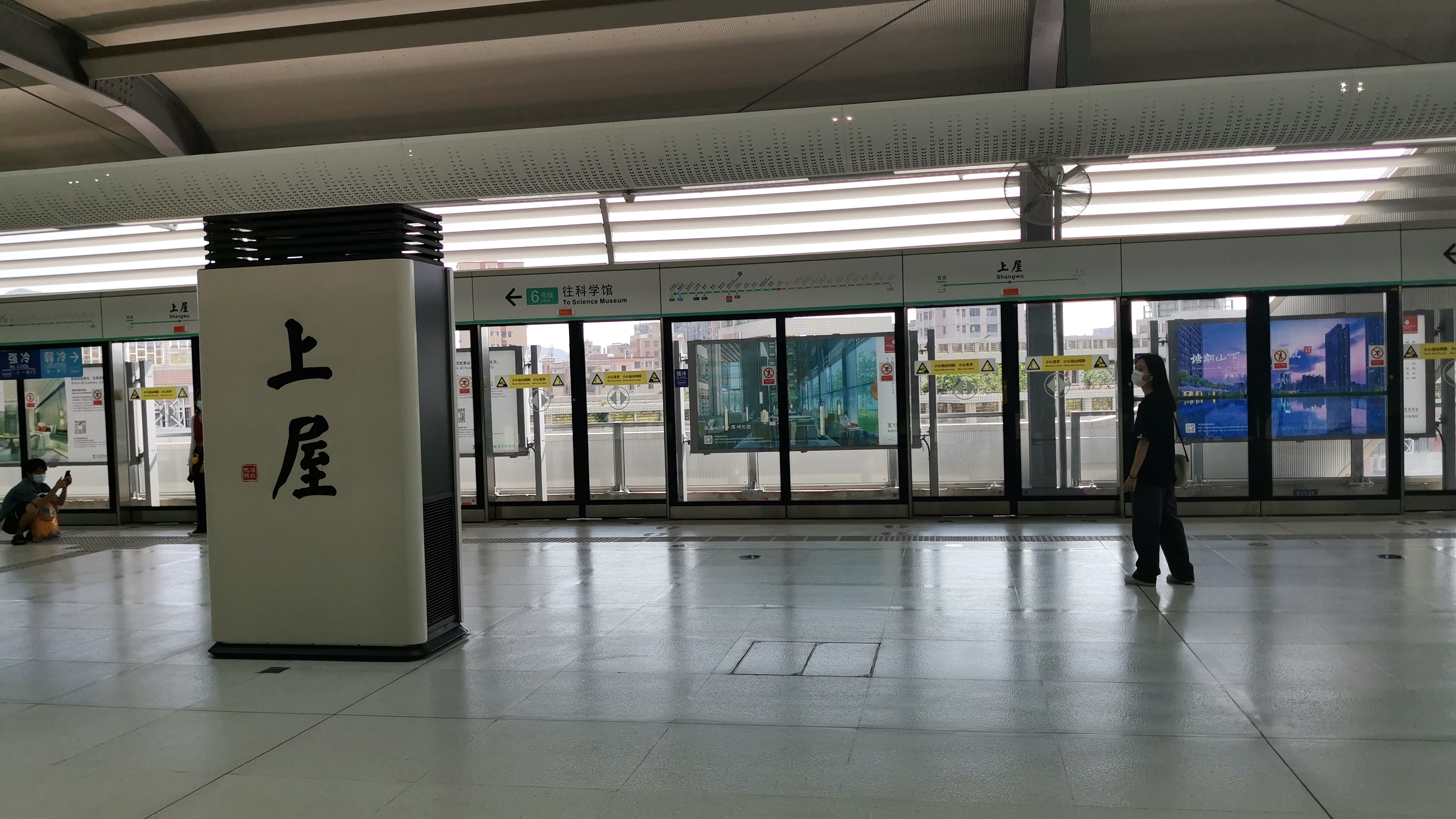
- Line 6 platform

Chinese name
- Chinese: 上屋
Transcriptions
Standard Mandarin
- Hanyu Pinyin: Shàngwū
Yue: Cantonese
- Yale Romanization: Seuhngūk
- Jyutping: soeng^{6} uk^{1}

General information
- Location: Intersection of Shiyan North Ring Road (石岩北环路) and Shangwu Avenue (上屋大道); Shiyan Subdistrict, Bao'an District, Shenzhen, Guangdong; China
- Coordinates: 22°41′31.4″N 113°56′1.11″E
- Operated by: SZMC (Shenzhen Metro Group) (Line 6); MTR China Railway Electrification Rail Transit (Shenzhen) Co., Ltd (MTR Rail Transit (Shenzhen) Co., Ltd. and China Railway Electrification Bureau Group Co., Ltd.) (Line 13)
- Lines: Line 6; Line 13
- Platforms: 4 (2 island platforms)
- Tracks: 4

Construction
- Structure type: Elevated (Line 6); Underground (Line 13)
- Accessible: Yes

History
- Opened: Line 6: 18 August 2020 (5 years ago); Line 13: 28 December 2025 (6 months ago)

Services
Preceding station	Shenzhen Metro	Following station
Changzhen towards Songgang	Line 6	Guantian towards Science Museum
Shiyan towards Shenzhen Bay Checkpoint	Line 13	Hong'ao Park towards Lisonglang
Location

Shangwu station (Chinese: 上屋站; pinyin: Shàngwū Zhàn; Jyutping: soeng^{6} uk^{1}; Cantonese Yale: Seuhngūk Jaahm) is an interchange station between Line 6 and Line 13 of the Shenzhen Metro. The Line 6 station opened on 18 August 2020, and the Line 13 station opened on 28 December 2025.

== Station layout ==
3F; 6 Platforms		6 towards Science Museum (Guantian)
3F; 6 Platforms	Island platform, doors will open on the left
3F; 6 Platforms		6 towards Songgang (Changzhen)
2F; 6 Concourse	Lobby	Ticket Machines, Customer Service, Station Control Room, Transfer Passage
G	-	Exits B-H
B2F; 13 Concourse	Lobby	Ticket Machines, Customer Service, Station Control Room, Toilets
B3F; 13 Platforms	Platform 1	13 towards Shenzhen Bay Checkpoint (Shiyan)
B3F; 13 Platforms	Island platform, doors will open on the left
B3F; 13 Platforms	Platform 2	13 towards Lisonglang (Hong'ao Park)

=== Gallery ===
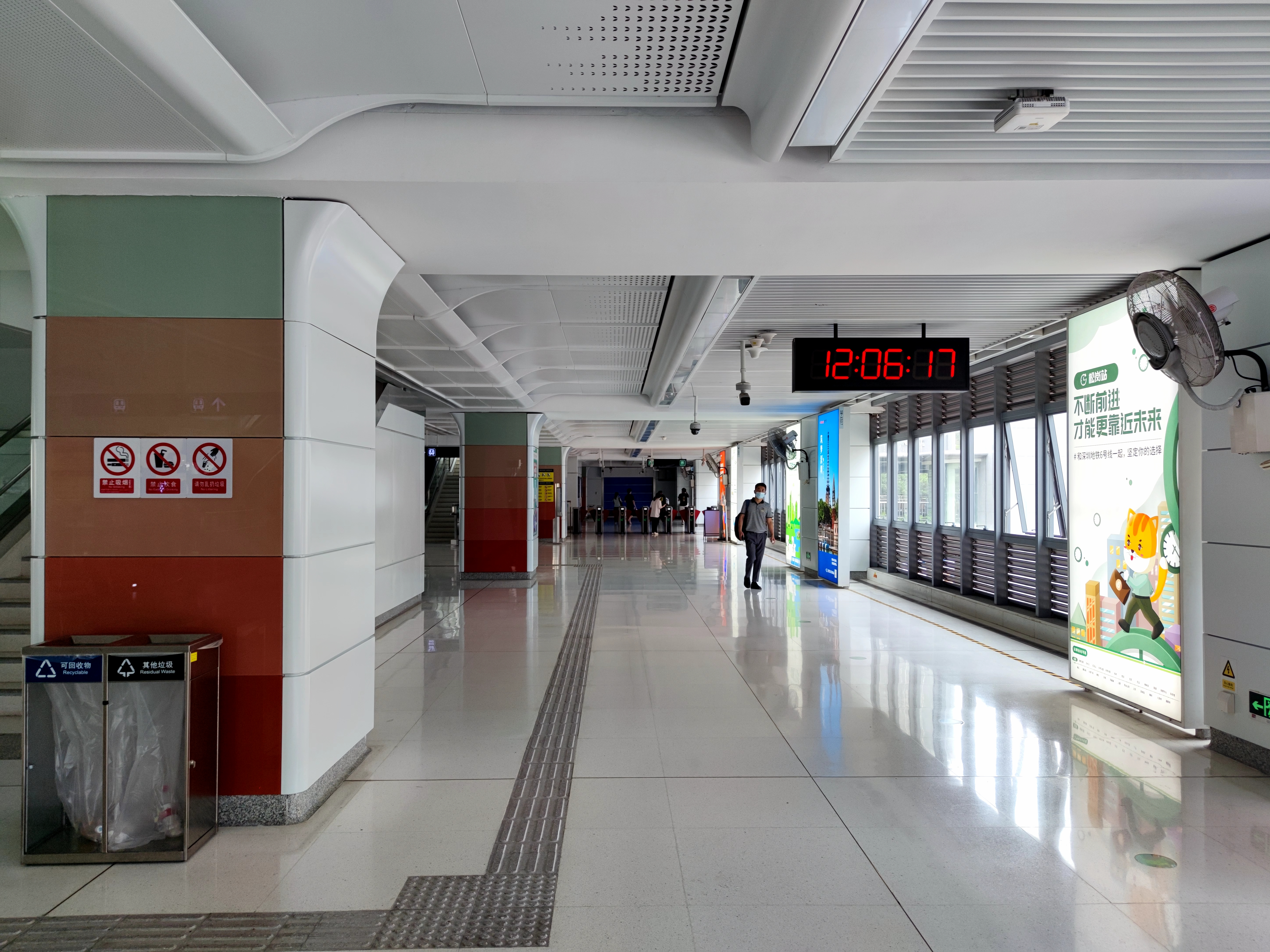
Line 6 concourse

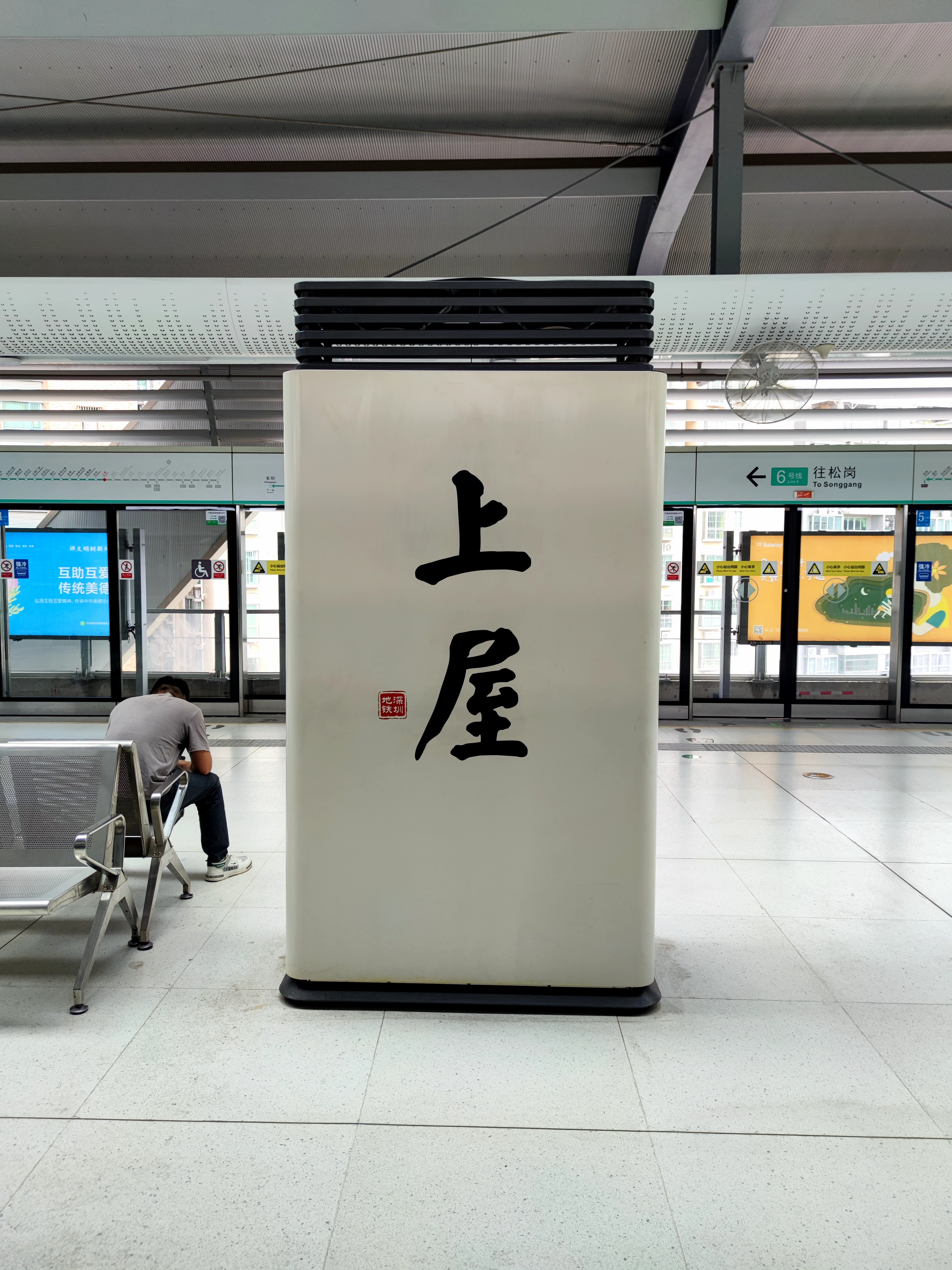
Line 6 platform calligraphy

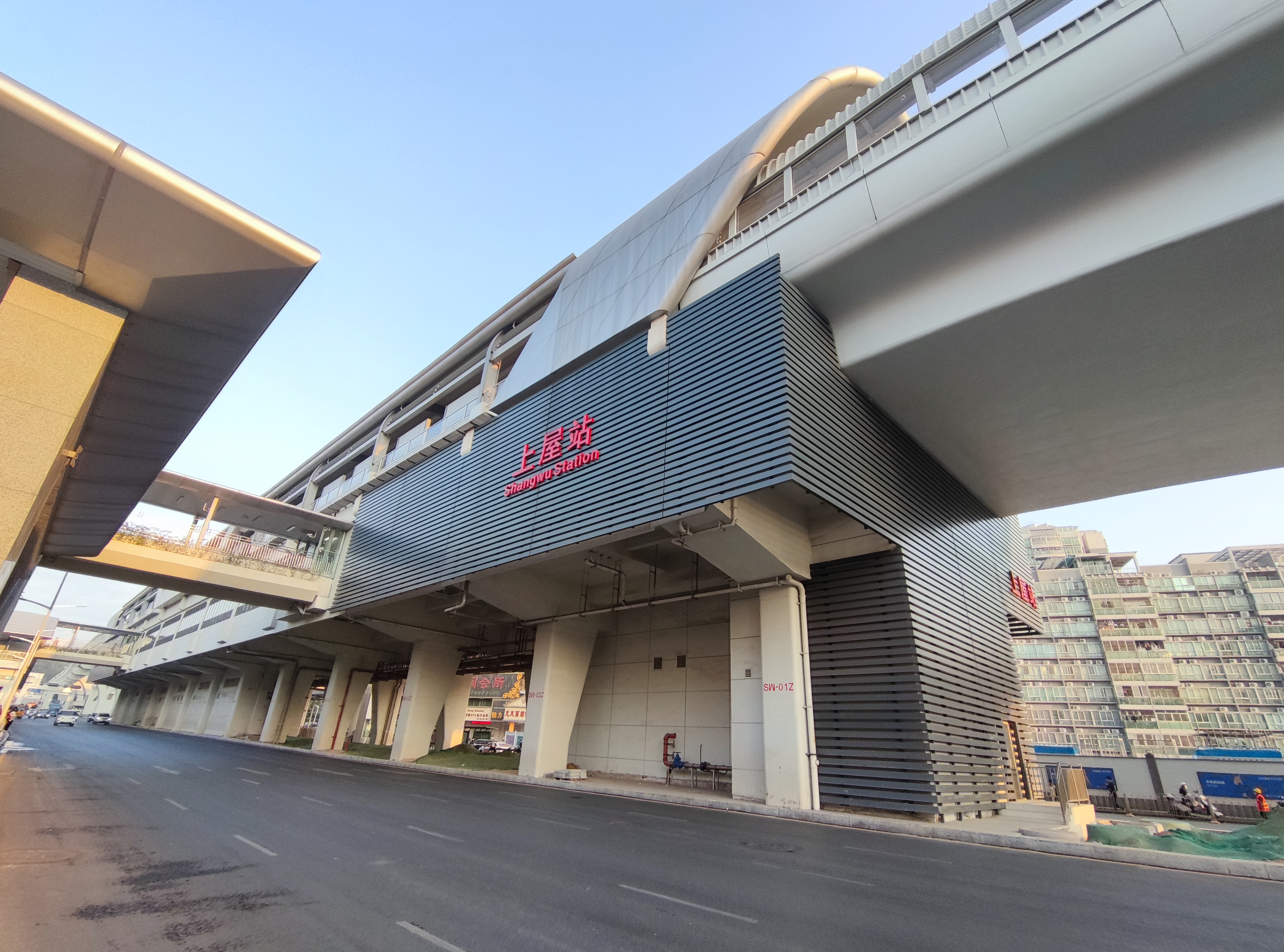
Line 6 station exterior

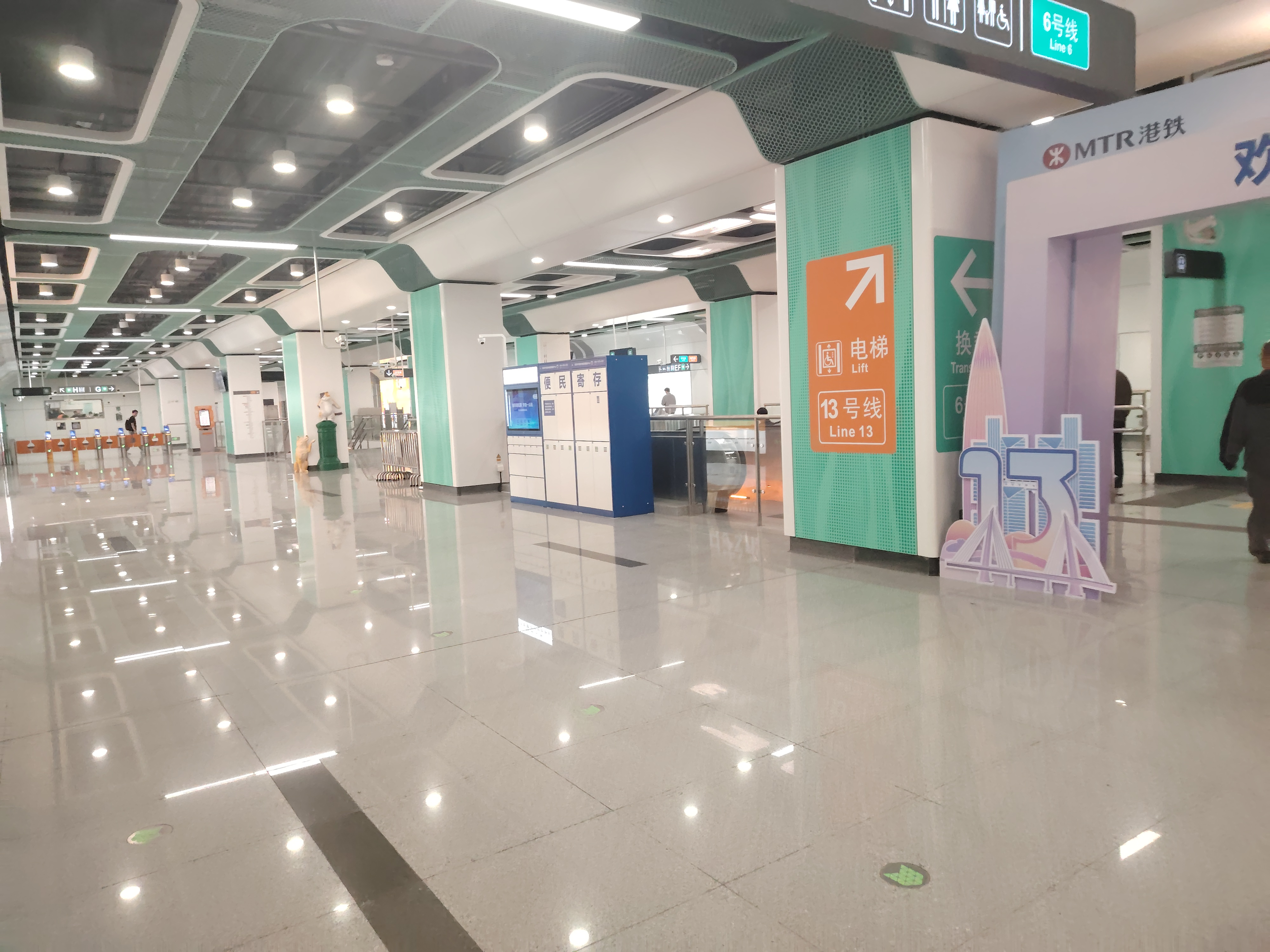
Line 13 concourse

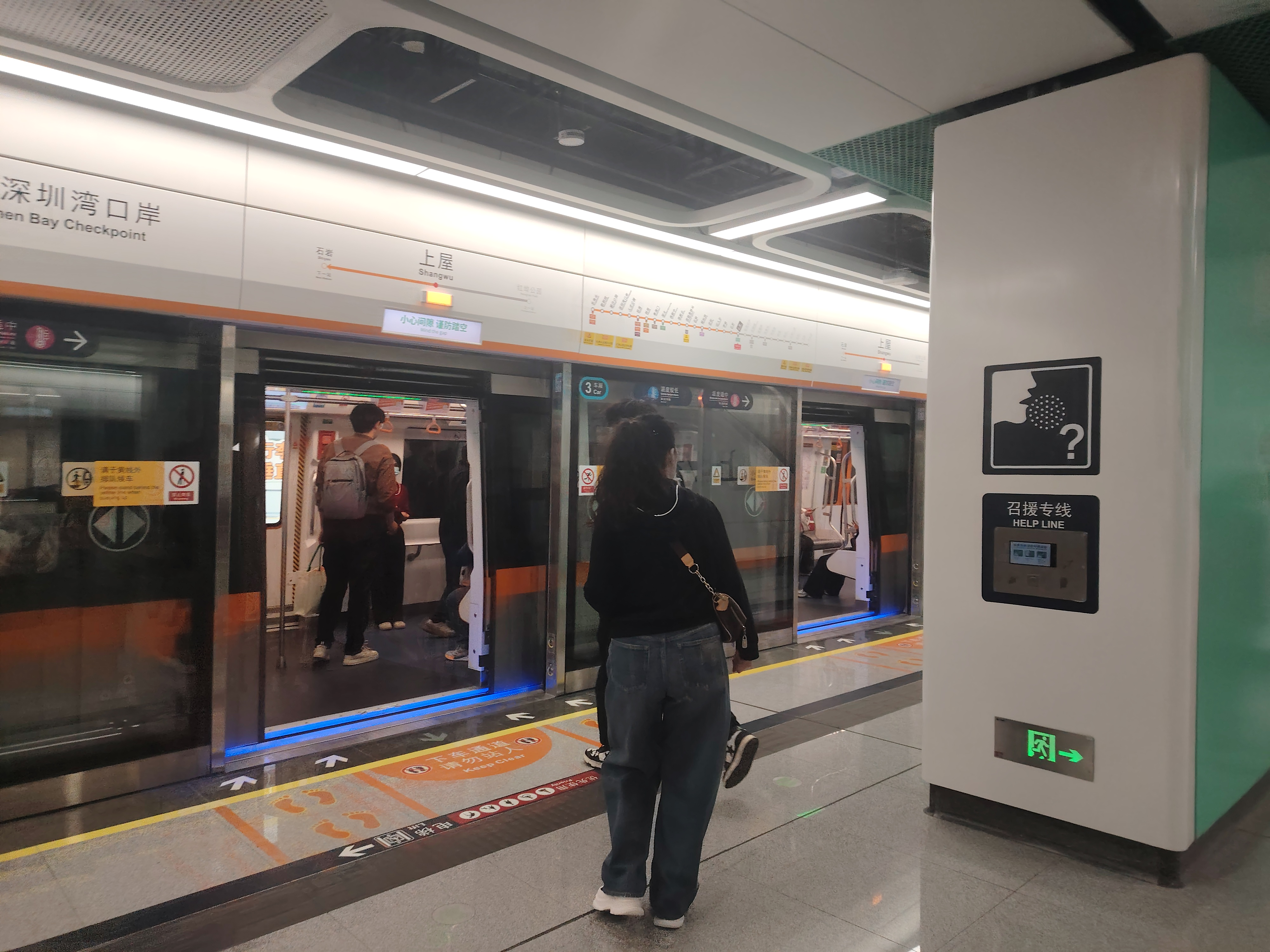
Line 13 platform

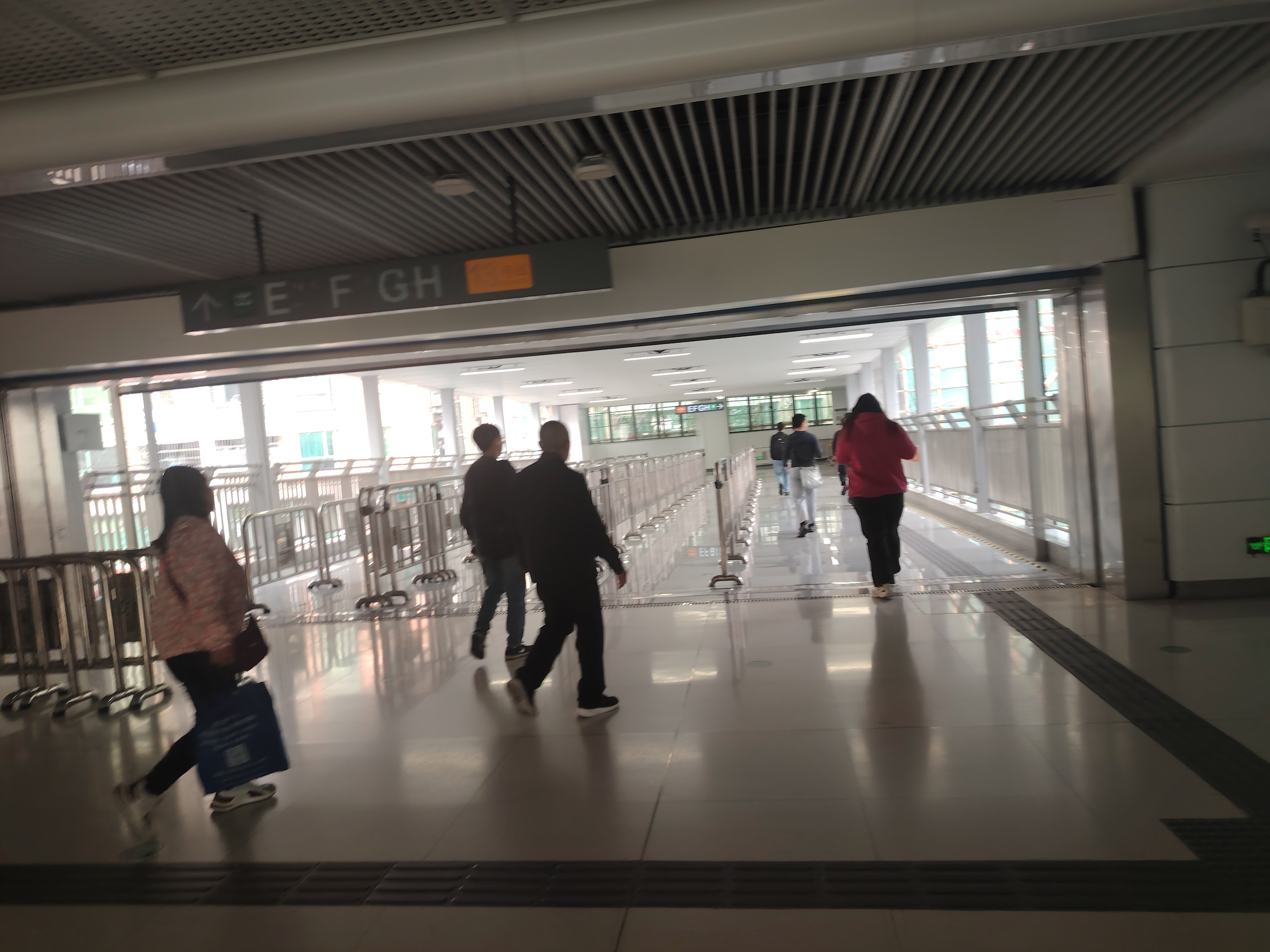
Transfer passage

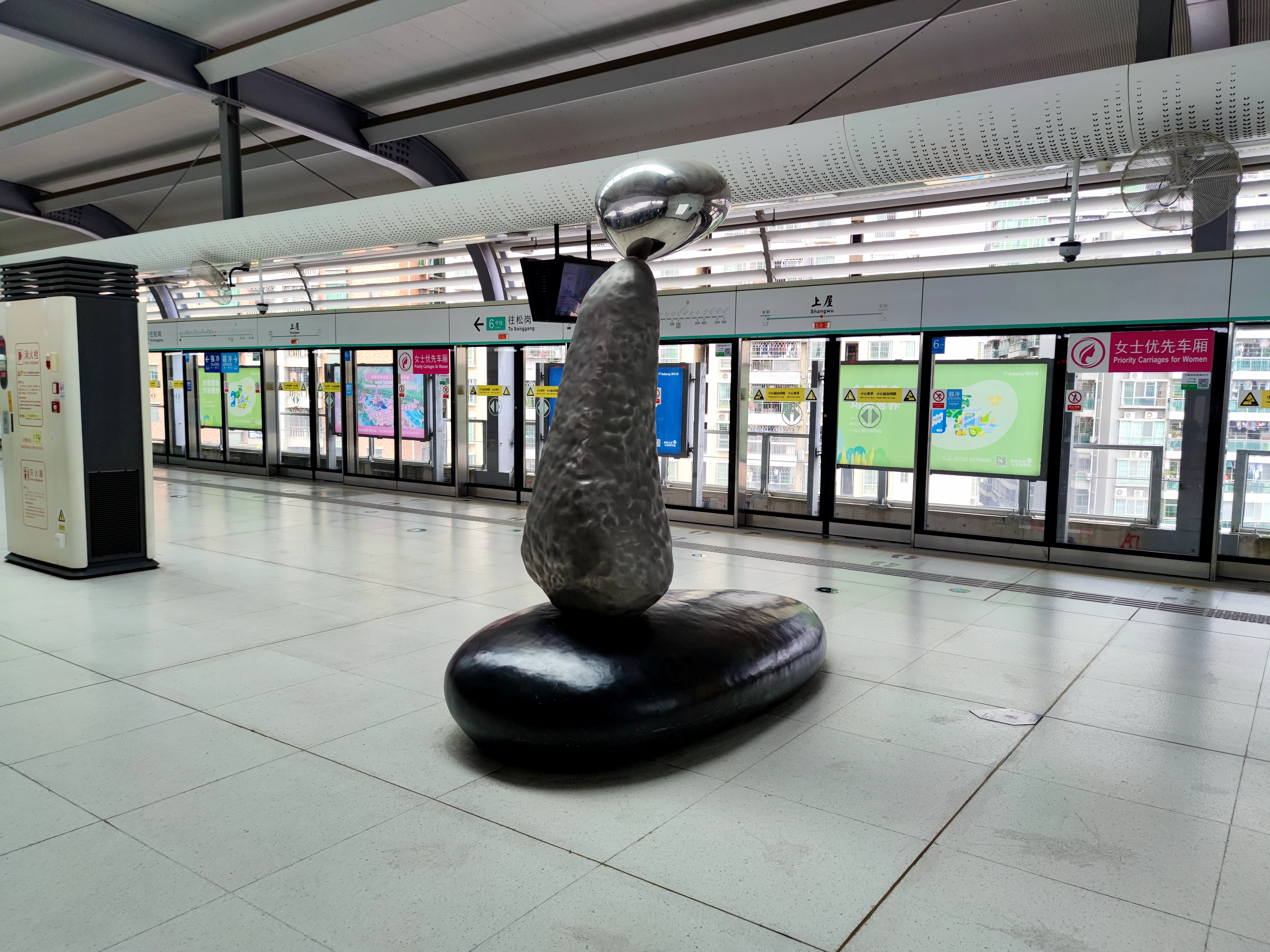
Line 6 platform art installation ("Three Lives on the Stone" - Artist: Weicai Chen [陈伟才])

=== Entrances/exits ===
The station has 8 points of entry/exit. Exits B, D, F and H are equipped with elevators. There was also a reserved Exit A, but this was replaced by the transfer passage between the two lines.

- : Shiyan North Ring Road (N-W), Shangwu Avenue (E-N), Shiyan Management Station, Shiyan Mansion of Shenzhen Social Insurance Fund Administration
- (escalator only): Shiyan North Ring Road (S-W), Shangwu Avenue (E-S), Shenzhen Shangwu Primary School
- : Shiyan North Ring Road (S-E), Tianxin Avenue (W-S), Shenzhen Shangwu Primary School
- :
- :
- :
- :
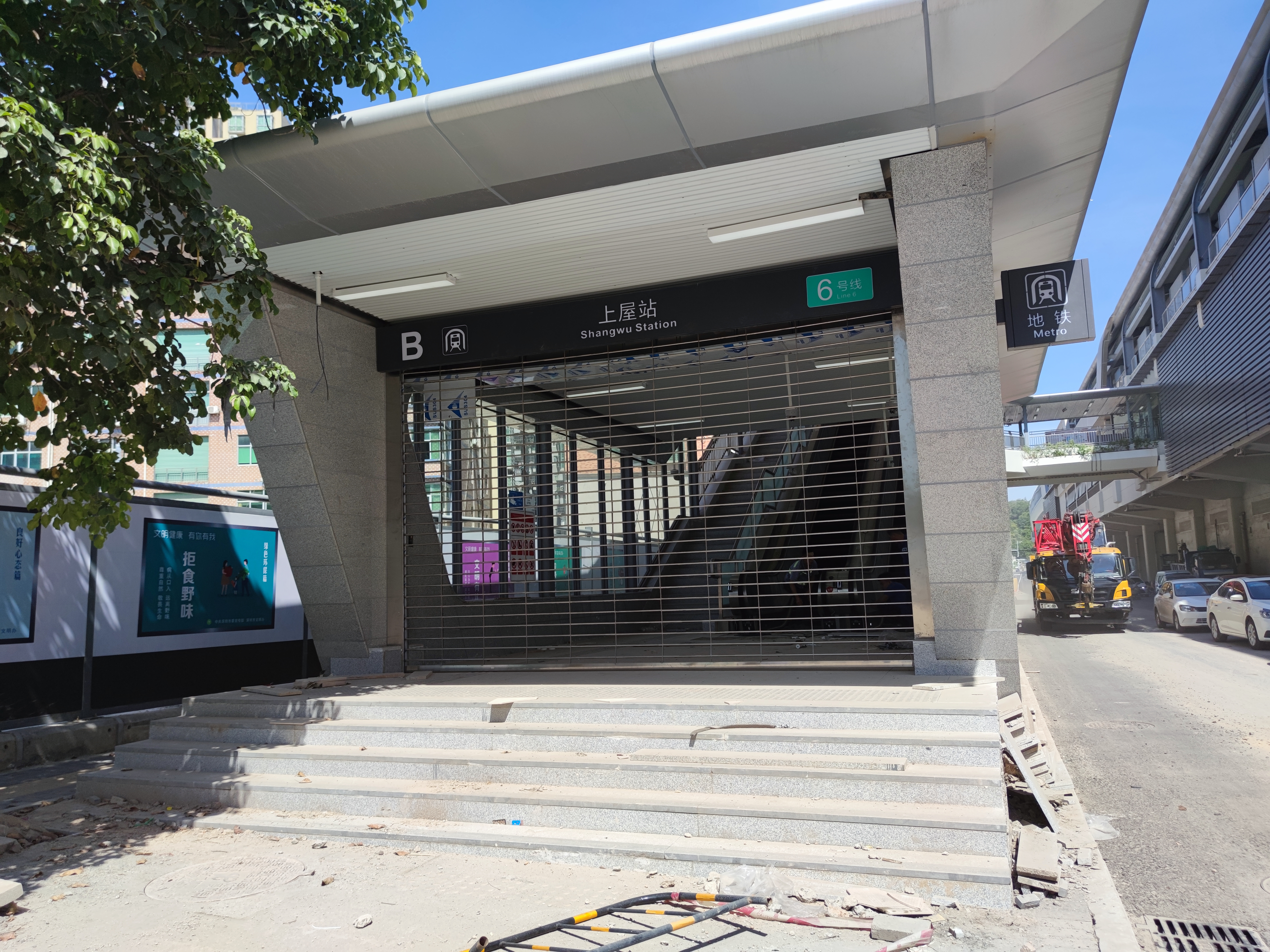
Entrance B

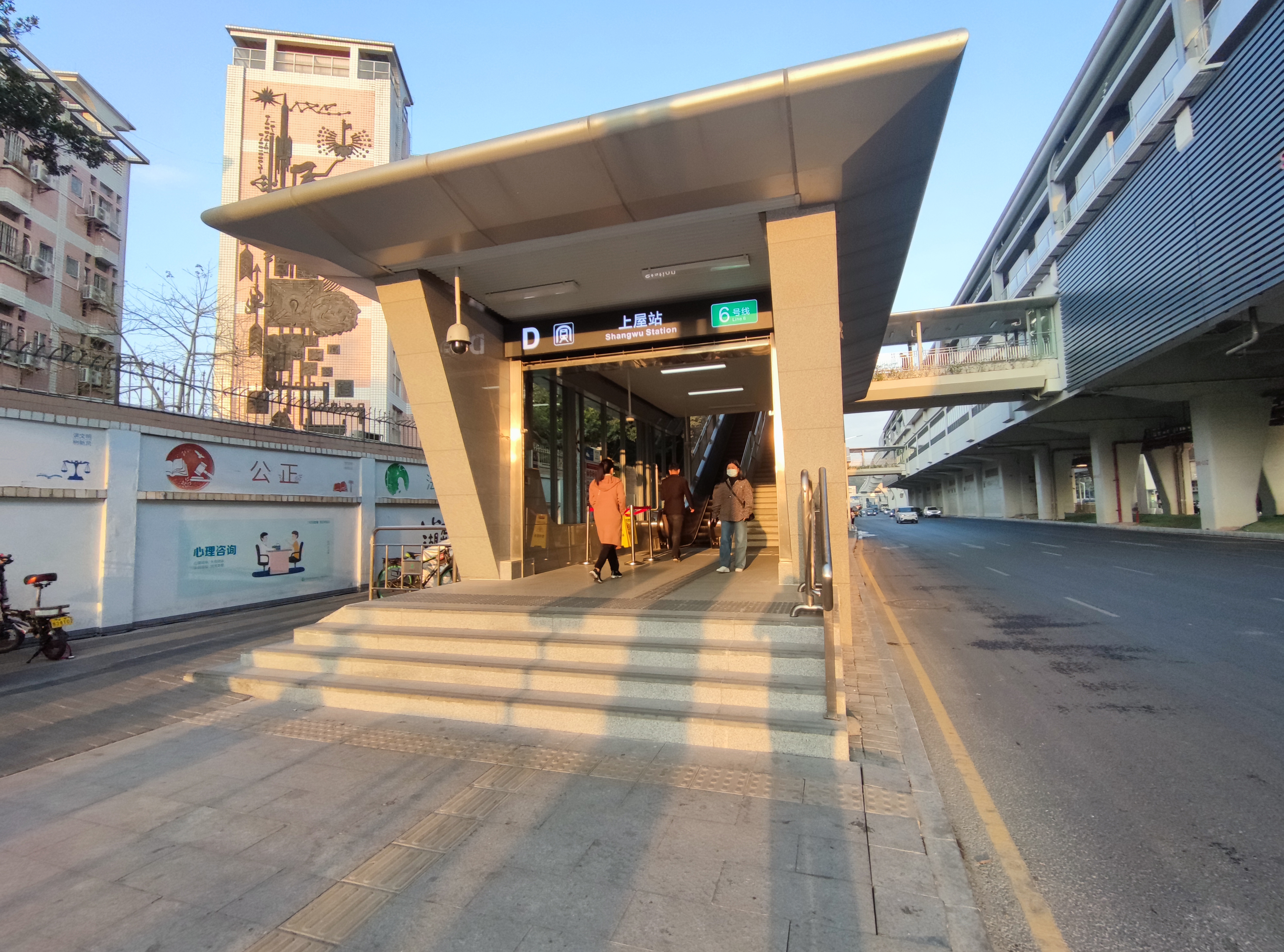
Entrance D

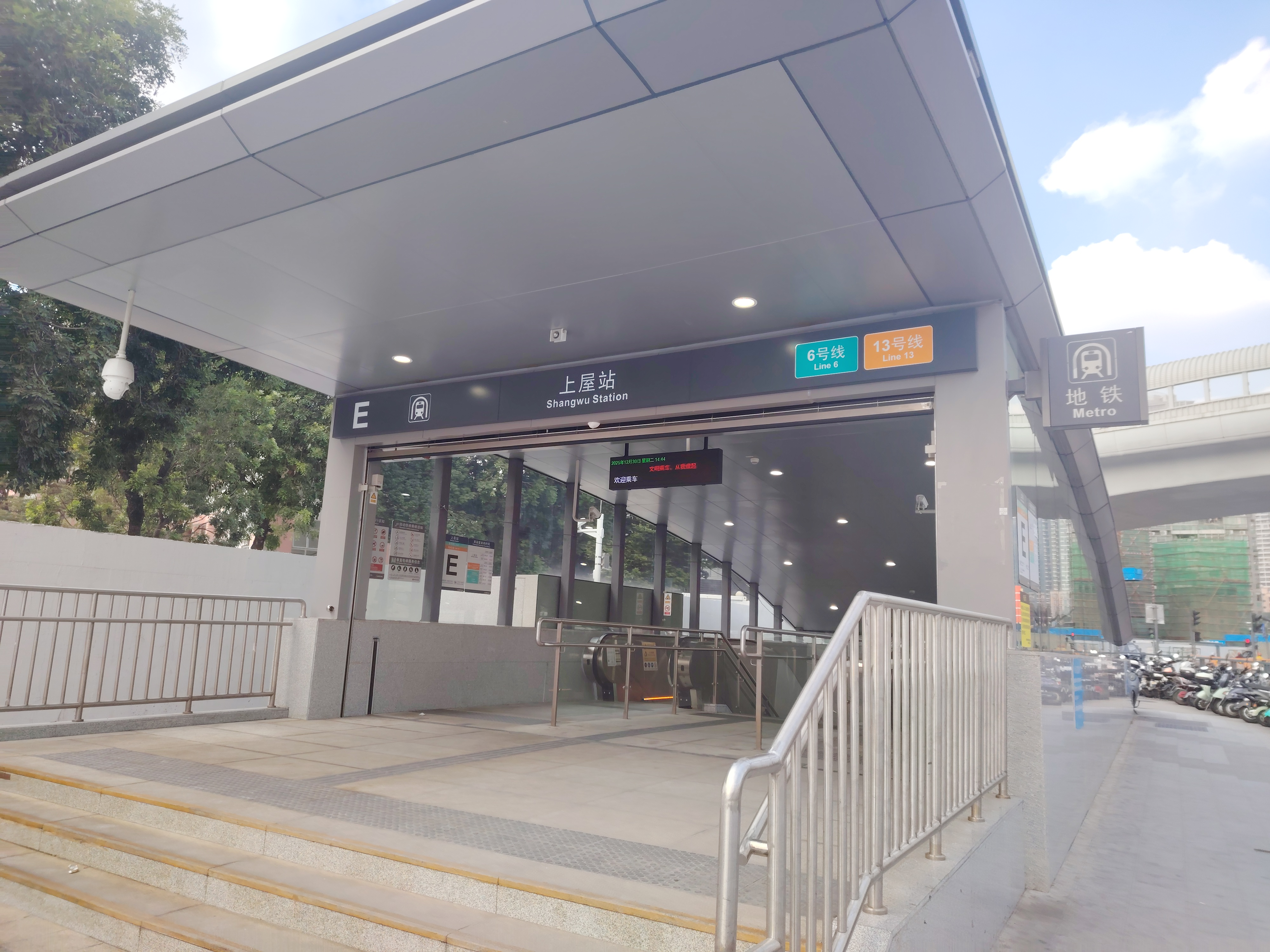
Entrance E

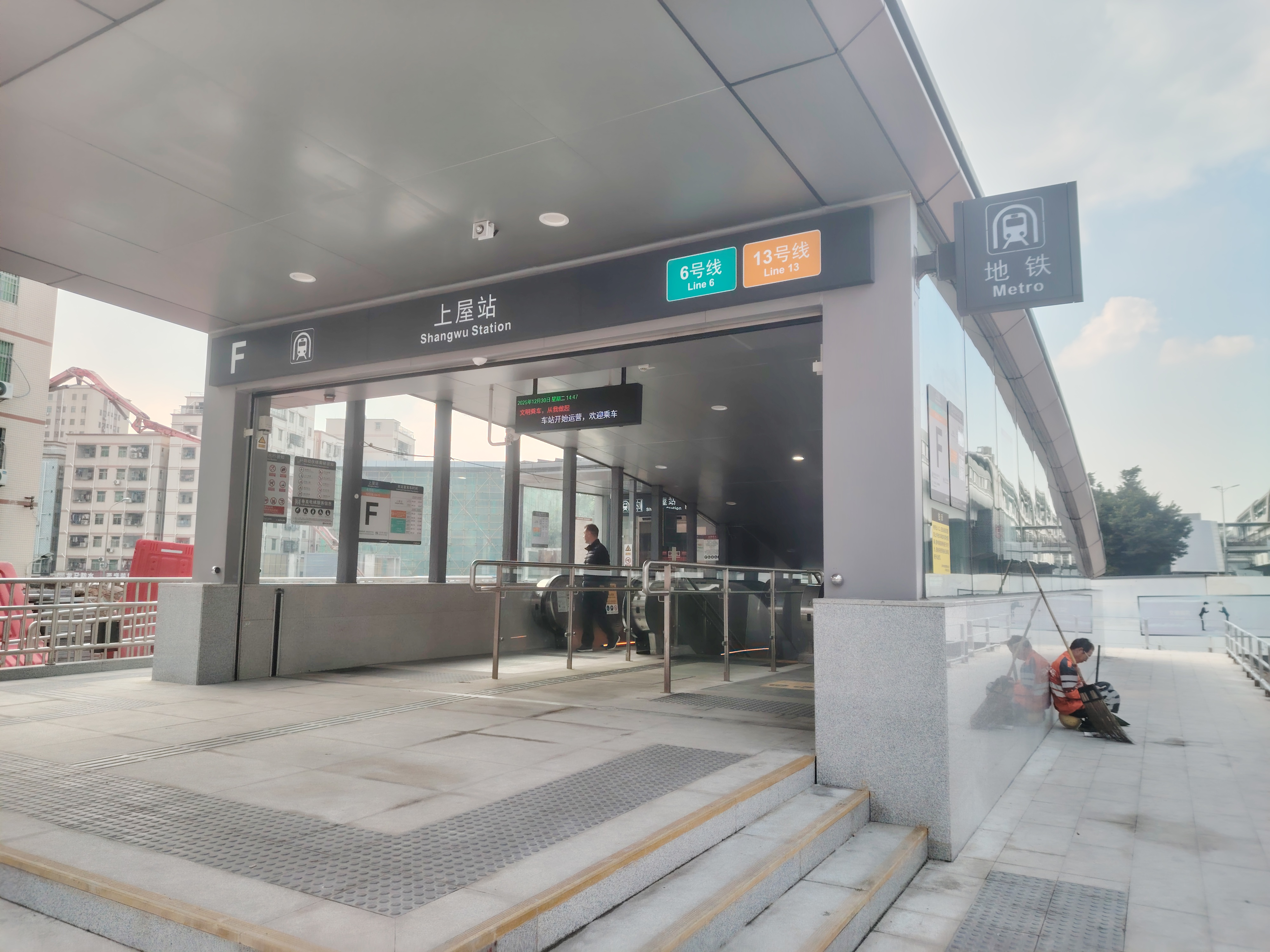
Entrance F

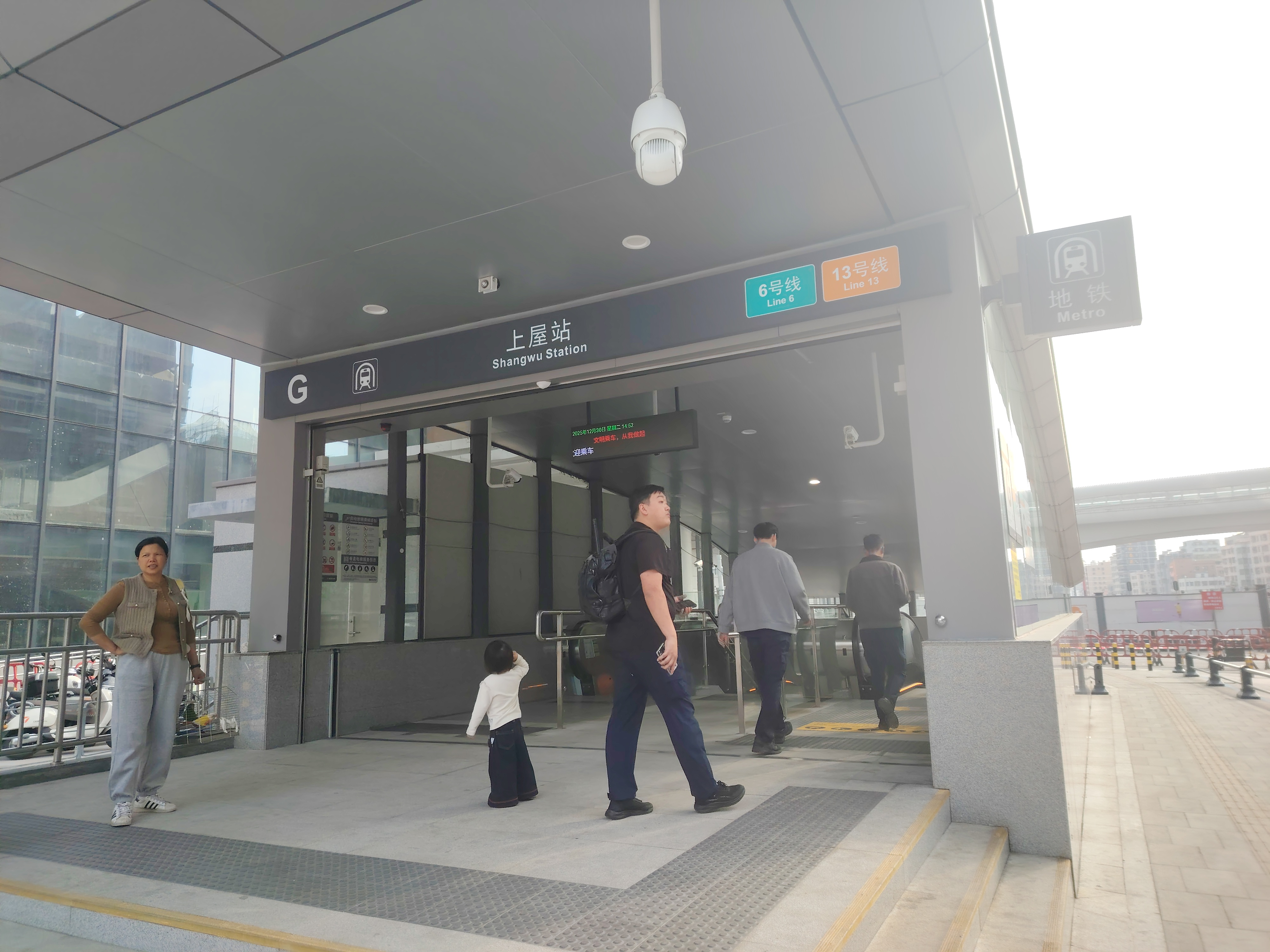
Entrance G

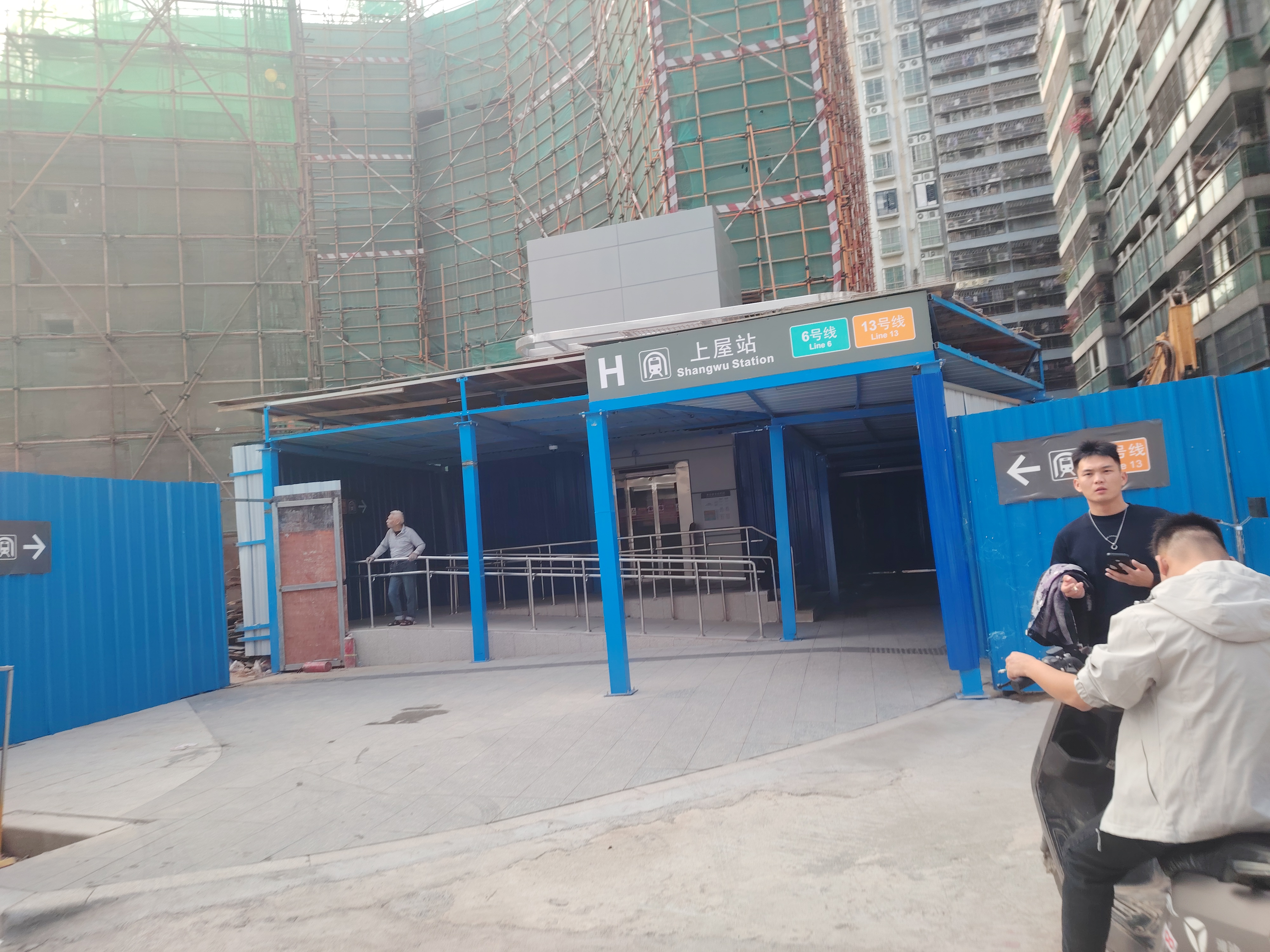
Entrance H

== History ==
The station has appeared together with Line 6 in the "Preliminary Plan for the Location of Rail Transit Recent Construction Line Routes" proposed on 9 July 2007, which was called Tianxin station at that time, but the direction in the "Plan" was north-south, while the current station of Line 6 is east-west.

On 30 May 2011, the construction plan of the third phase of Shenzhen rail transit (2011-2016) was approved, including this station, and the project was named Shangwu North station.

On 23 November 2016, the Shenzhen Municipal Commission of Planning and Land Resources issued the "Shenzhen Rail Phase III and Phase III Adjustment of Relevant Line Station Name Plan", which was approved on 15 May 2017. In the plan, this station was renamed Shangwu station on the grounds that the station was located north of Shangwu Village, but there was no station named or planned as "Shangwu", so there was no need to add the azimuth word "north".

On 18 August 2020, this station was opened together with Shenzhen Metro Line 6.

On 28 December 2025, the station officially opened along with the new stations of Line 13's Phase 1 North Section (except Xili HSR station).
