= Bao'an Passenger Transport Terminal station =

Shenzhen Metro Line 12 station

Bao'an Passenger Transport Terminal 宝安客运站
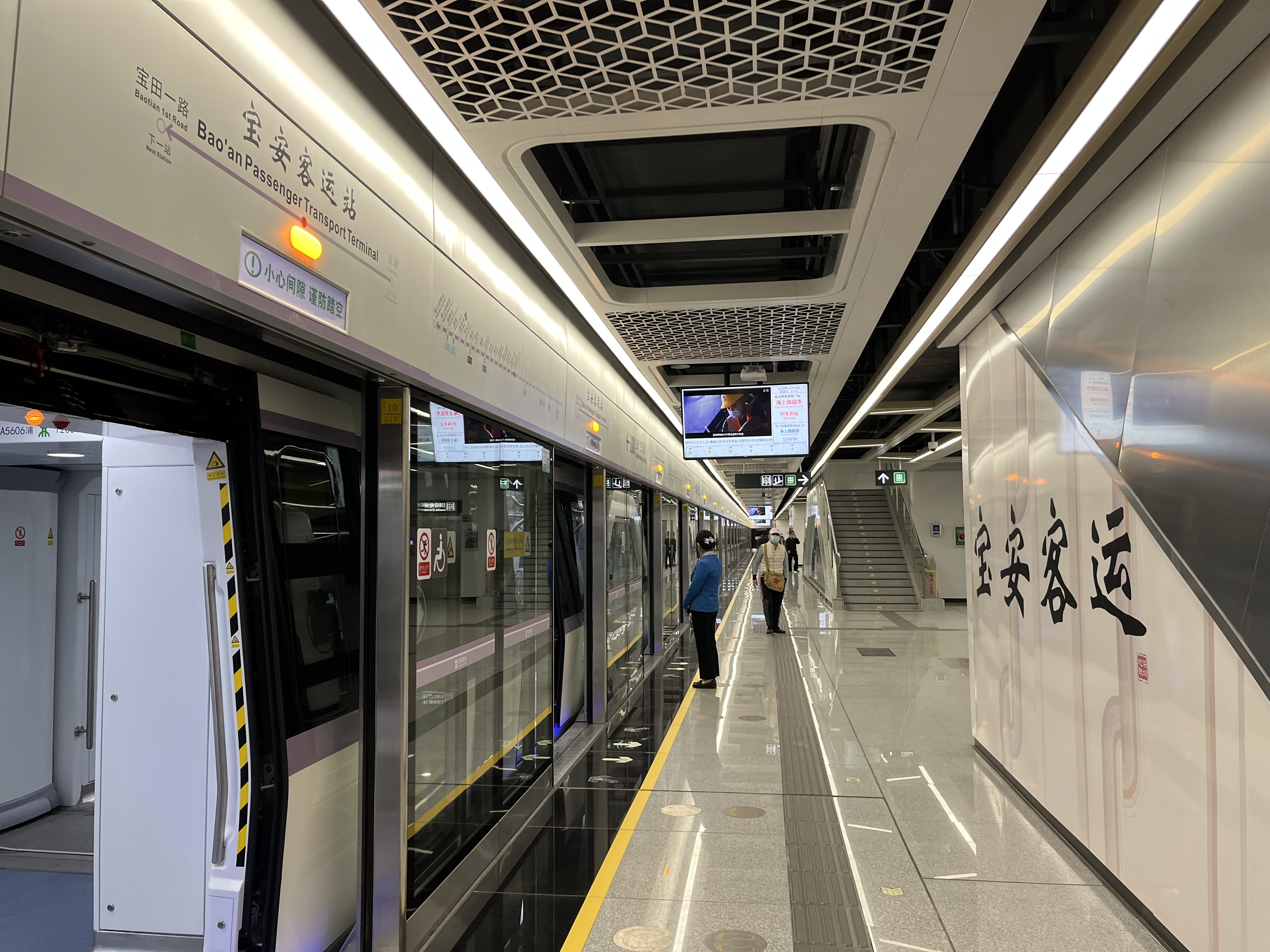
- Platform

Chinese name
- Traditional Chinese: 寶安客運站
- Simplified Chinese: 宝安客运站
Transcriptions
Standard Mandarin
- Hanyu Pinyin: Bǎoān Kèyùnzhàn
Yue: Cantonese
- Yale Romanization: Bóu'ōn Haak'wahnjaahm
- Jyutping: Bou2 On1 Haak3 Wan6 Zaam6

General information
- Location: Intersection of Qianjin 2nd Road and Xixiang Avenue; Bao'an District, Shenzhen, Guangdong; China
- Coordinates: 22°35′32.35″N 113°52′44.26″E
- Operated by: Shenzhen Line 12 Rail Transit Co., Ltd (Shenzhen Metro Group and PowerChina PPP)
- Line: Line 12
- Platforms: 2 (1 island platform)
- Tracks: 2

Construction
- Structure type: Underground
- Accessible: Yes

History
- Opened: 28 November 2022 (3 years ago)

Services
Preceding station	Shenzhen Metro	Following station
Baotian 1st Road towards Songgang	Line 12	Liutang towards Zuopaotai East
Location

Bao'an Passenger Transport Terminal station (simplified Chinese: 宝安客运站; traditional Chinese: 寶安客運站; pinyin: Bǎoān Kèyùnzhàn; Cantonese Yale: Bóu'ōn Haak'wahnjaahm) is a metro station on Line 12 of Shenzhen Metro. It opened on 28 November 2022.

== Station layout ==
The station has an island platform under Qianjin 2nd Road.

G	–	Exits A-D
B1F; Concourse	Lobby	Ticket Machines, Customer Service, Automatic Vending Machines
B2F; Platforms	Platform	12 towards Songgang (Baotian 1st Road)
B2F; Platforms	Island platform, doors will open on the left
B2F; Platforms	Platform	12 towards Zuopaotai East (Liutang)

=== Entrances/exits ===
The station has 4 points of entry/exit.

Exit	Destination
Exit A	Qianjin 2nd Road (E), Lijing City, Juncheng Yonghe Garden, Xingzhuang Park Community
Exit B	Xixiang Avenue (N), Mingdian Business Hotel
Exit C	Xixiang Avenue (N), Jiexin Park, Rainbow City, Jinbi Experimental School
Exit D	Qianjin 2nd Road (W), Bao'an Transportation Group, Yulong House, COFCO Lanshan

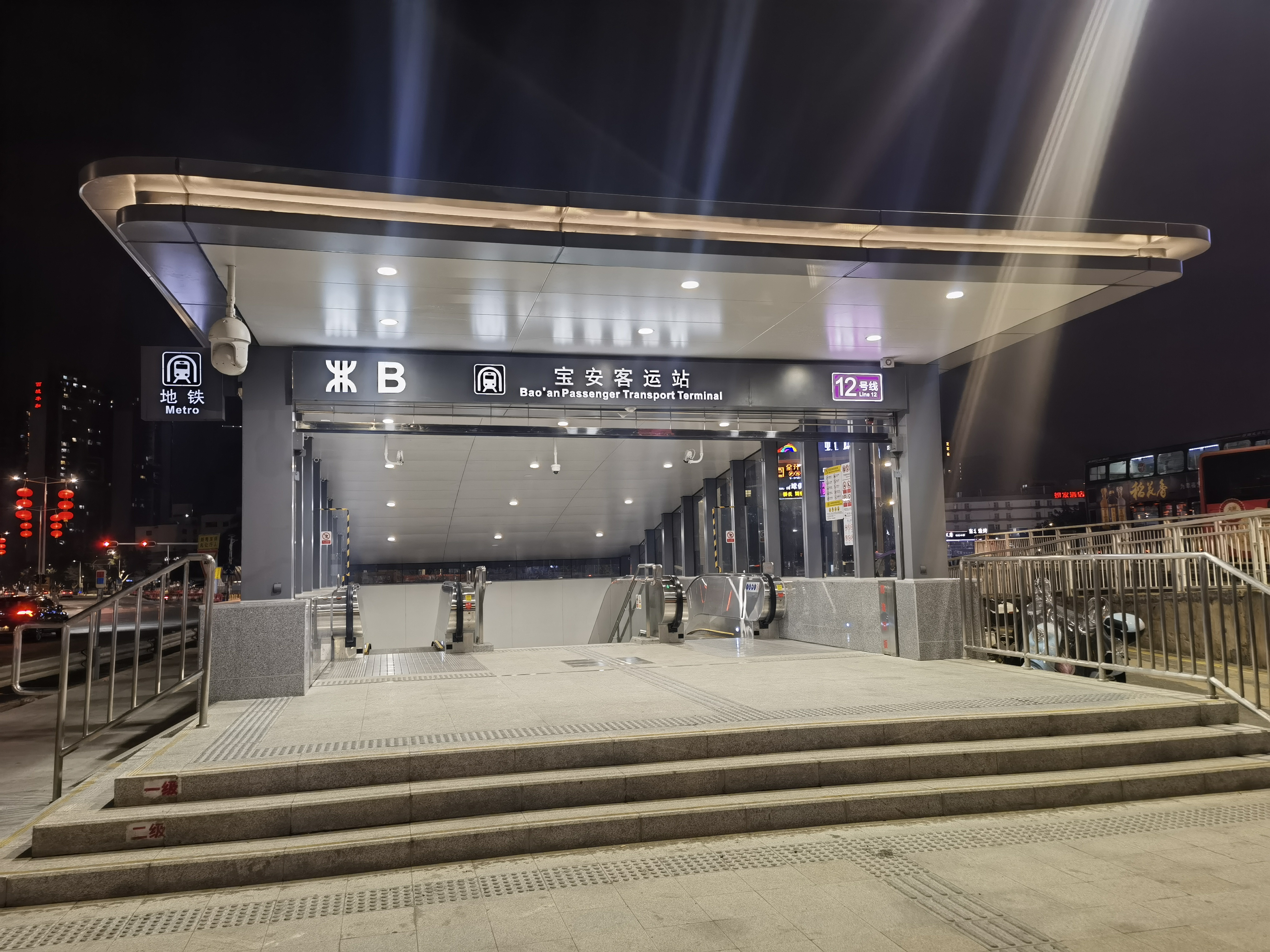
Entrance B

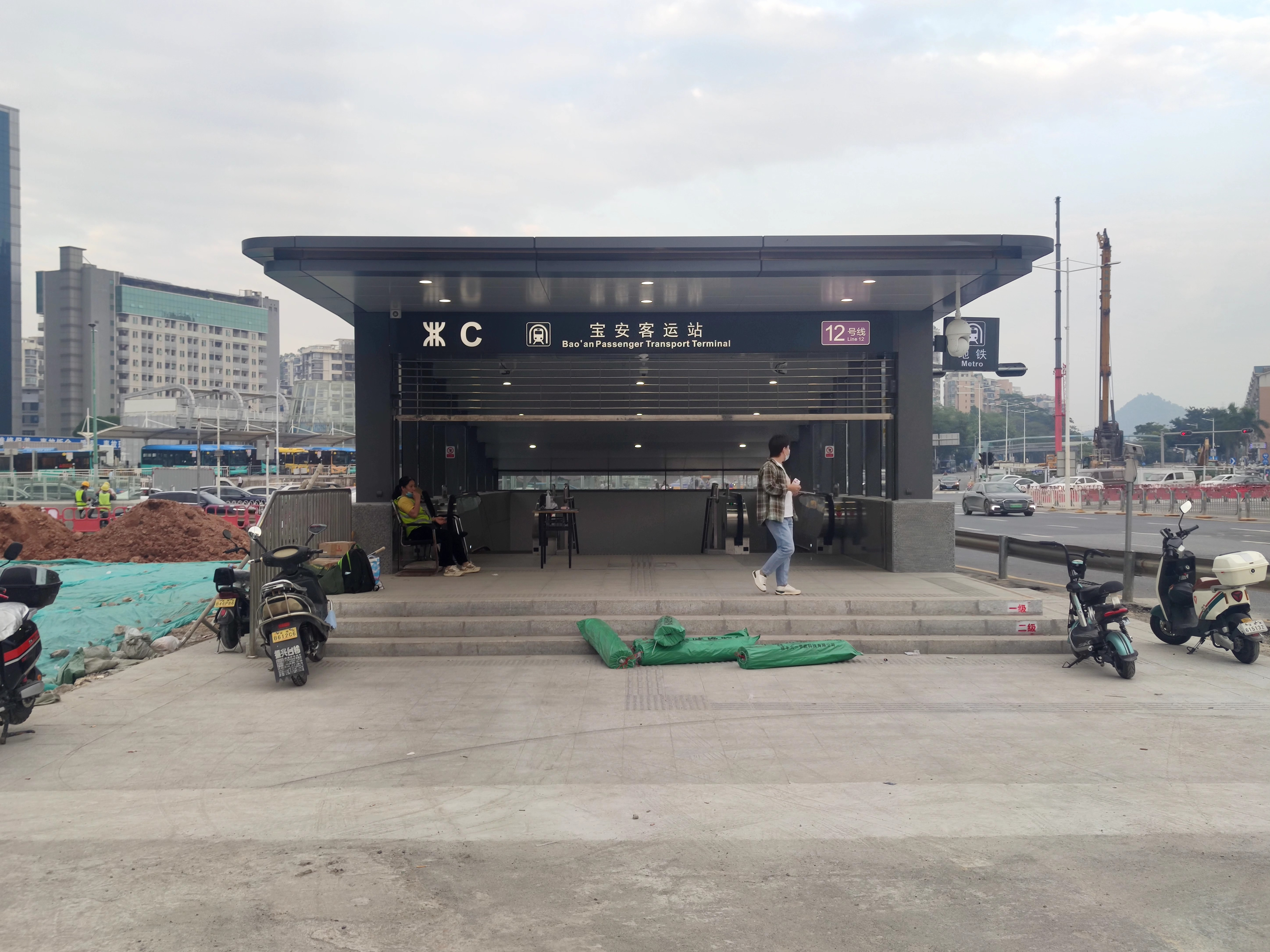
Entrance C

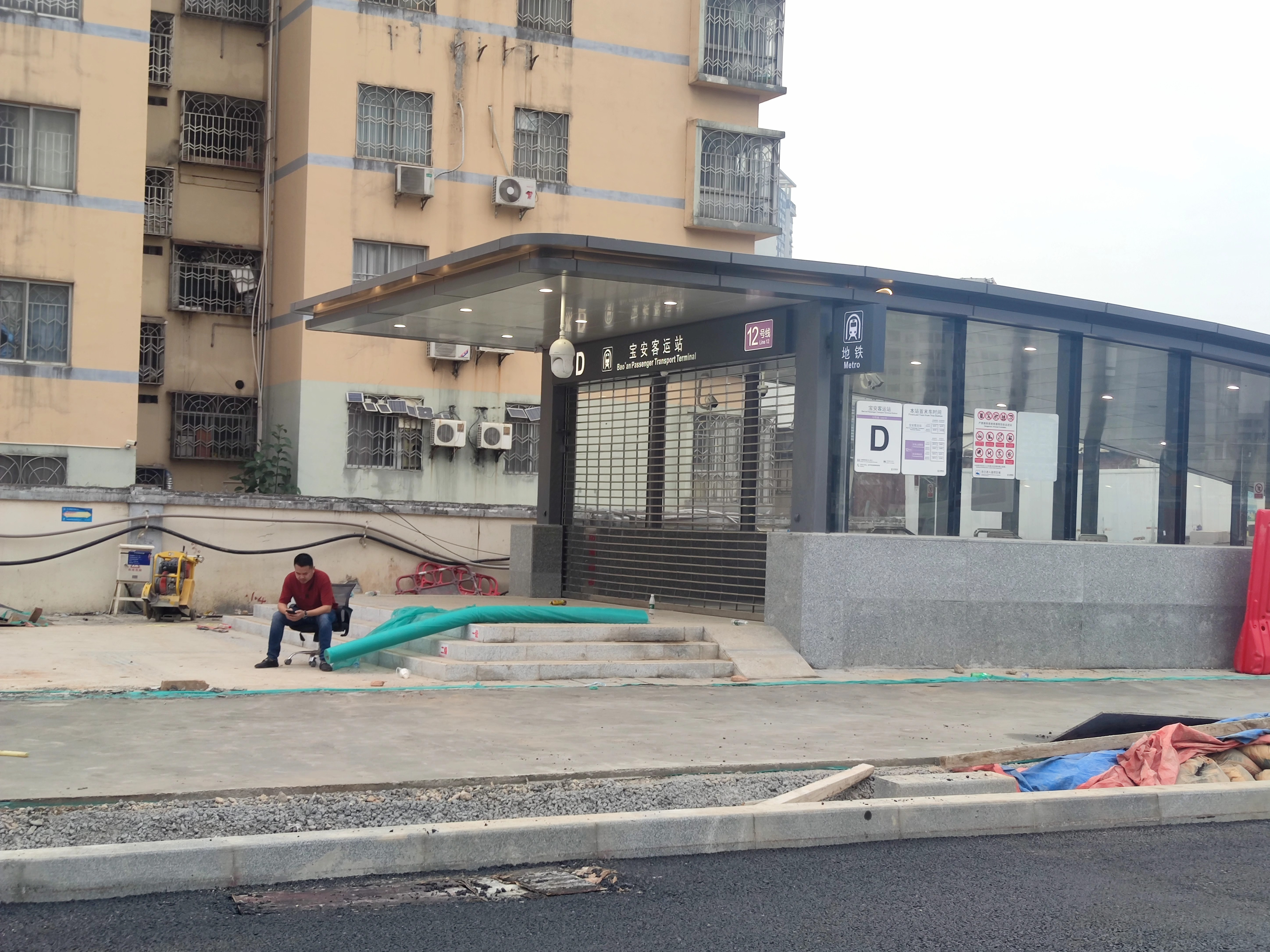
Entrance D
