= Baotian 1st Road station =

Shenzhen Metro Line 12 station

Baotian 1st Road 宝田一路
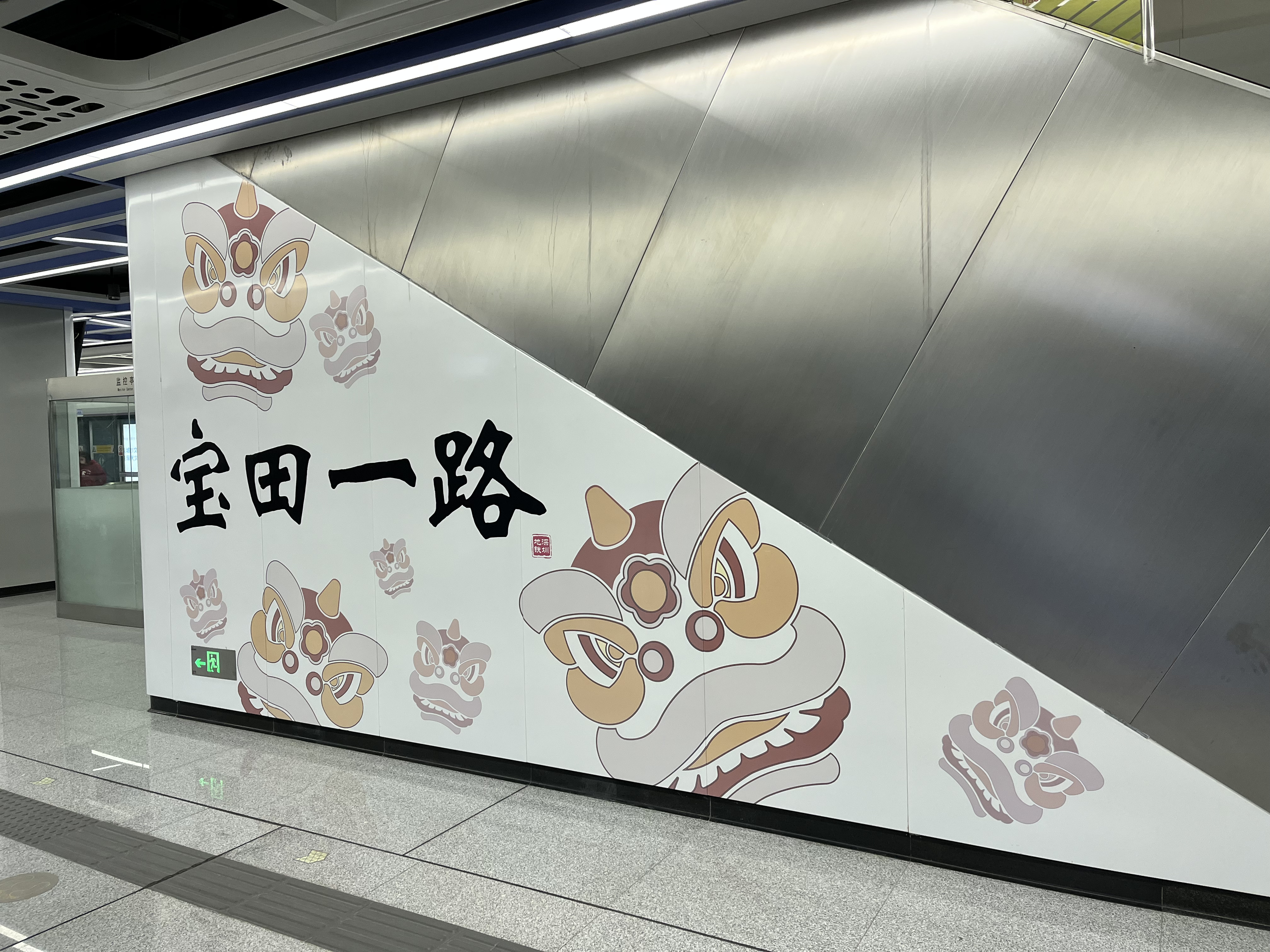
- Calligraphy

Chinese name
- Traditional Chinese: 寶田一路
- Simplified Chinese: 宝田一路
Transcriptions
Standard Mandarin
- Hanyu Pinyin: Bǎotián Yīlù
Yue: Cantonese
- Yale Romanization: Bóutìn Yātlǒu
- Jyutping: Bou2 Tin4 Jat1 Lou6

General information
- Location: Intersection of Qianjin 2nd Road and Baotian 1st Road; Bao'an District, Shenzhen, Guangdong; China
- Coordinates: 22°35′51.43″N 113°52′24.78″E
- Operator: Shenzhen Line 12 Rail Transit Co., Ltd (Shenzhen Metro Group and PowerChina PPP)
- Line: Line 12
- Platforms: 2 (1 island platform)
- Tracks: 2

Construction
- Structure type: Underground
- Accessible: Yes

History
- Opened: 28 November 2022 (3 years ago)

Services
Preceding station	Shenzhen Metro	Following station
Pingluan Hill towards Songgang	Line 12	Bao'an Passenger Transport Terminal towards Zuopaotai East
Location

Baotian 1st Road station (simplified Chinese: 宝田一路站; traditional Chinese: 寶田一路站; pinyin: Bǎotián Yīlù Zhàn; Cantonese Yale: Bóutìn Yātlǒu Jaahm) is a metro station on Line 12 of Shenzhen Metro. It opened on 28 November 2022.

== Station layout ==
The station has an island platform under Qianjin 2nd Road.

G	–	Exits A-C
B1F; Concourse	Lobby	Ticket Machines, Customer Service, Automatic Vending Machines
B2F; Platforms	Platform	12 towards Songgang (Pingluan Hill)
B2F; Platforms	Island platform, doors will open on the left
B2F; Platforms	Platform	12 towards Zuopaotai East (Bao'an Passenger Transport Terminal)

=== Entrances/exits ===
The station has 3 points of entry/exit.

Exit	Destination
Exit A	Baotian 1st Road (S), Hailuan Place
Exit B	Qianjin 2nd Road (W), Liutang Police Station
Exit C	Qianjin 2nd Road (W), Dunxilu International Hotel, Shenzhen

== Gallery ==
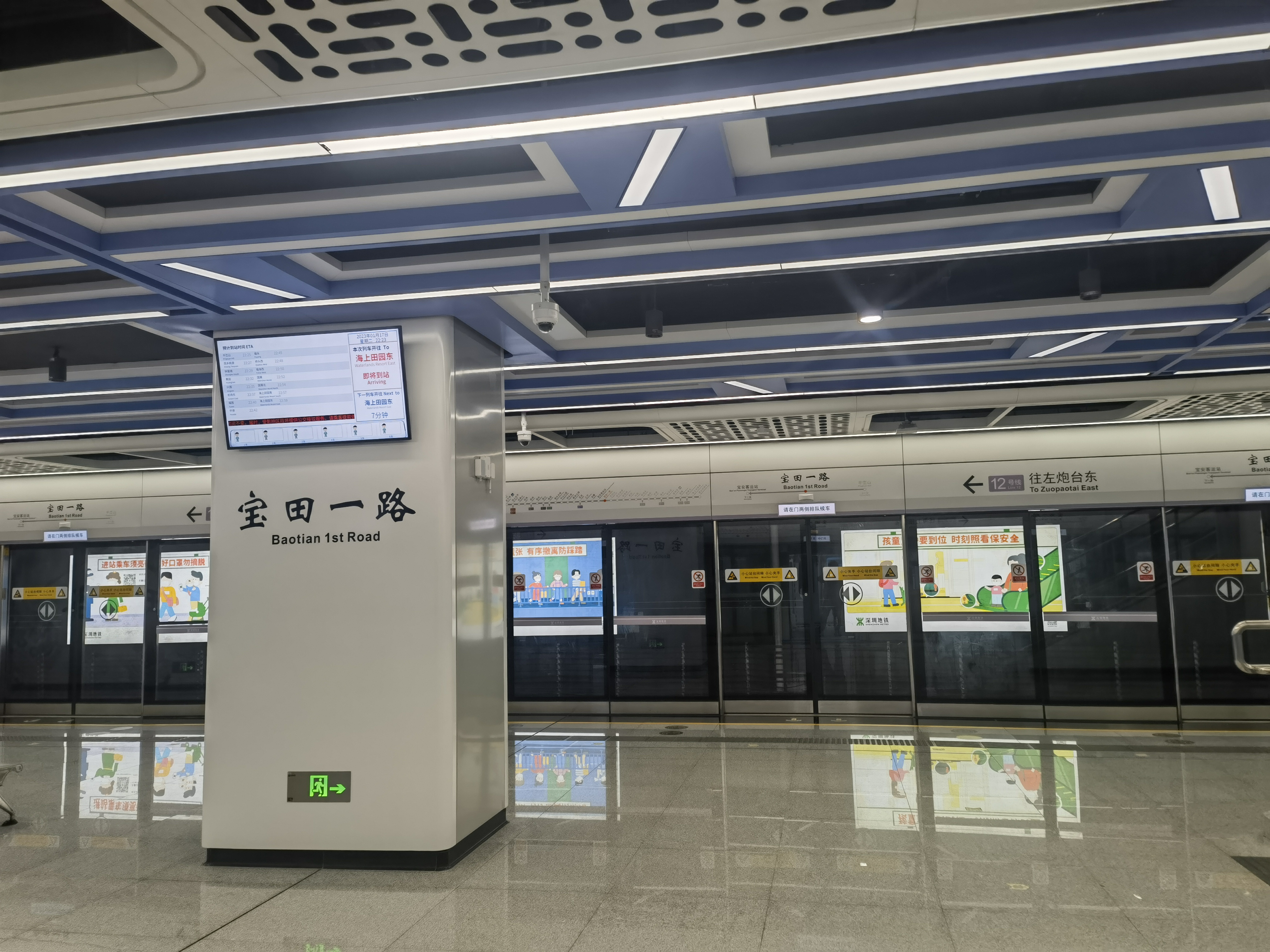
Platform

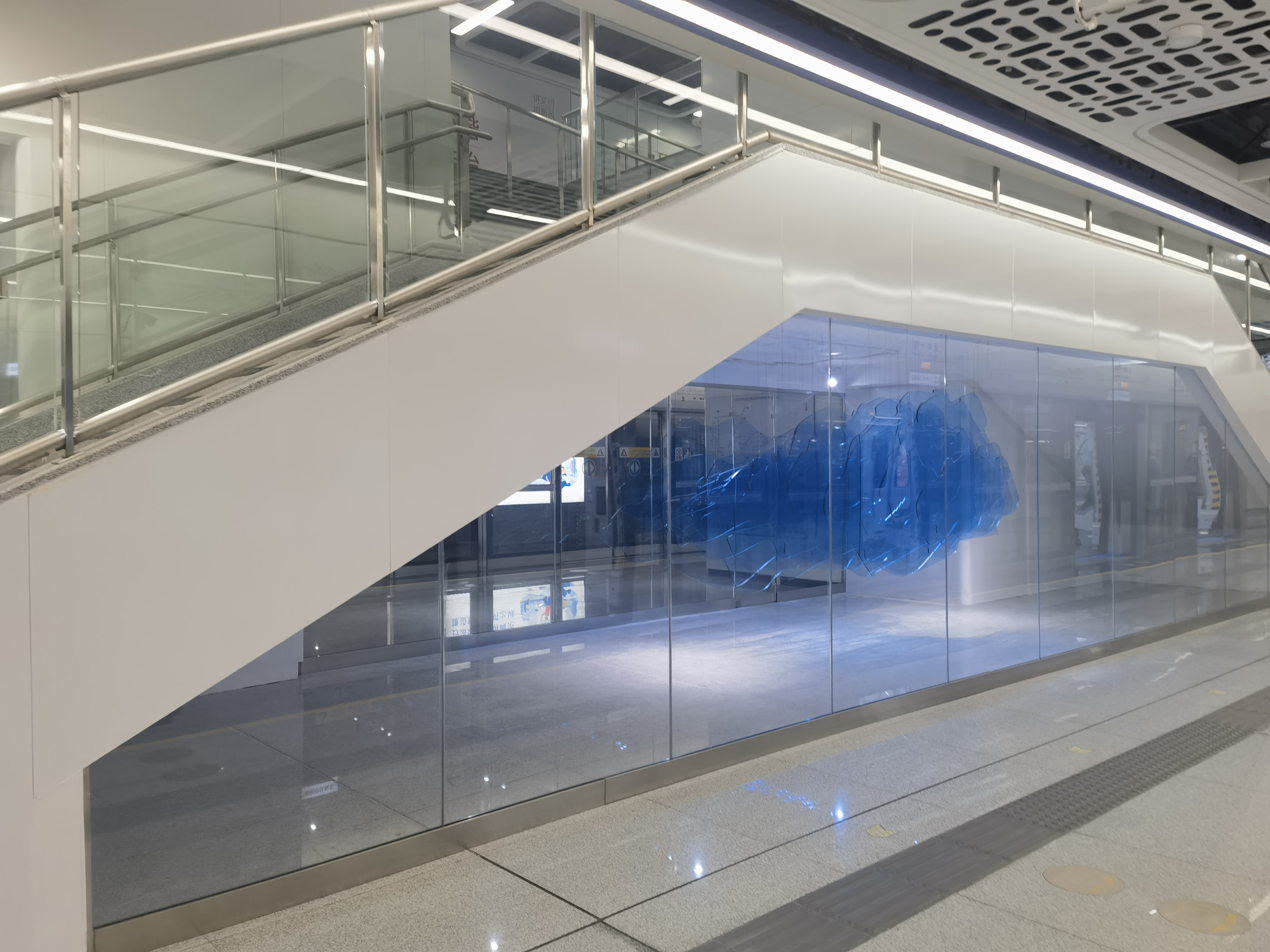
Platform art

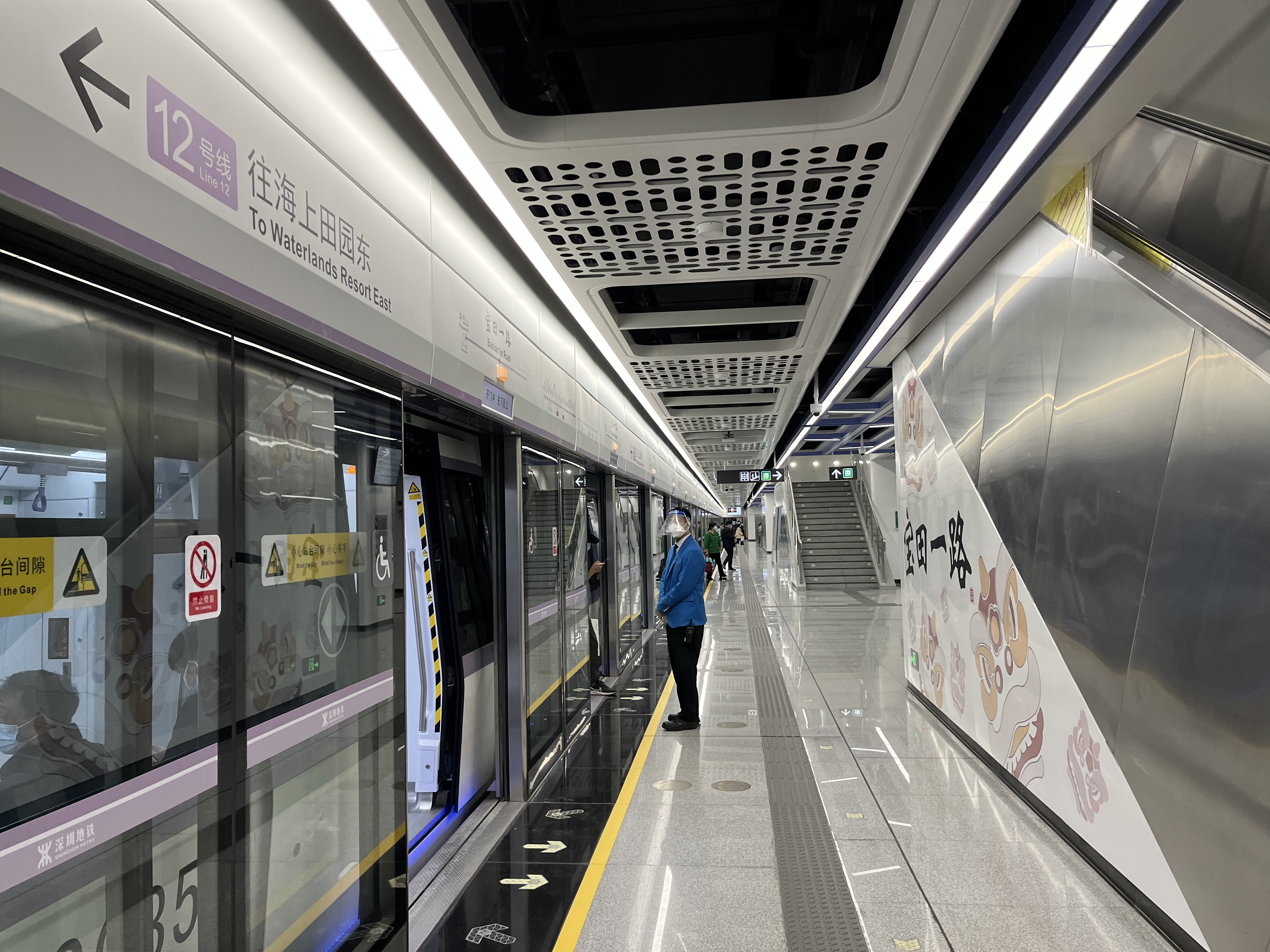
Platform towards Songgang
