= Shangchuan station =

Shenzhen Metro Line 12 station

Shangchuan 上川
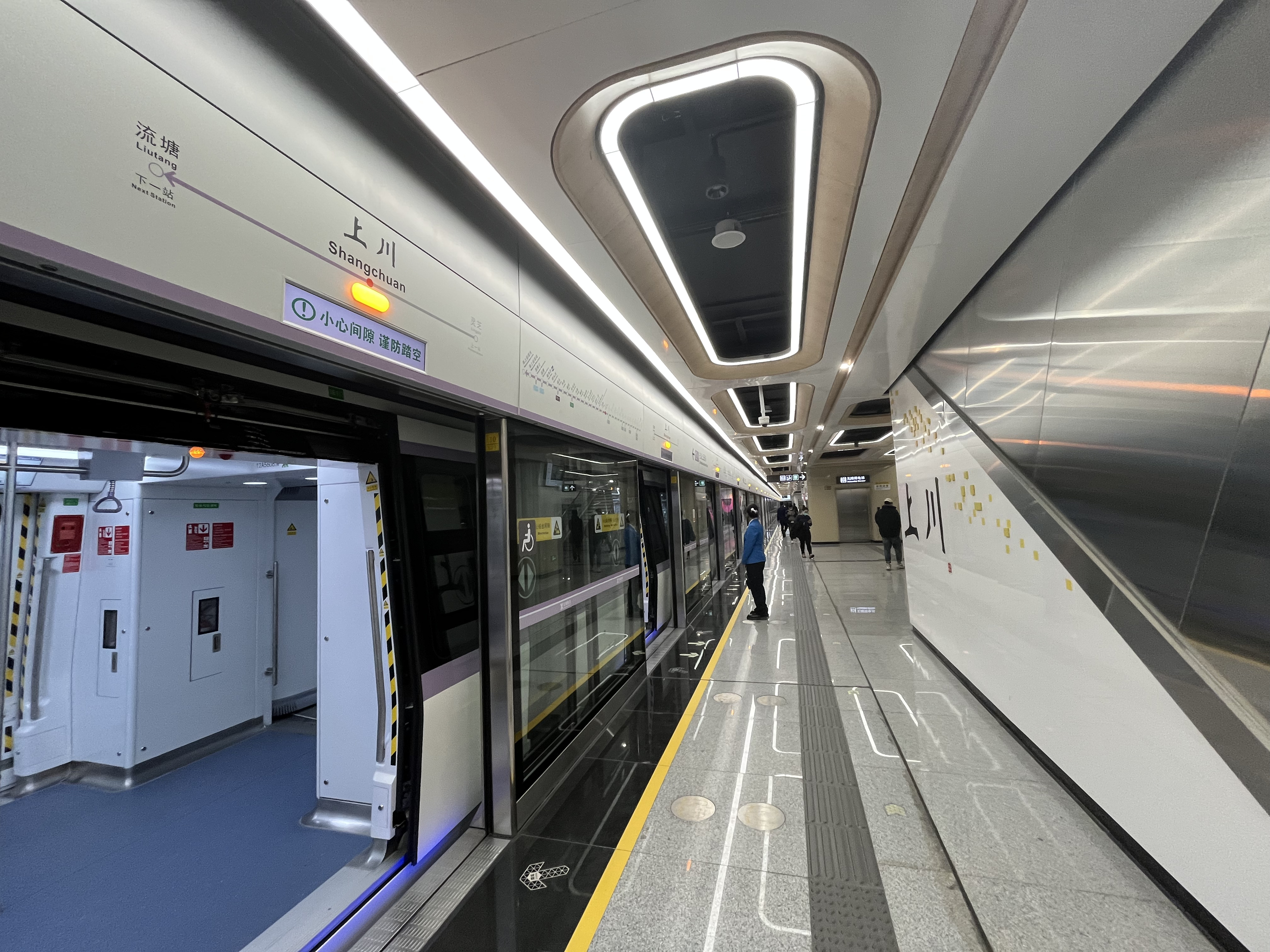
- Platform 2

Chinese name
- Chinese: 上川
Transcriptions
Standard Mandarin
- Hanyu Pinyin: Shàngchuān
Yue: Cantonese
- Yale Romanization: Seuhngchyūn
- Jyutping: Seung6 Chyun1

General information
- Location: North of the intersection of Qianjin 1st Road and Shangchuan Road; Bao'an District, Shenzhen, Guangdong; China
- Coordinates: 22°34′47″N 113°53′29″E
- Operator: Shenzhen Line 12 Rail Transit Co., Ltd (Shenzhen Metro Group and PowerChina PPP)
- Line: Line 12
- Platforms: 2 (1 island platform)
- Tracks: 2

Construction
- Structure type: Underground
- Accessible: Yes

History
- Opened: 28 November 2022 (3 years ago)

Services
Preceding station	Shenzhen Metro	Following station
Liutang towards Songgang	Line 12	Lingzhi towards Zuopaotai East
Location

Shangchuan station (Chinese: 上川站; pinyin: Shàngchuān Zhàn; Cantonese Yale: Seuhngchyūn Jaahm) is a metro station on Line 12 of Shenzhen Metro, located at the Xi'an Subdistrict of Bao'an. It was opened on 28 November 2022.

== Station layout ==
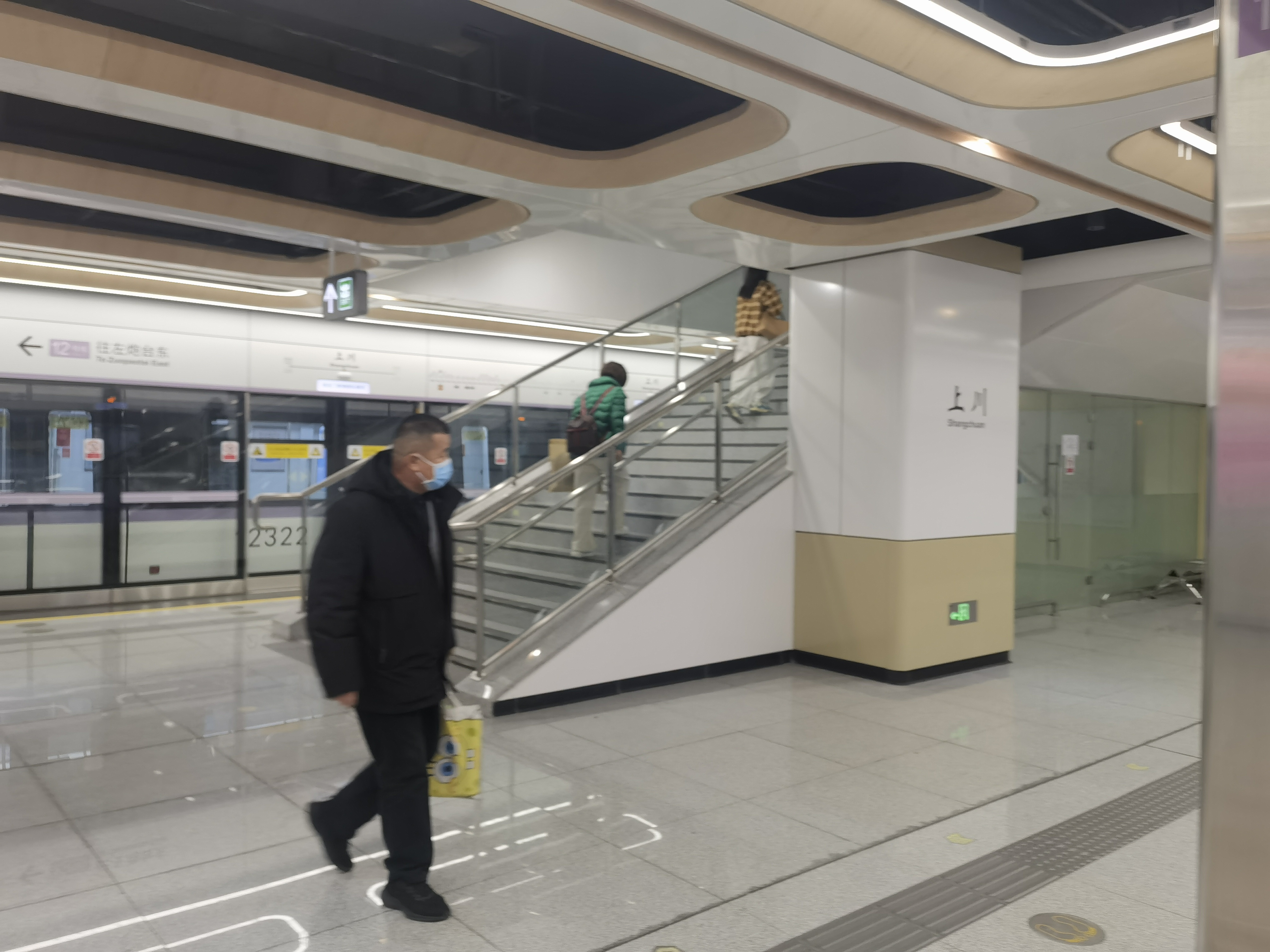
Platforms of Shangchuan station

The station has an island platform under Qianjin 1st Road.

G	–	Exits B-H, J
B1F; Concourse	Lobby	Ticket Machines, Customer Service, Station Control Room
B2F; Platforms	Platform	12 towards Songgang (Liutang)
B2F; Platforms	Island platform, doors will open on the left
B2F; Platforms	Platform	12 towards Zuopaotai East (Lingzhi)

=== Entrances/exits ===
The station has 10 points of entry/exit. When the station first opened, only Exits B1, B2, C and H were opened. Exits B2 and D are accessible via elevators, and Exit E has toilets. Exits E, F1 and F2 are part of the under-street passage. The station has reserved Exits A and I.

Exit	Destination
Exit B1	Fumin Car Repairing Company
Exit B2	Shanghe New Village, Wenhui College
Exit C	Tianhong Shopping Mall
Exit D (not open)	Shenzhen Guotou Mall, Walmart Shopping Center
Exit E (not open)	Bao'an Company
Exit F1 (not open)	Bao'an Cuboid Center, Yaranju Estate, South Gate of Liutang Park
Exit F2 (not open)	Yaranju Estate, Liutang Old Village
Exit G (not open)	Tianhong Shopping Mall
Exit H	Wenhui College, Yashige Estate
Exit J (not open)	Yashige and Jian'an Estates

Exits E, F1 and F2 are open even when services have ended to provide subway connections for residents.

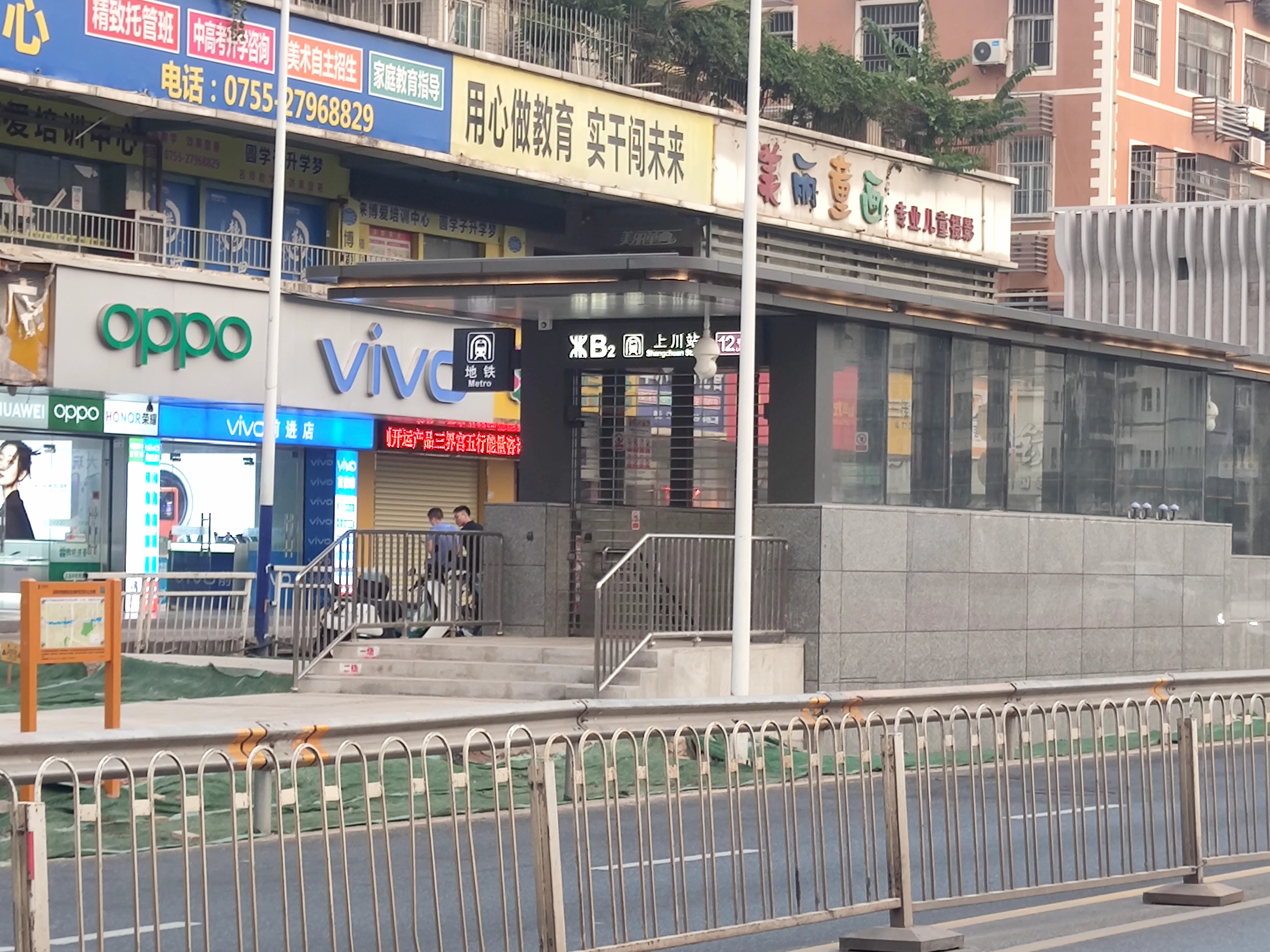
Entrance B2

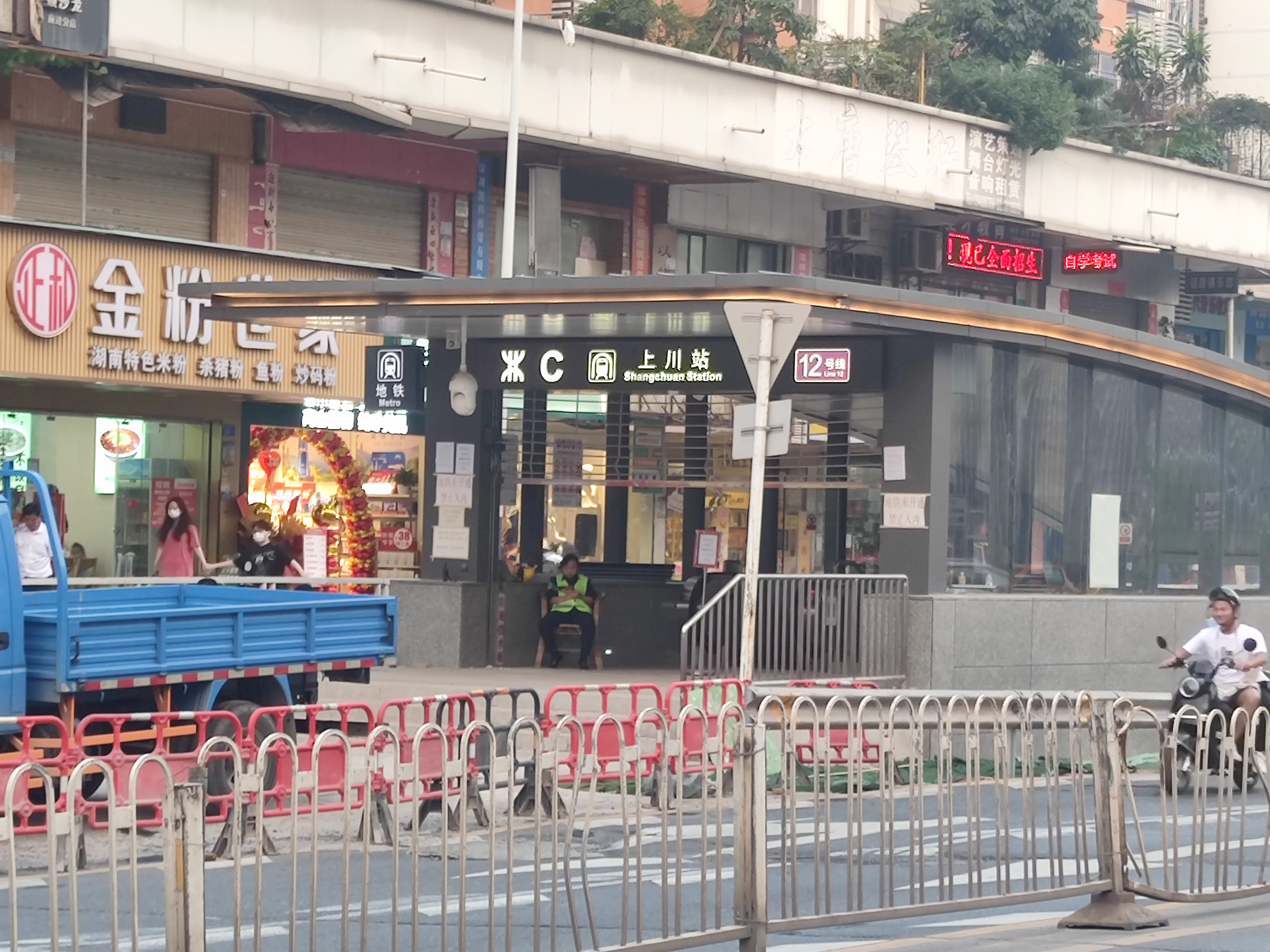
Entrance C

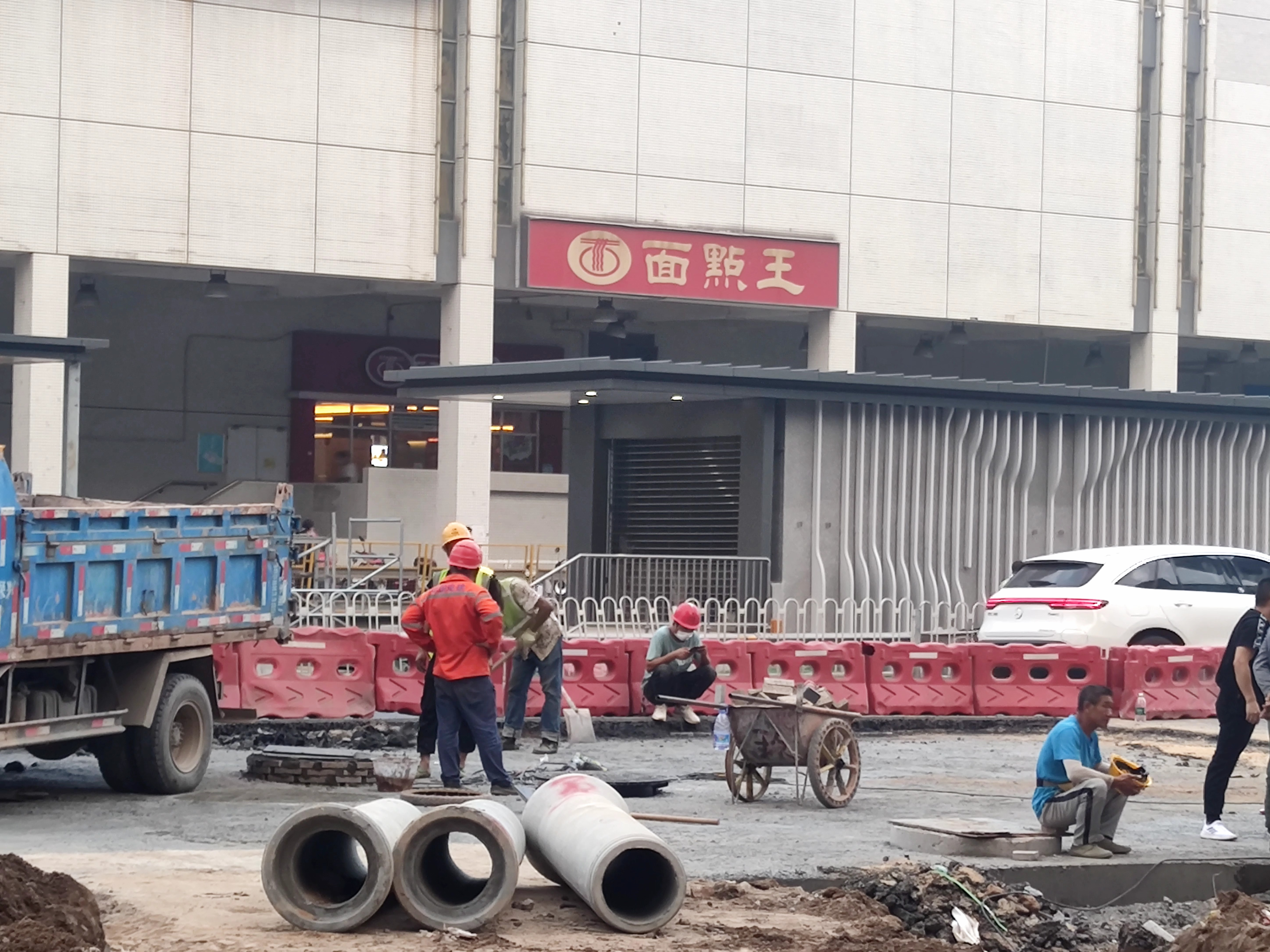
Entrance D (not open)

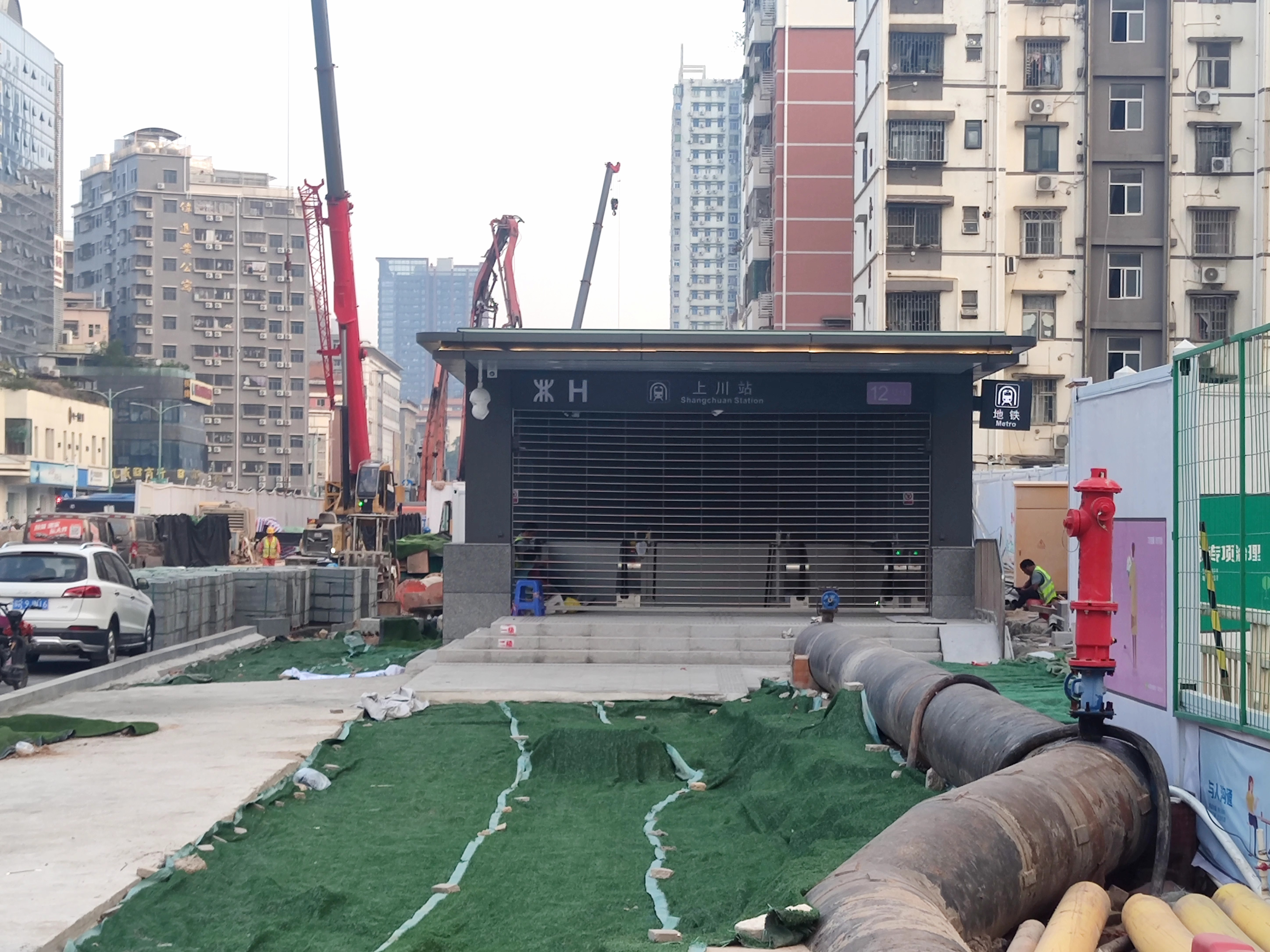
Entrance H

== Services ==
This is the service pattern of Shangchuan station.

Direction	First train	Last train	Service interval
Zuopaotai East	06:18	23:42	4–8 minutes
Waterlands Resort East	06:33	23:29	4–8 minutes
Waterlands Resort East (weekends)	06:30	23:30	8 minutes
