= Lingzhi station =

Shenzhen Metro Line 5 and Line 12 station

Lingzhi 灵芝
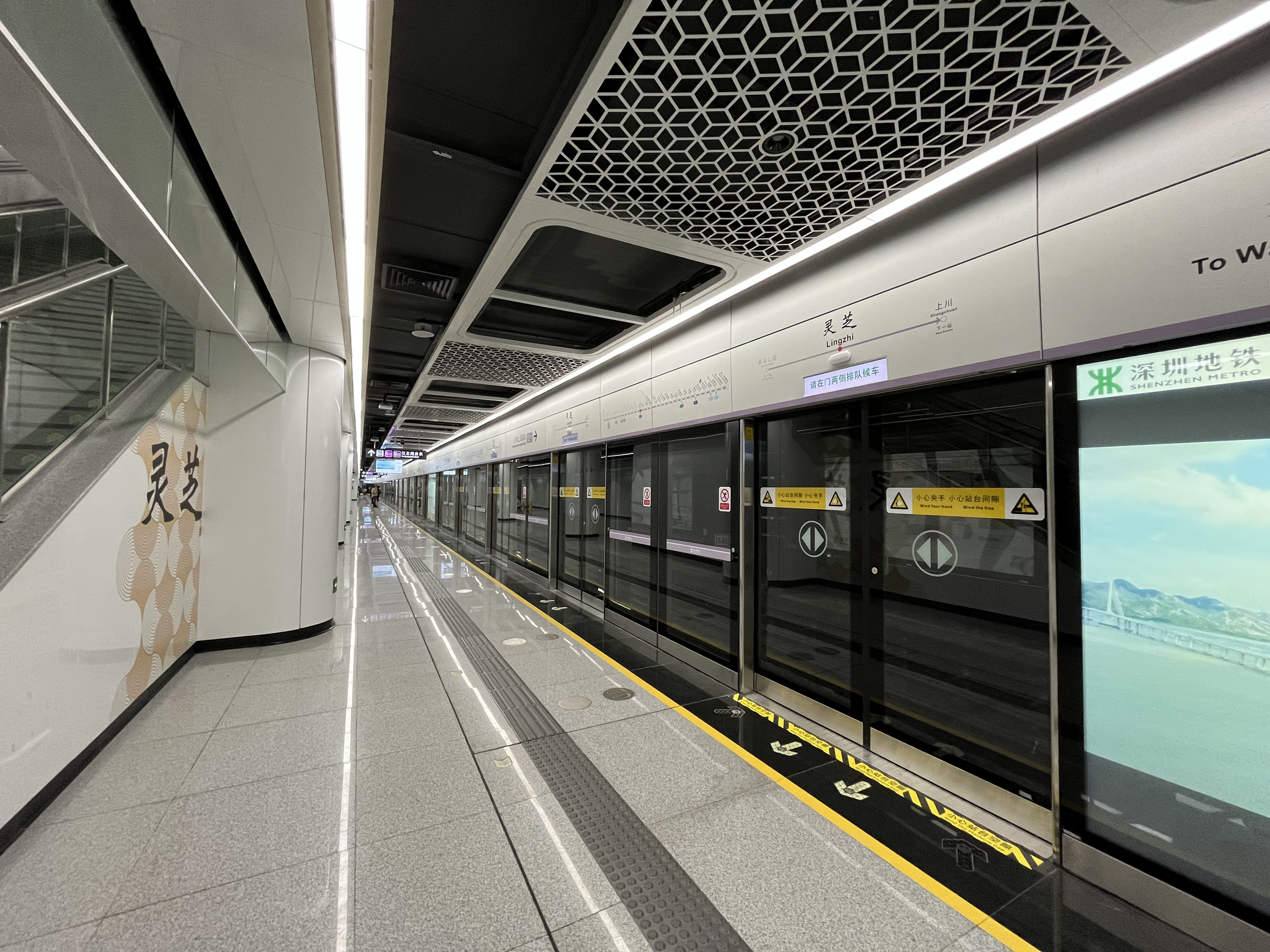
- Line 12 platform

Chinese name
- Traditional Chinese: 靈芝
- Simplified Chinese: 灵芝
Transcriptions
Standard Mandarin
- Hanyu Pinyin: Língzhī
Yue: Cantonese
- Yale Romanization: Líhngjī
- Jyutping: Ling4 Zi1

General information
- Location: Intersection of Qianjin 1st Road and Chuangye 2nd Road; Xin'an Subdistrict, Bao'an District, Shenzhen, Guangdong; China
- Coordinates: 22°34′19.16″N 113°53′57.23″E
- Operated by: SZMC (Shenzhen Metro Group); Shenzhen Line 12 Rail Transit Co., Ltd (Shenzhen Metro Group and PowerChina PPP)
- Lines: Line 5 Line 12
- Platforms: 4 (1 island platform and 2 side platforms)
- Tracks: 4

Construction
- Structure type: Underground
- Accessible: Yes

History
- Opened: Line 5: 22 June 2011 (15 years ago); Line 12: 28 November 2022 (3 years ago)

Services
Preceding station	Shenzhen Metro	Following station
Honglang North towards Grand Theater	Line 5	Fanshen towards Chiwan
Shangchuan towards Songgang	Line 12	Xin'an Park towards Zuopaotai East
Location

Lingzhi station (simplified Chinese: 灵芝站; traditional Chinese: 靈芝站; pinyin: Língzhī Zhàn; Jyutping: ling^{4} zi^{1} zaam^{6}; Cantonese Yale: Líhngjī Jaahm) is an interchange station for Line 5 and Line 12 of the Shenzhen Metro. Line 5 platforms opened on 22 June 2011 and Line 12 platforms opened on 28 November 2022. This station is an underground station. Its Chinese name may have come from 灵芝 (Ganoderma lucidum).

== Station layout ==
G	-	Exit
B1F; Concourse	Lobby	Ticket Machines, Customer Service, Station Control Room
B2F; 5 Platforms	Platform	5 towards Chiwan (Fanshen)
B2F; 5 Platforms	Island platform, doors will open on the left
B2F; 5 Platforms	Platform	5 towards Grand Theater (Honglang North)
B3F; 12 Platforms	Side platform, doors will open on the right
B3F; 12 Platforms	Platform	12 towards Songgang (Shangchuan)
B3F; 12 Platforms	Platform	12 towards Zuopaotai East (Xin'an Park)
B3F; 12 Platforms	Side platform, doors will open on the right

=== Entrances/exits ===
The station has 7 points of entry/exit. Exits A1, C1 and F are accessible via elevators, and Exit B has toilets.

Exit	Pictures	Destination
Exit A1		Chuangye 2nd Road (S), Qianjin 1st Road, Guancheng Shijia, Xin'an Middle School, Xin'anhu Primary School, Huafeng Plaza, Saibo Digital Plaza, Bao'an Inter-city Bus Station, Bao'an Art City, Bao'an Tax Bureau
Exit A2		Chuangye 2nd Road (S), Qianjin 1st Road, Guancheng Shijia, Xin'an Middle School, Xin'anhu Primary School, Huafeng Plaza, Saibo Digital Plaza, Bao'an Inter-city Bus Station, Bao'an Art City, Bao'an Tax Bureau
Exit B		Chuangye 2nd Road (S), Qianjin 1st Road, Shenzhen Bao'an Notary Public Office, Shenzhen Bao'an District Bureau of Local Taxation, Shenzhen Bao’an District Justice Bureau, Lingzhi Park, Shenxin Taifeng Building, Feicui Huating, Guanlida Building, Lingzhi Park North
Exit C1		Chuangye 2nd Road (N), Jinfeng Haoting Chuangye Center, Centralcon Central Park, Bao'an Chinese Medicine Hospital
Exit C2		Chuangye 2nd Road (N), Jinfeng Haoting Chuangye Center, Centralcon Central Park, Bao'an Chinese Medicine Hospital
Exit D		Chuangye 2nd Road (N), Gome, Ren Ren Le, China Everbright Bank, Haiya Department Store, Sundan
Exit E		Qianjin 1st Road, Bao'an District 25, Shenzhen Bao'an Traditional Chinese Medicine Hospital (Group) East Branch
Exit F		Qianjin 1st Road, Chuangye 2nd Road, Baomin Garden, Bitao Orchard

== Gallery ==
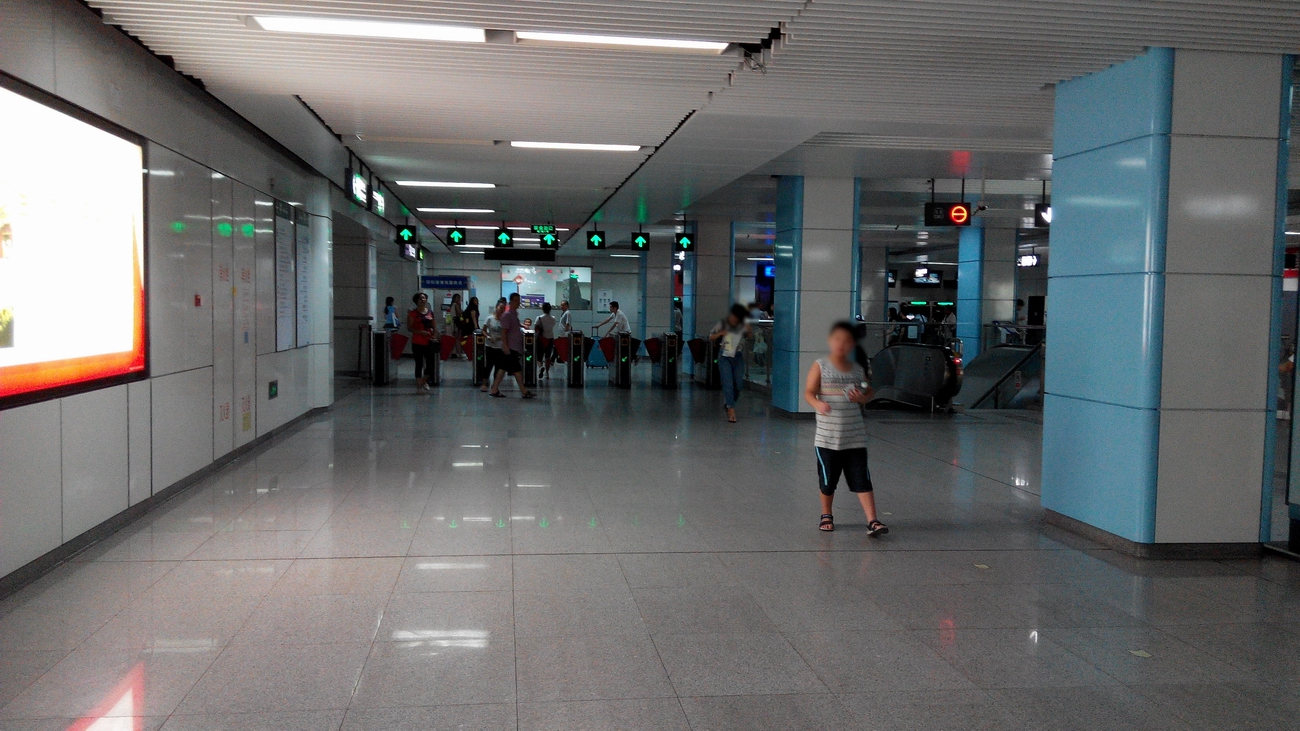
Line 5 concourse

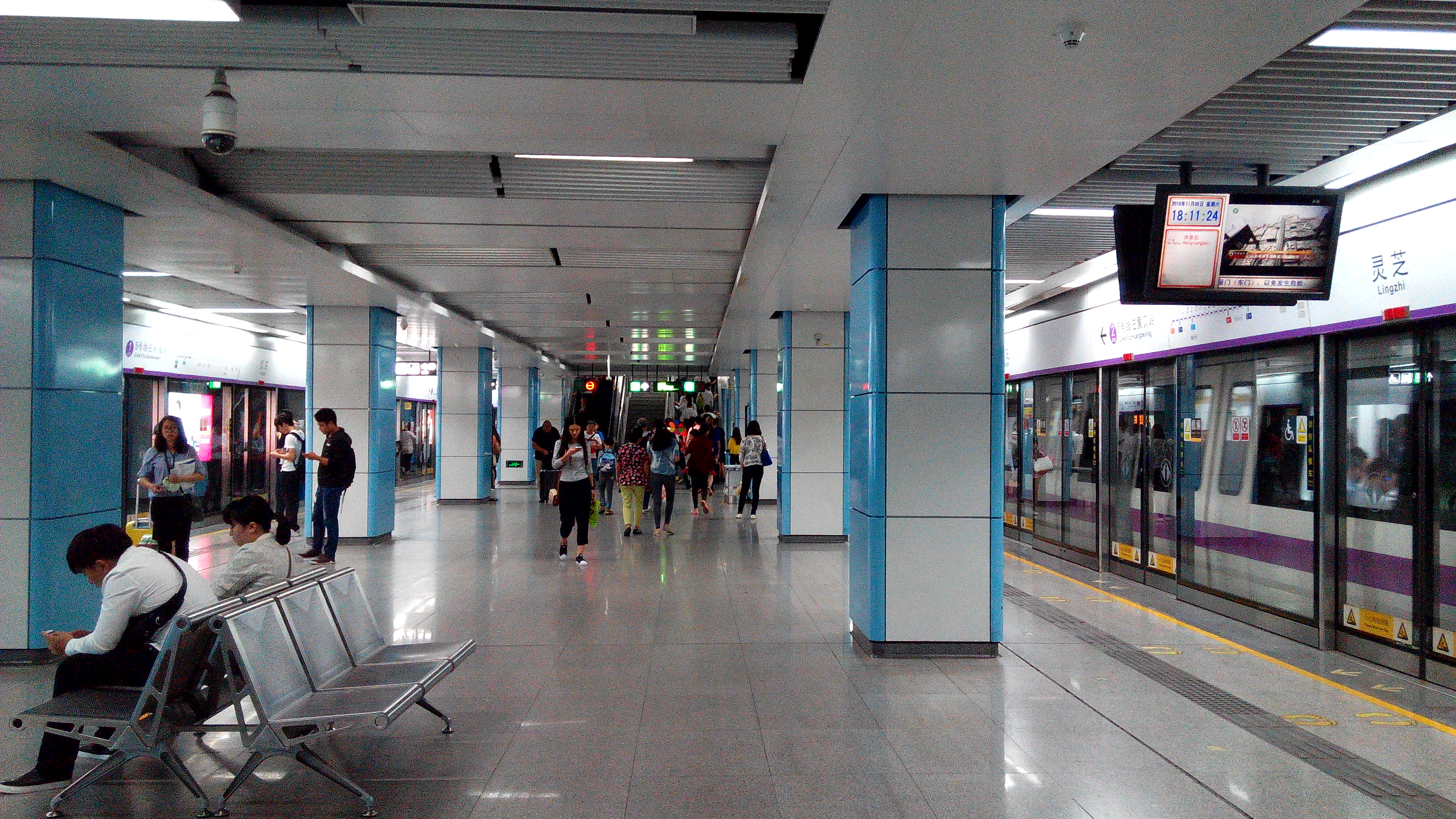
Line 5 platform

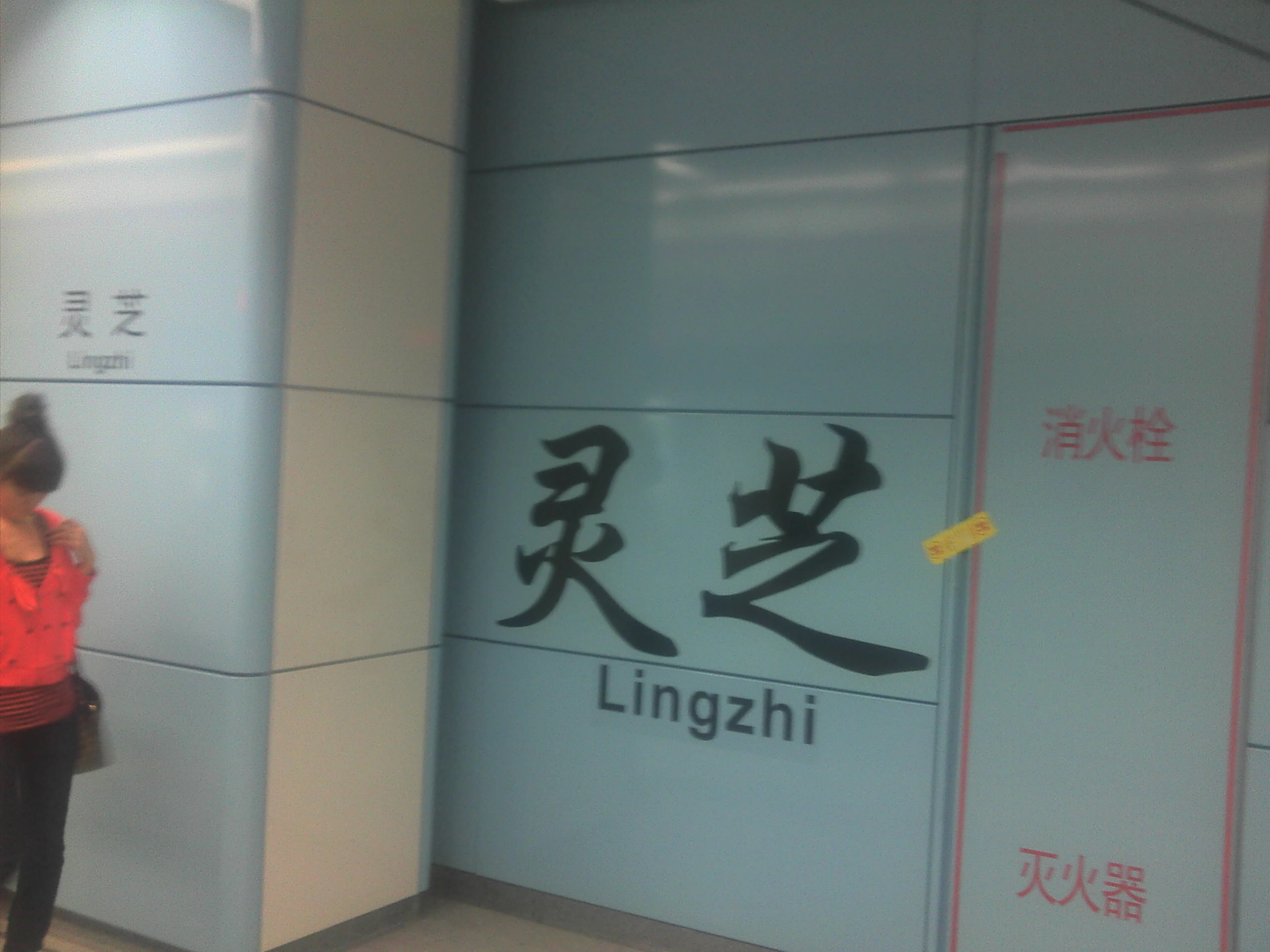
Line 5 platform calligraphy

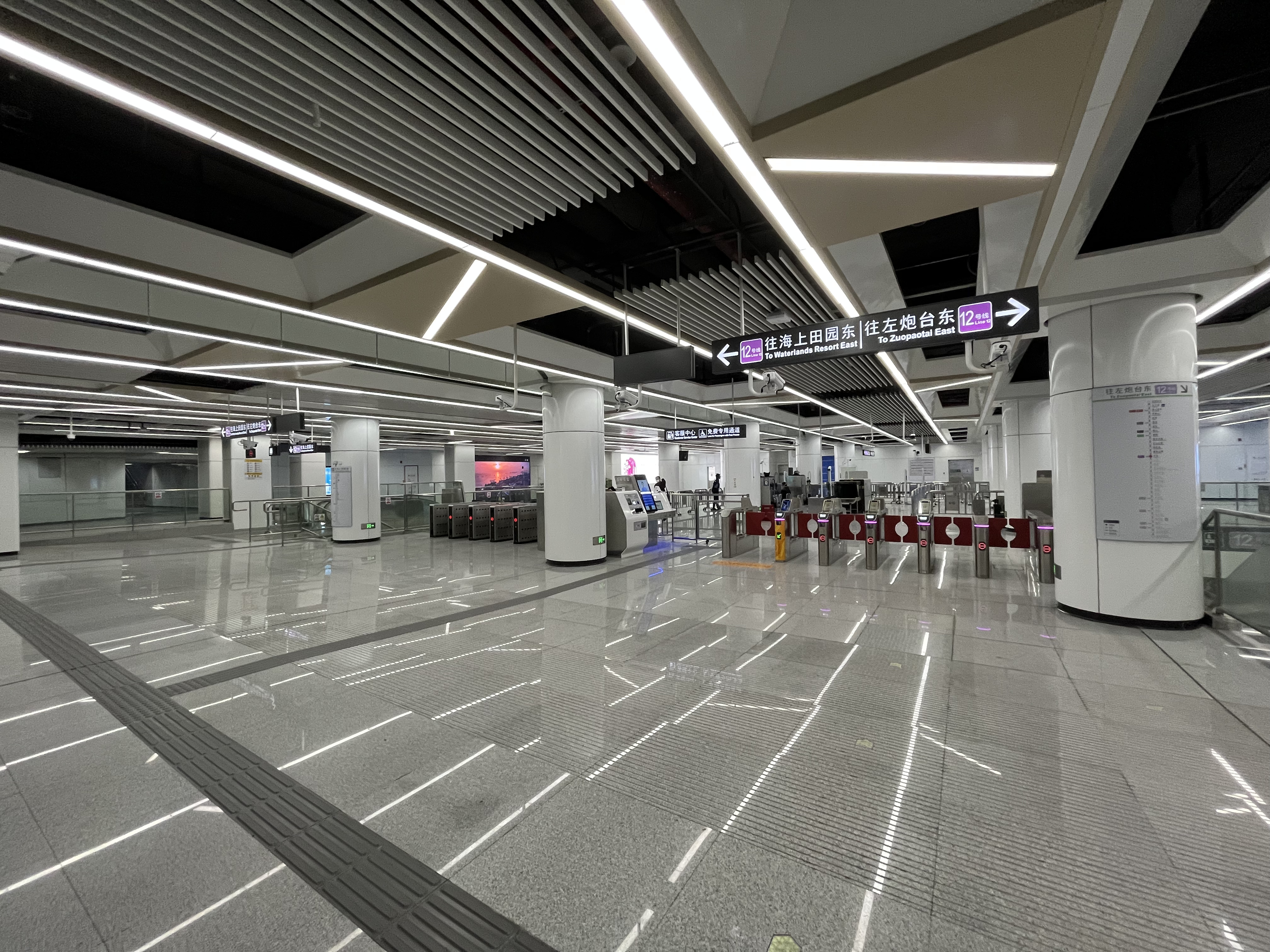
Line 12 concourse

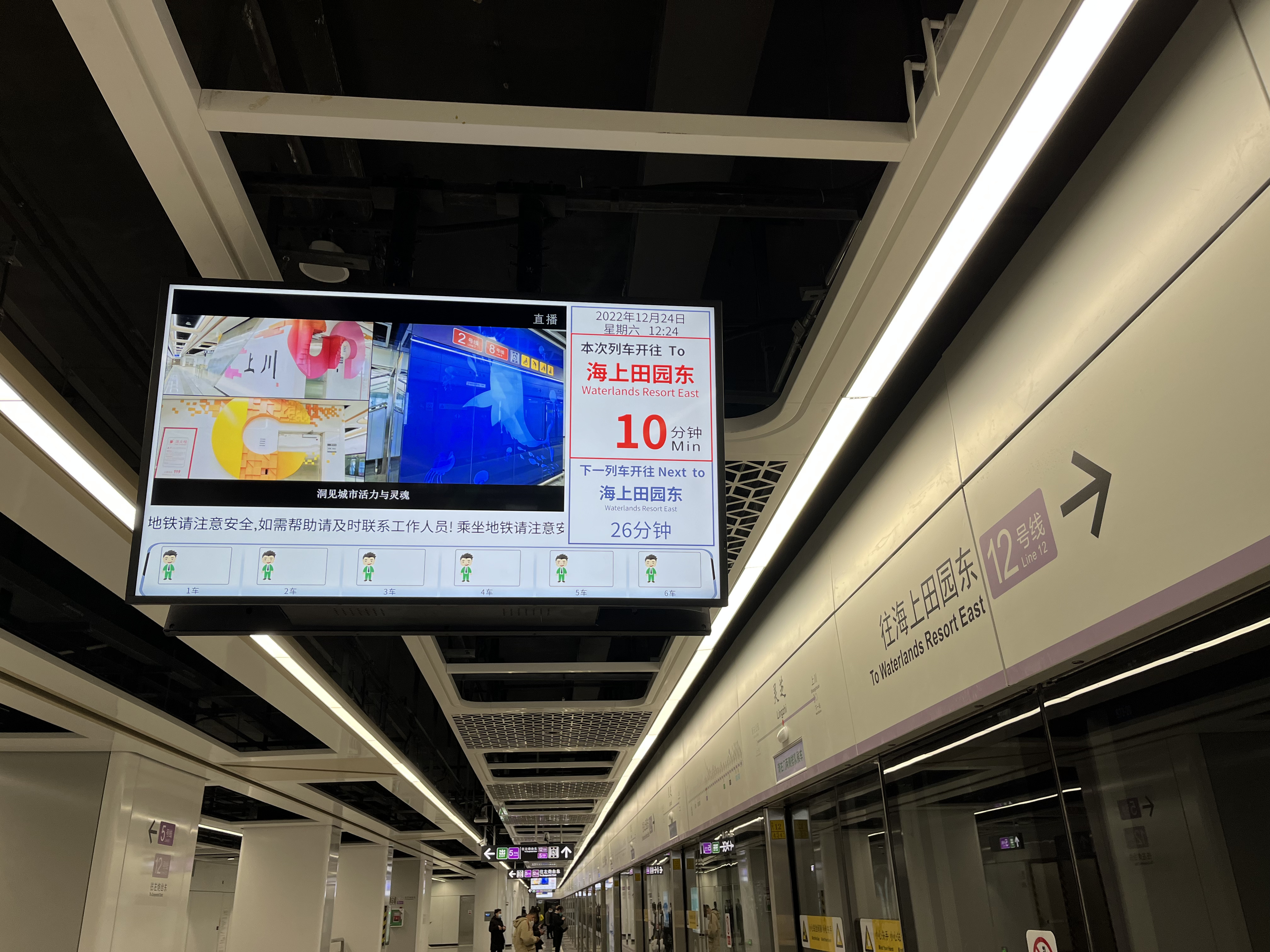
Line 12 passenger information display screen
