= 1995 Shenzhen murders =

Series of murder cases

- Native name: "95" 特大抢劫杀人案 ("95" mega robbery-murder case)
- Date: 1993 to 1994
- Location: Baoan District, Shenzhen
- Type: Murder, Robbery
- Perpetrators: 10 men, 6 women
- Deaths: 17
- Injuries: 1
- Property damage: Up to 3 million RMB
- Convicted: 14 executed, 2 imprisoned

The 1995 Shenzhen murders (Chinese: “95” 特大抢劫杀人案) were a series of murders that took place from 1993 to 1994 in Shenzhen's Bao'an District by a group led by Zhang Xiaojian and Chen Weixiang, consisting of 16 members. The gang targeted drivers on the roads from Bao'an District to Shenzhen Airport. They resulted in the deaths of 17 people and approximately 3 million RMB worth of goods and money stolen over the course of 2 years.

The group would lure taxi drivers to isolated areas, kill them, and take their vehicles and valuables before disposing of their bodies. They also employed women, including Zhang's girlfriend, to board drivers' vehicles under the guise of directing them to parlors.

In the following year in 1994, they expanded their tactics, with members dressing in police uniforms and flagging down luxury vehicles to strangle them using nylons or wires.

The murders culminated in June 1994, when a new member, Liu Yuxiang, attempted to intercept a vehicle near Shenzhen Airport. She caught the attention of police investigating the incidents and was apprehended after a chase. Over the next few months, the Shenzhen police led coordinated efforts to capture most of the perpetrators.

== Aftermath ==
The 1995 Shenzhen murders gained nationwide attention, with up to 20,000 people showing up on the day of the court hearing in Shenzhen to witness their trial. In 1995, 14 of the group's 16 members were sentenced to death.

== In the media ==
The Six Devil Women is a movie released in Hong Kong in 1996 inspired by events of the case.
