= Liutang station =

Shenzhen Metro Line 12 station

Liutang 流塘
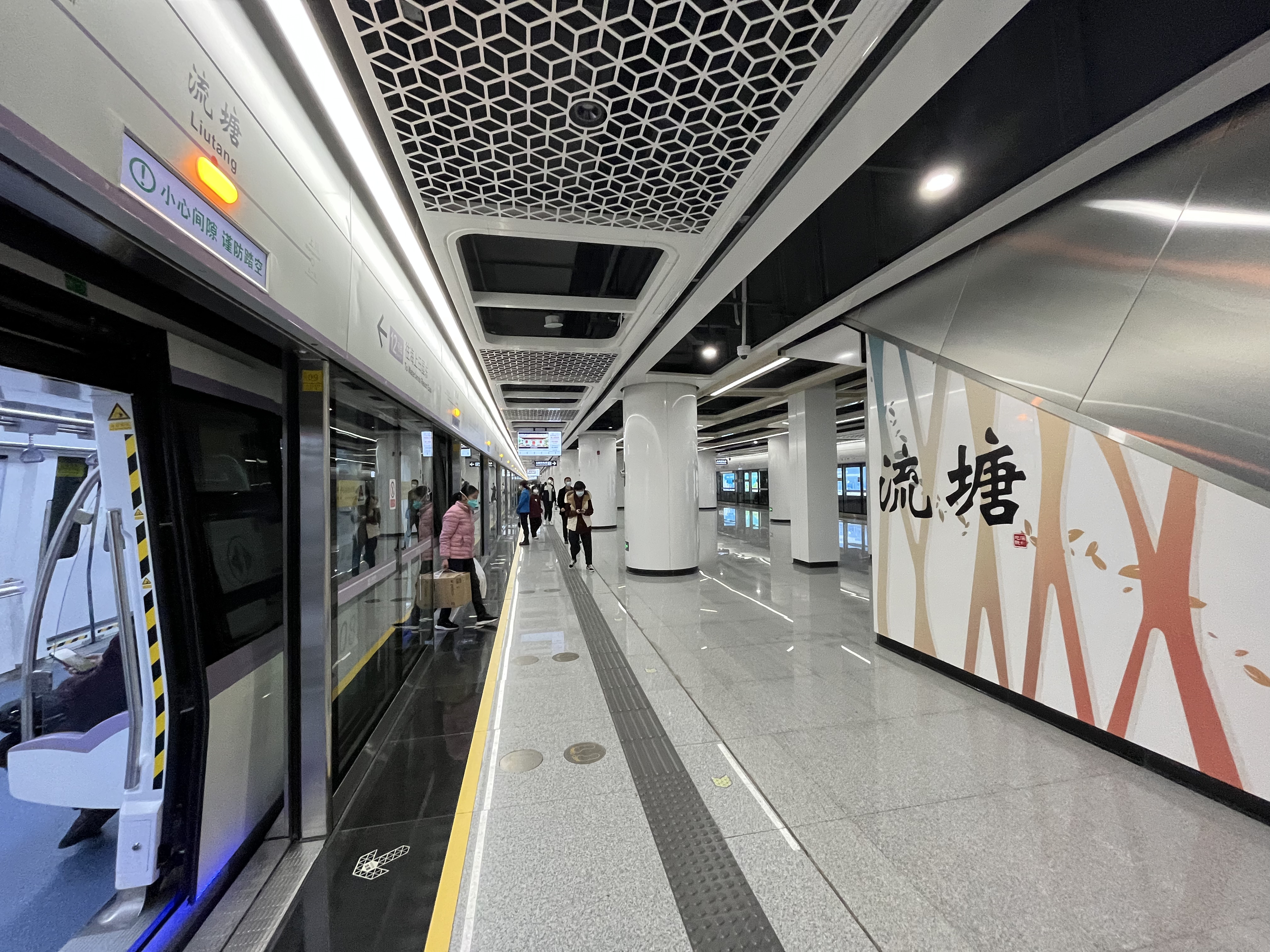
- Platform

Chinese name
- Chinese: 流塘
Transcriptions
Standard Mandarin
- Hanyu Pinyin: Liútáng
Yue: Cantonese
- Yale Romanization: Làutòng
- Jyutping: Lau4 Tong4

General information
- Location: Intersection of Qianjin 2nd Road and Liutang Road; Bao'an District, Shenzhen, Guangdong; China
- Coordinates: 22°35′13″N 113°53′3.44″E
- Operator: Shenzhen Line 12 Rail Transit Co., Ltd (Shenzhen Metro Group and PowerChina PPP)
- Line: Line 12
- Platforms: 2 (1 island platform)
- Tracks: 2

Construction
- Structure type: Underground
- Accessible: Yes

History
- Opened: 28 November 2022 (3 years ago)

Services
Preceding station	Shenzhen Metro	Following station
Bao'an Passenger Transport Terminal towards Songgang	Line 12	Shangchuan towards Zuopaotai East
Location

Liutang station (Chinese: 流塘站; pinyin: Liútáng Zhàn; Cantonese Yale: Làutòng Jaahm) is a metro station on Line 12 of Shenzhen Metro. It opened on 28 November 2022.

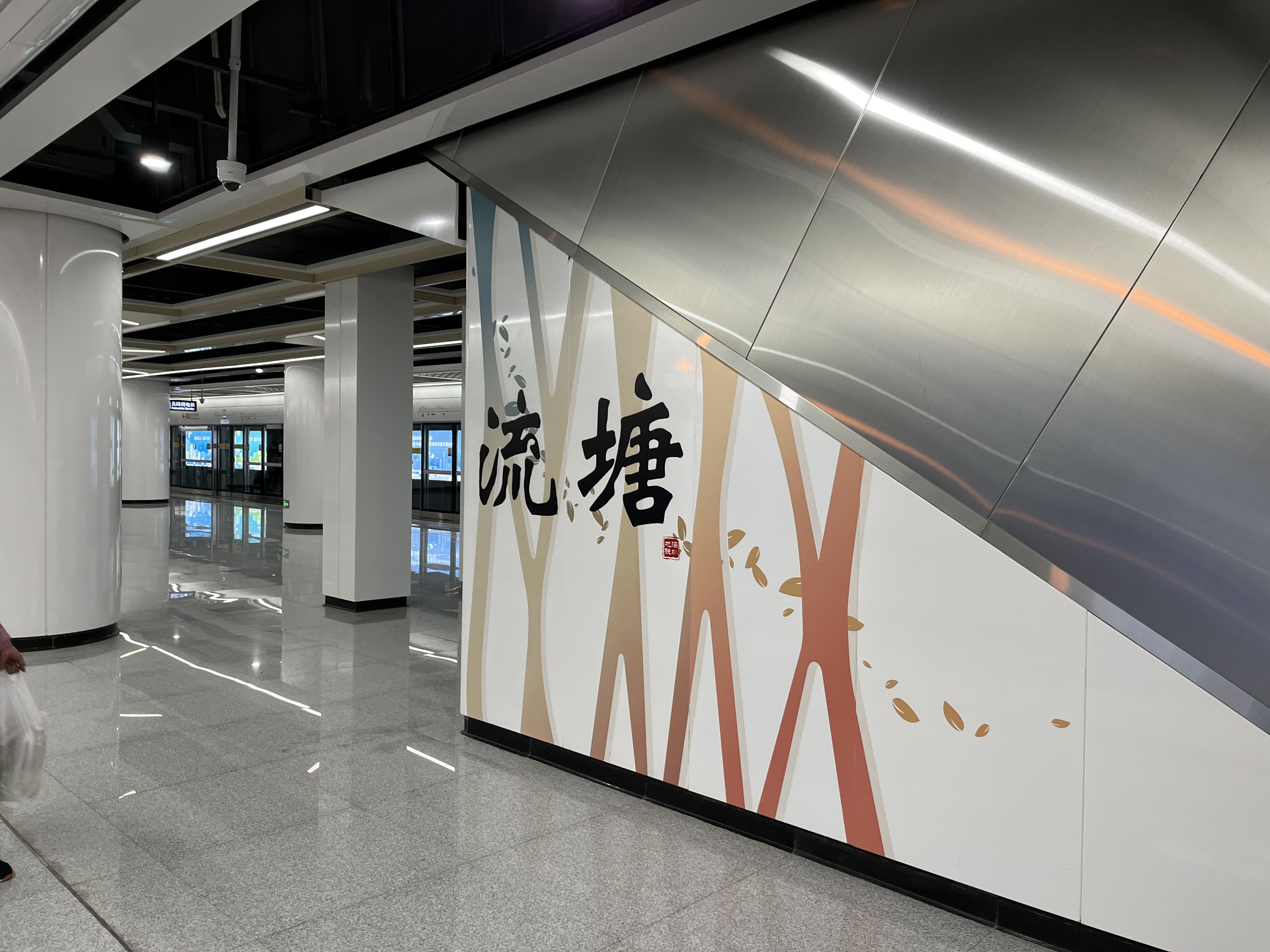
Calligraphy

== Station layout ==
The station has an island platform under Qianjin 2nd Road.

G	–	Exits A-D, G
B1F; Concourse	Lobby	Ticket Machines, Customer Service, Shops, Vending Machines
B2F; Platforms	Platform	12 towards Songgang (Bao'an Passenger Transport Terminal)
B2F; Platforms	Island platform, doors will open on the left
B2F; Platforms	Platform	12 towards Zuopaotai East (Shangchuan)

=== Entrances/exits ===
The station has 8 points of entry/exit.

Exit		Destination
Exit A		Qianjin 2nd Road (S), Liutang Park
Exit B	B1	Unopened
Exit B	B2	Qianjin 2nd Road (N), Xingzhuang Park Community
Exit C		Qianjin 2nd Road (N), COFCO Jinyun, Xixiang Hall
Exit D		Under construction
Exit G		Qianjin 2nd Road (S), Liutang Village, Jiahua Garden

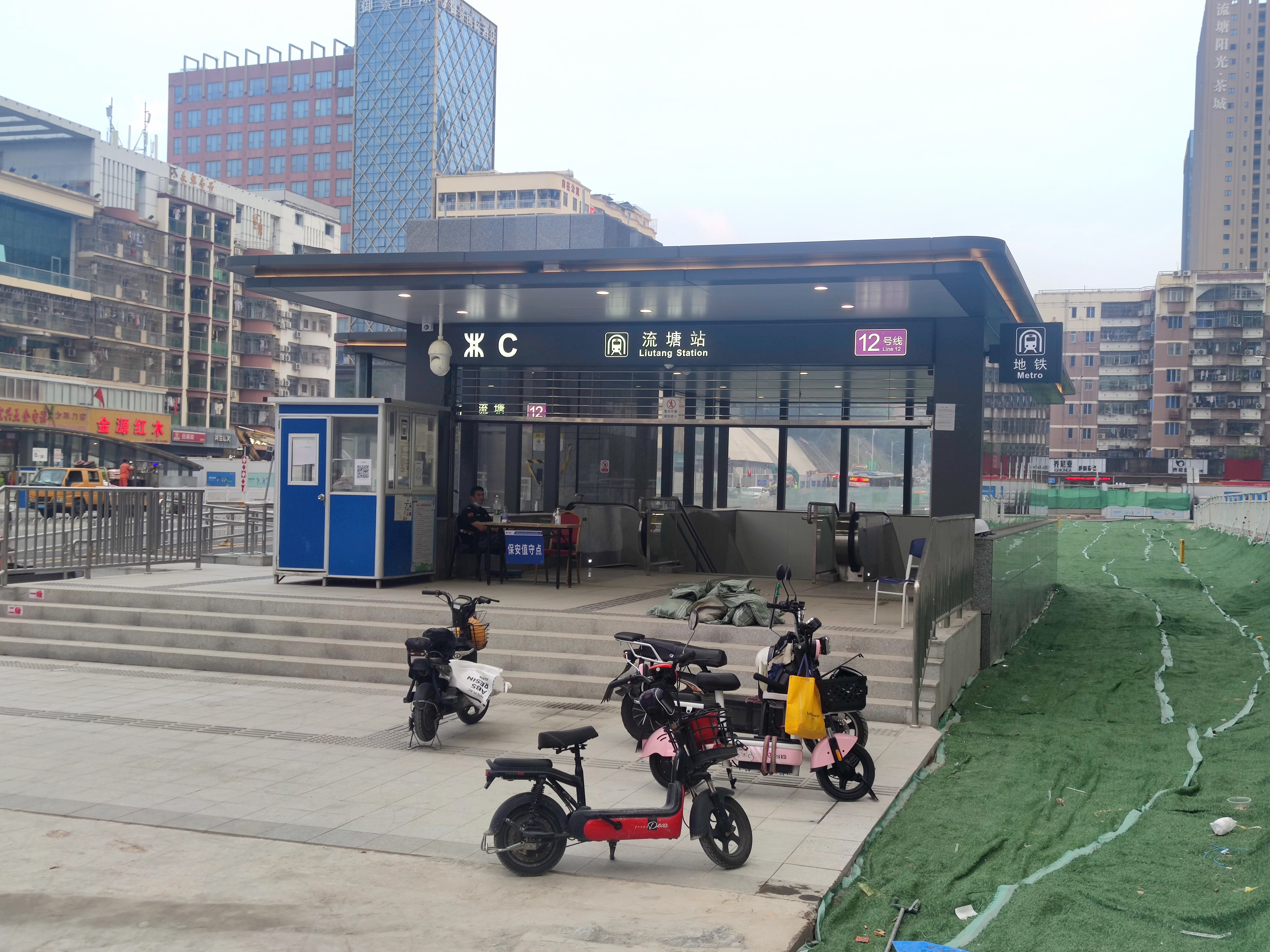
Entrance C

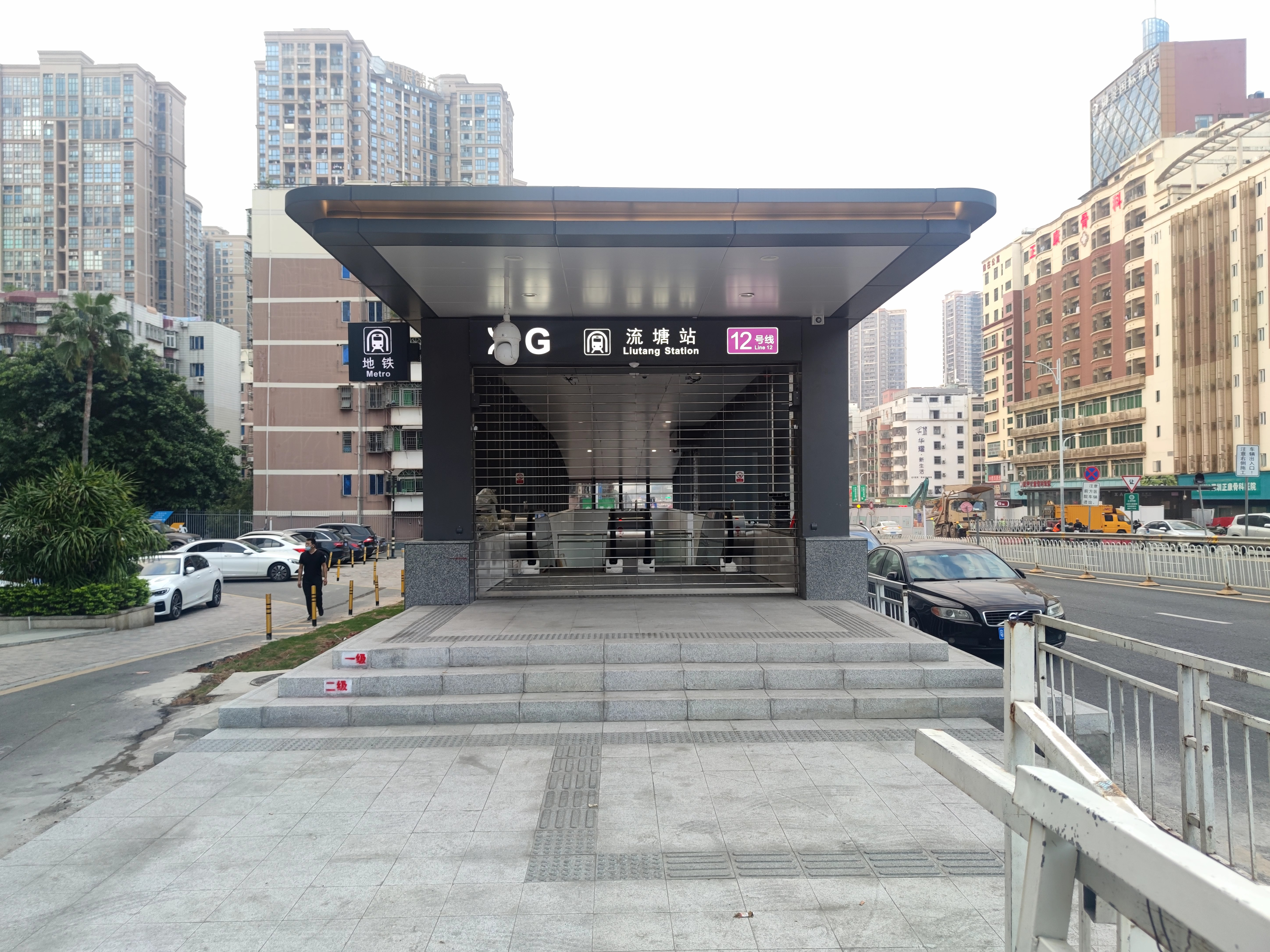
Entrance G

== Future development ==
In 2027, this station will feature an interchange with Line 15.
