= Shenzhen World South station =

Metro station in Shenzhen, China

Coordinates: 22.6867°N 113.7739°E

Shenzhen World South 国展南
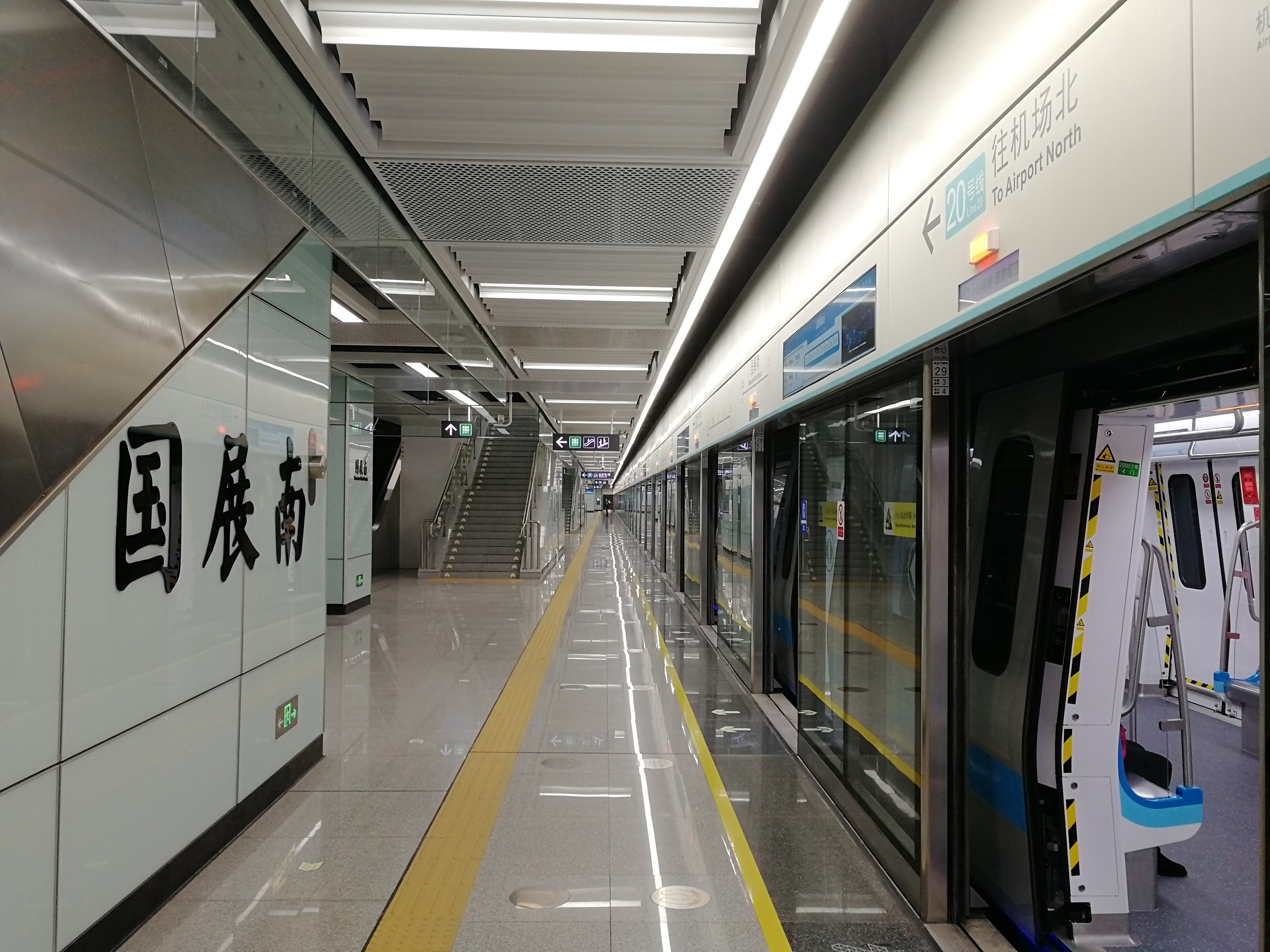
- Platform of Line 20

General information
- Location: Shenzhen, Guangdong; China
- Operated by: SZMC (Shenzhen Metro Group)
- Line: Line 20
- Platforms: 2 (1 island platform)
- Tracks: 2

Construction
- Structure type: Underground
- Accessible: Yes

History
- Opened: 28 December 2021

Services
Preceding station	Shenzhen Metro	Following station
Shenzhen World towards Convention & Exhibition City	Line 20	Airport North Terminus
Location

Shenzhen World South station is a station on Line 20 of Shenzhen Metro in Shenzhen, Guangdong, China, which opened on 28 December 2021. It is located in Bao'an District.

== Station layout ==
G	-	Exit
B1F; Concourse	Lobby	Customer Service, Shops, Vending machines, ATMs
B2F; Platforms	Platform	20 towards Convention & Exhibition City (Shenzhen World)
B2F; Platforms	Island platform, doors will open on the left
B2F; Platforms	Platform	20 towards Airport North (Terminus)
