= Line 12 (Shenzhen Metro) =

Metro line in Shenzhen, China

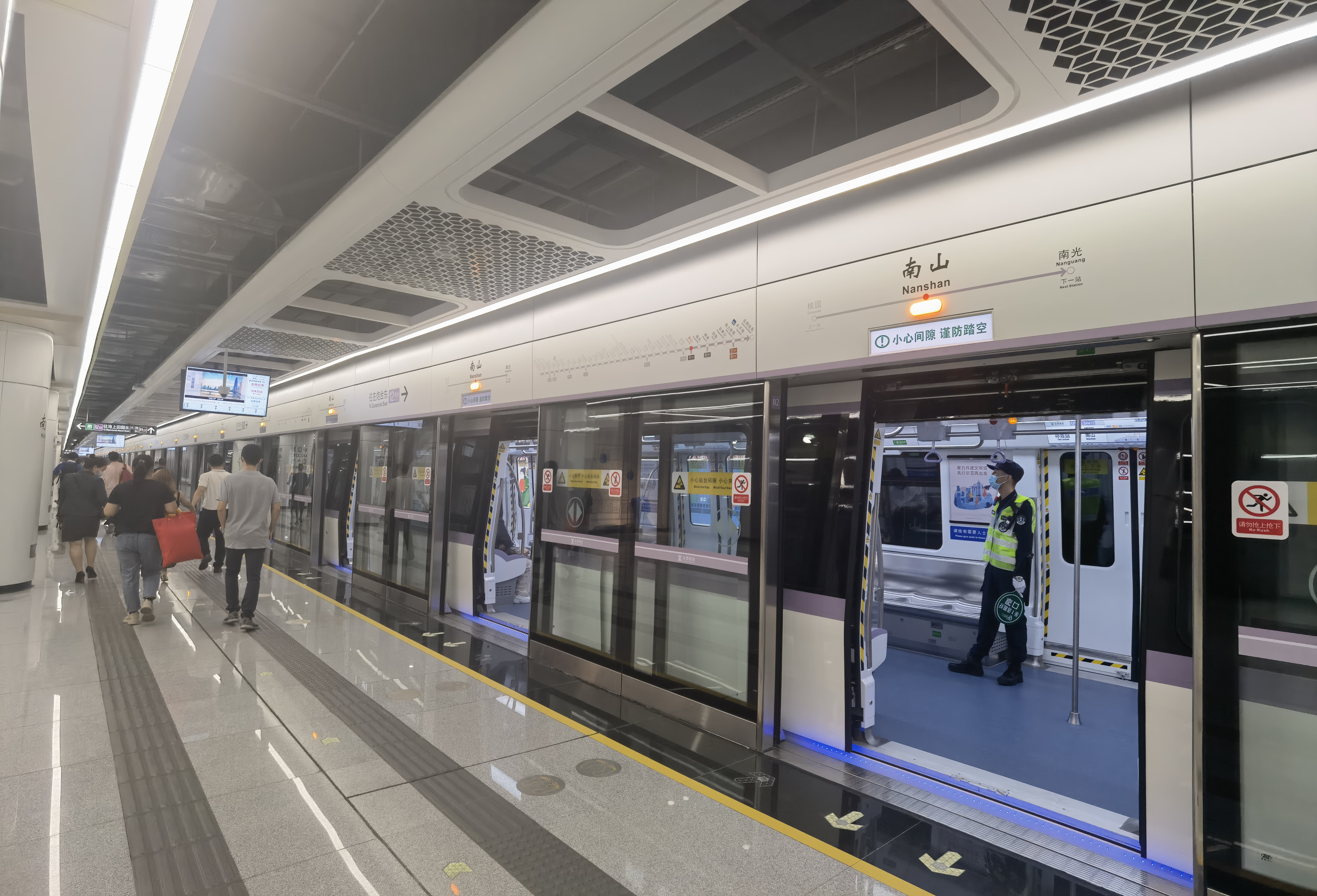
- Nanshan station

Overview
- Status: Operational
- Locale: Shenzhen, China
- Termini: Zuopaotai East; Songgang
- Stations: 39
- Color on map: Lavender (#a192b2)

Service
- Type: Rapid transit
- System: Shenzhen Metro
- Operator(s): SZMC (Shenzhen Metro Group)

History
- Opened: 28 November 2022; 3 years ago

Technical
- Line length: 48.59 km (30.2 mi)
- Number of tracks: 2
- Character: Underground
- Track gauge: 1,435 mm (4 ft 8 1/2 in) standard gauge
- Electrification: 1,500 V DC (Overhead lines)
- Operating speed: 80 km/h (50 mph)

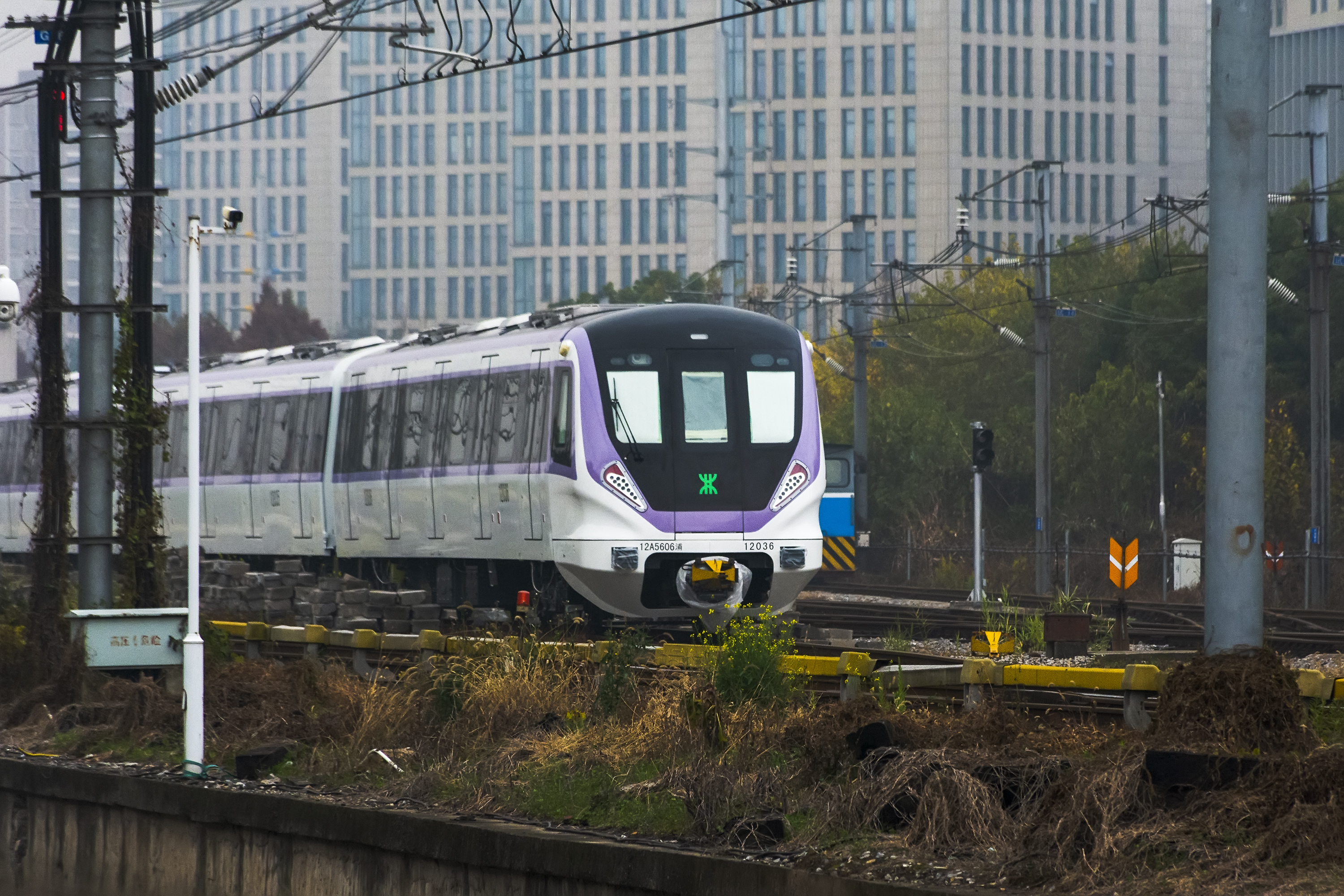
Line 12 train

Line 12 of the Shenzhen Metro is one of the four new metro lines of Phase IV expansion in the Chinese city of Shenzhen. Its construction began in 2017 and it opened on 28 November 2022. The line uses six car type A trains and runs north to south on the east banks of the Pearl River Delta.

== History ==
=== Timeline ===
| Segment | Commencement | Length | Station(s) | Name |
|---|---|---|---|---|
| Zuopaotai East — Waterlands Resort East | 28 November 2022 | 40.56 km (25.20 mi) | 33 | Phase 1 |
| Waterlands Resort East — Songgang | 28 December 2024 | 8.16 km (5.07 mi) | 6 | Phase 2 (north extension) |

== Stations ==
Phase 1 of Line 12 starts at Zuopaotai East in Shekou, Nanshan District at the South west end of Shenzhen and ends at Waterlands Resort East in Shajing, Bao'an District in the northwest end of Shenzhen. Phase 1 of the line is 40.56 km in length with 33 stations. Phase 2 to Songgang adds 6 stations north of Waterlands Resort East and extends the line to Line 6 and Line 11. The extension is 8.16 km in length and opened on 28 December 2024.

| Station name | | Connections | Nearby bus stops | Location |
| English | Chinese | Connections | Nearby bus stops | Location |
|---|---|---|---|---|
| Zuopaotai East | 左炮台东 | | 70 M400 | Nanshan |
| Taiziwan | 太子湾 | | M105 M448 | Nanshan |
| Sea World | 海上世界 | 2 8 | 37 113 122 204 226 B607 M105 M106 M133 M400 M409 M430 M448 M493 M519 M527 | Nanshan |
| Huaguoshan | 花果山 | | 113 M133 M241 M409 M448 M493 M527 | Nanshan |
| Sihai | 四海 | 15 | 113 122 204 B605 B817 M106 M133 M241 M400 M409 M448 M484 M527 | Nanshan |
| Nanyou | 南油 | 9 | 113 122 226 328 M106 M133 M242 M398 M448 M467 M506 M527 | Nanshan |
| Nanguang | 南光 | | 74 204 369 B615 E3 M105 M241 M372 M483 M506 N4 | Nanshan |
| Nanshan | 南山 | 11 | 58 74 204 369 377 E3 M105 M182 M222 M241 M347 M372 M463 M483 M506 M562 N4 | Nanshan |
| Taoyuan | 桃园 | 1 | 58 74 204 223 226 234 337 369 E3 M176 M182 M222 M241 M242 M349 M372 M463 M479 M492 M562 N4 NM242 | Nanshan |
| Nantou Ancient City | 南头古城 | 20 | 21 22 42 122 201 204 320 323 324 328 337 338 395 M176 M191 M194 M200 M241 M349 M358 M364 M413 M435 M463 M492 M506 M527 M530 N4 Peak-express 32（高快32）Peak-time 62（高峰62）Charming-Bay-Area Line（魅力湾区线） | Nanshan |
| Zhongshan Park | 中山公园 | | 21 22 37 122 201 206 324 B627 M176 M241 M298 M349 M475 M492 M506 Peak-time 62（高峰62） | Nanshan |
| Tongle South | 同乐南 | | M245 M249 M349 | Nanshan |
| Xin'an Park | 新安公园 | | 605 606 615 718 B832 B904 M206 M245 M246 M349 M377 M469 M550 Peak-time 172（高峰172） | Bao'an |
| Lingzhi | 灵芝 | 5 | 395 606 610 615 629 B831 B832 E23 M182 M197 M245 M249 M250 M313 M378 M393 M395 M518 Peak-express 33（高快33）Peak-time 121（高峰121） | Bao'an |
| Shangchuan | 上川 | | 395 603 615 629 704 718 B831 M182 M197 M245 M246 M250 M259 M313 M379 M382 M393 M469 M518 M560 | Bao'an |
| Liutang | 流塘 | 15 | 606 718 B864 M131 M250 M259 M313 M376 M393 | Bao'an |
| Bao'an Passenger Transport Terminal | 宝安客运站 | | 395 603 605 606 718 B834 B864 M131 M191 M209 M235 M241 M242 M250 M313 M375 M393 M528 Peak-express 29（高快29）Peak-express 47（高快47）Peak-time 179（高峰179） | Bao'an |
| Baotian 1st Road | 宝田一路 | | 395 603 606 704 707 E36 M210 M250 M350 M355 Peak-express 32（高快32）Peak-express 47（高快47） | Bao'an |
| Pingluan Hill | 平峦山 | | 395 603 707 E36 M210 M246 M250 M350 M355 | Bao'an |
| Xixiang Taoyuan | 西乡桃源 | | 395 603 707 E23 E36 M210 M250 M350 M355 M358 M470 Peak-express 32（高快32）Peak-express 47（高快47） | Bao'an |
| Zhongwu South | 钟屋南 | | B965 M179 M246 M350 M511 M558 | Bao'an |
| Huangtian | 黄田 | | 337 362 629 B836 E16 E40 M246 M335 M350 M395 M413 M435 M511 M522 M531 Peak-express 29（高快29）Peak-time 121（高峰121） | Bao'an |
| Xingwei | 兴围 | | 337 362 629 B827 B875 B929 E16 E40 M335 M350 M395 M413 M435 M531 Peak-express 29（高快29）Peak-time 121（高峰121） | Bao'an |
| Airport East | 机场东 | 1 20 | 338 615 B875 B929 M237 M291 M331 M332 M334 M351 M370 M387 M395 M419 M472 M530 M531 | Bao'an |
| Fuwei | 福围 | | 338 615 B875 B929 M237 M291 M331 M334 M351 M371 M387 M419 M472 M530 | Bao'an |
| Huaide | 怀德 | | 615 B635 B875 M159 M251 M310 M514 M530 M531 | Bao'an |
| Fuyong | 福永 | 11 | 338 B635 B929 M159 M236 M237 M251 M252 M291 M310 M331 M351 M387 M395 M472 M514 | Bao'an |
| Qiaotou West | 桥头西 | | M251 | Bao'an |
| Fuhai West | 福海西 | FHA | 615 B892 B893 M159 M236 M237 M252 M310 M331 M515 M536 | Bao'an |
| Shenzhen World | 国展 | 20 | 615 B892 M515 | Bao'an |
| Shenzhen World North | 国展北 | 20 | B892 M515 Peak-time 81（高峰81） | Bao'an |
| Waterlands Resort South | 海上田园南 | | | Bao'an |
| Waterlands Resort East | 海上田园东 | | 337 652 779 M331 M351 | Bao'an |
| Haoxiang | 蚝乡 | | 650 | Bao'an |
| Shahao | 沙蚝 | | 337 652 M179 | Bao'an |
| Shajing Ancient Market | 沙井古墟 | | M159 | Bao'an |
| Buchong | 步涌 | | 652 M184 | Bao'an |
| Langxia | 朗下 | | Dongguan 289（莞289） | Bao'an |
| Songgang | 松岗 | 6 11 | B900 B933 B941 B980 M178 M255 M291 M490 M494 M512 M513 | Bao'an |
