= Bao'an, Shenzhen =

Coordinates: 22.5534°N 113.884°E

Bao'an 宝安区 Paoan
- District
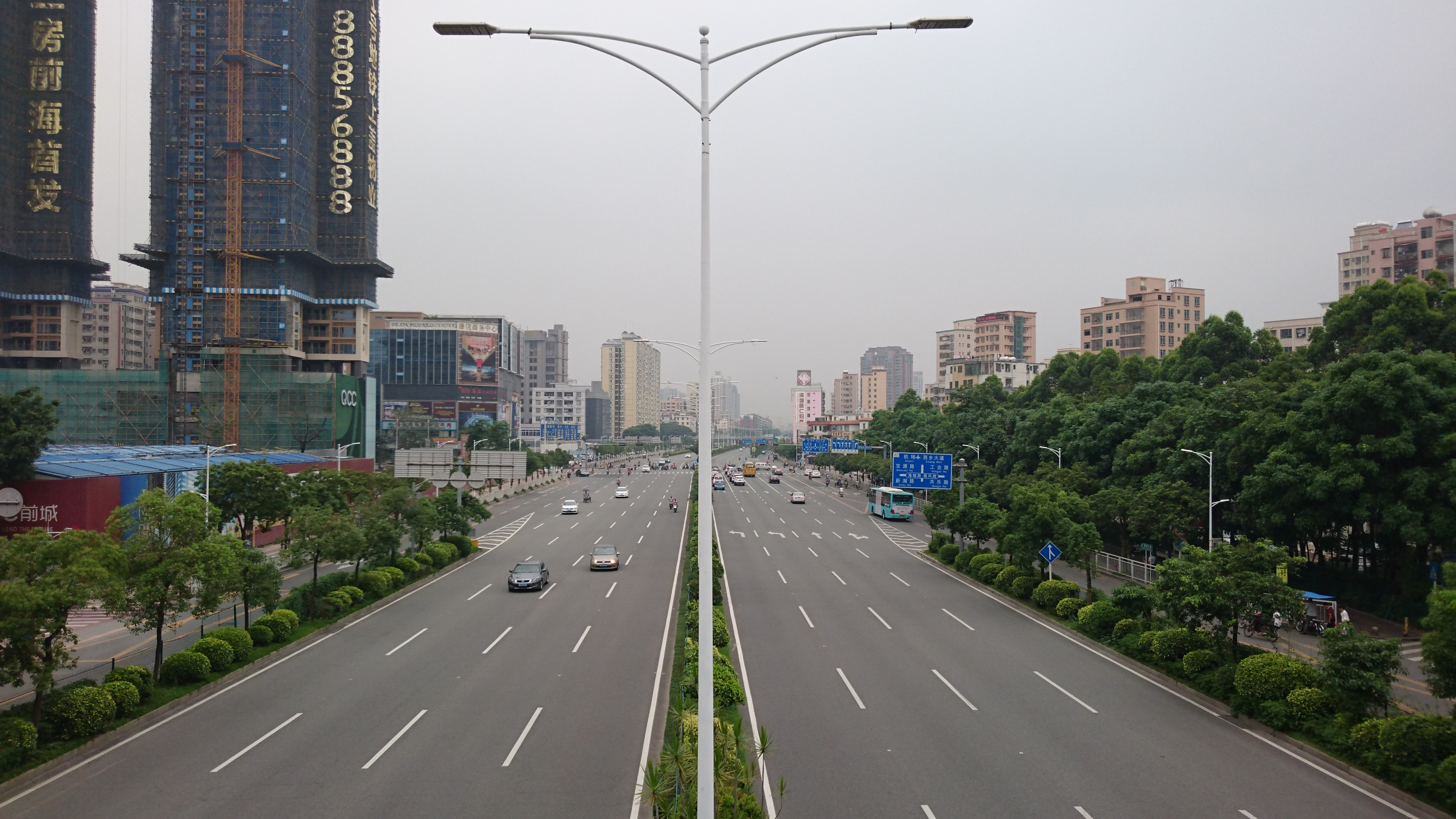
- Skyline of Xixang Subdistrict, Bao'an District
- Interactive map of Bao'an
- Country: People's Republic of China
- Province: Guangdong
- Sub-provincial city: Shenzhen

Area
  - Total: 398 km^{2} (154 sq mi)

Population (2020)
  - Total: 4,476,554
  - Density: 11,200/km^{2} (29,100/sq mi)
- Time zone: UTC+8 (China Standard)
- Website: www.baoan.gov.cn

Bao'an, Shenzhen
- Simplified Chinese: 宝安区
- Traditional Chinese: 寶安區
Transcriptions
Standard Mandarin
- Hanyu Pinyin: Bǎo'ān Qū
Yue: Cantonese
- Jyutping: bou^{2}on^{1} keoi^{1}

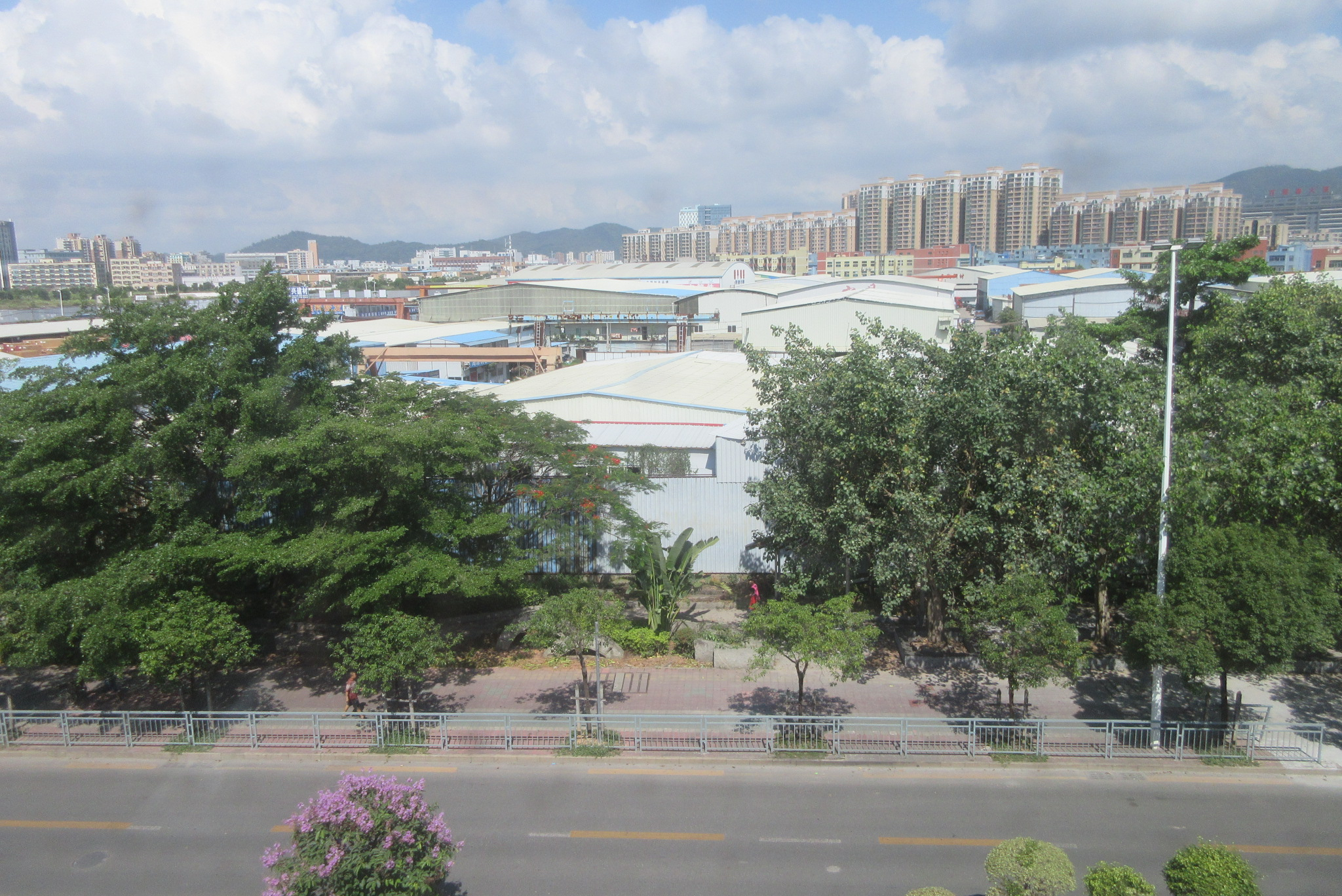
Bao'an District near Tangwei Station

Bao'an District (Chinese: 宝安区) is one of the nine districts comprising the city of Shenzhen, Guangdong province. It is one of the districts formerly lying outside the Shenzhen Special Economic Zone.

== History ==
Bao'an was the historical name of Bao'an County (also known as Xin'an County) of the Qing dynasty, which included area of modern-day Shenzhen and Hong Kong. The area of today Bao'an District, was integrated into Shenzhen in 1979, which the Bao'an County was promoted as a city.

Bao'an was reverted into county status in 1981, as the administrative unit of the area that belongs to Shenzhen, but now belongs to Shenzhen Special Economic Zone. Border patrols were also established in the border of the Economic Zone. In 1991, Shenzhen Bao'an International Airport, located in Bao'an County, was opened.

Finally Bao'an district was established on January 1, 1993. Two New Districts (Chinese: 新区) were created as sub-districts of Bao'an district, namely Guangming and Longhua new districts, in 2007 and 2011 respectively.

In 2010, Shenzhen Special Economic Zone was enlarged to cover the whole Shenzhen city.

Bao'an became the final filming spot in the experimental Swedish documentary Logistics.

Rapid development occurred in the Bao'an District. Longhua District was separated from Bao'an and became a district on 11 October 2016. In 2018, Guangming District was also separated from Bao'an District.

== Demographics ==
The district had a population of 4,476,554 by November 2020. About 85% of Bao'an's population are migrants from other parts of China, most speaking Standard Chinese (Standard Mandarin). Hence this made Standard Chinese the primary Chinese variety spoken in the district. Cantonese is also widely spoken, between locals and migrants from around Guangdong Province (Canton Province).

== Public Safety ==
Bao'an has, as of 2008, a notoriously bad safety record. Since the turn of the millennium, the district has seen a string of high-profile abductions, robberies, and other cases of violent crime. However, in the last four years, this has become less of an issue with an increased police presence and higher average income in the district.

== Subdistricts ==
Bao'an District comprises ten subdistricts:

Name	Chinese (S)	Hanyu Pinyin	Canton Romanization	Population (2010)	Area (km^{2})
Xin'an Subdistrict	新安街道	Xīn'ān Jiēdào	sen1 ngon1 gai1 dou6	410,056	30.90
Xixiang Subdistrict	西乡街道	Xīxiāng Jiēdào	sei1 hêng1 gai1 dou6	580,736	106.00
Songgang Subdistrict	松岗街道	Sōnggǎng Jiēdào	cung4 gong1 gai1 dou6	398,153	64.00
Shajing Subdistrict	沙井街道	Shājǐng Jiēdào	sa1 zéng2 gai1 dou6	529,041	60.00
Fuyong Subdistrict	福永街道	Fúyǒng Jiēdào	fug1 wing5 gai1 dou6	472,792	66.20
Shiyan Subdistrict	石岩街道	Shíyán Jiēdào	ség6 ngam4 gai1 dou6	248,139	64.60
Hangcheng Subdistrict	航城街道	Hángchēng Jiēdào			
Fuhai Subdistrict	福海街道	Fúhǎi Jiēdào			
Xinqiao Subdistrict	新桥街道	Xīnqiáo Jiēdào			
Yanluo Subdistrict	燕罗街道	Yànluō Jiēdào			

== Economy ==
Bao'an is predominantly a secondary sector economy as industrial center famous for having a concentration electronics factories, mostly in Xixiang and Guanlan sub-districts. There is also a sizable service industry. Agriculture, which used to dominate the economy, has diminished in recent years. Like many parts of Shenzhen, high-rises can be found all over Bao'an.

Four airlines are headquartered on the grounds of Shenzhen Bao'an International Airport: Shenzhen Airlines, Jade Cargo International, Shenzhen Donghai Airlines, and SF Airlines.

== Transportation ==
Shenzhen Bao'an International Airport is situated in this district. Guangzhou–Shenzhen intercity railway also travel through the district. Shenzhen metro lines 1, 5, 6, 11, 12 and 20 go through the district at some point.

=== Regional Railway ===
- Guangzhou–Shenzhen intercity Shenzhen Airport, Shenzhen Airport North, Fuhai West, Shajing West

=== Shenzhen Metro ===
Bao'an is currently served by six metro lines operated by Shenzhen Metro:

- Line 1 - Xin'an, Bao'an Center 5, Bao'an Stadium, Pingzhou, Xixiang, Gushu, Hourui, Airport East 12
- Line 5 - Baohua, Bao'an Center 1, Fanshen, Lingzhi 12, Honglang North, Xingdong
- Line 6 - Songgang 11, Xitou, Songgang Park, Shangwu, Guantian
- Line 11 - Bitou, Songgang 6, Houting, Shajing, Ma'an Hill, Tangwei, Qiaotou, Fuyong 12, Airport North 20, Airport, Bihaiwan, Bao'an
- Line 12 - Xin'an Park, Lingzhi 5, Shangchuan, Liutang, Bao'an Passenger Transport Terminal, Baotian 1st Road, Pingluan Hill, Xixiang Taoyuan, Zhongwu South, Huangtian, Xingwei, Airport East 1, Fuwei, Huaide, Fuyong 11, Qiaotou West, Fuhai West, Shenzhen World 20, Shenzhen World North 20, Waterlands Resort South, Waterlands Resort East
- Line 20 - Convention & Exhibition City, Shenzhen World North 12, Shenzhen World 12, Shenzhen World South, Airport North 11

== Education ==
Primary schools include:

- Xiwan Primary School (西湾小学)

Schools operated by the Shenzhen Municipal government

- Shenzhen No. 7 Senior High School (深圳市第七高级中学) - Shajing Subdistrict

== See also ==
- Bao'an Stadium
