= Zuopaotai East station =

Shenzhen Metro Line 12 terminus station

Zuopaotai East 左炮台东
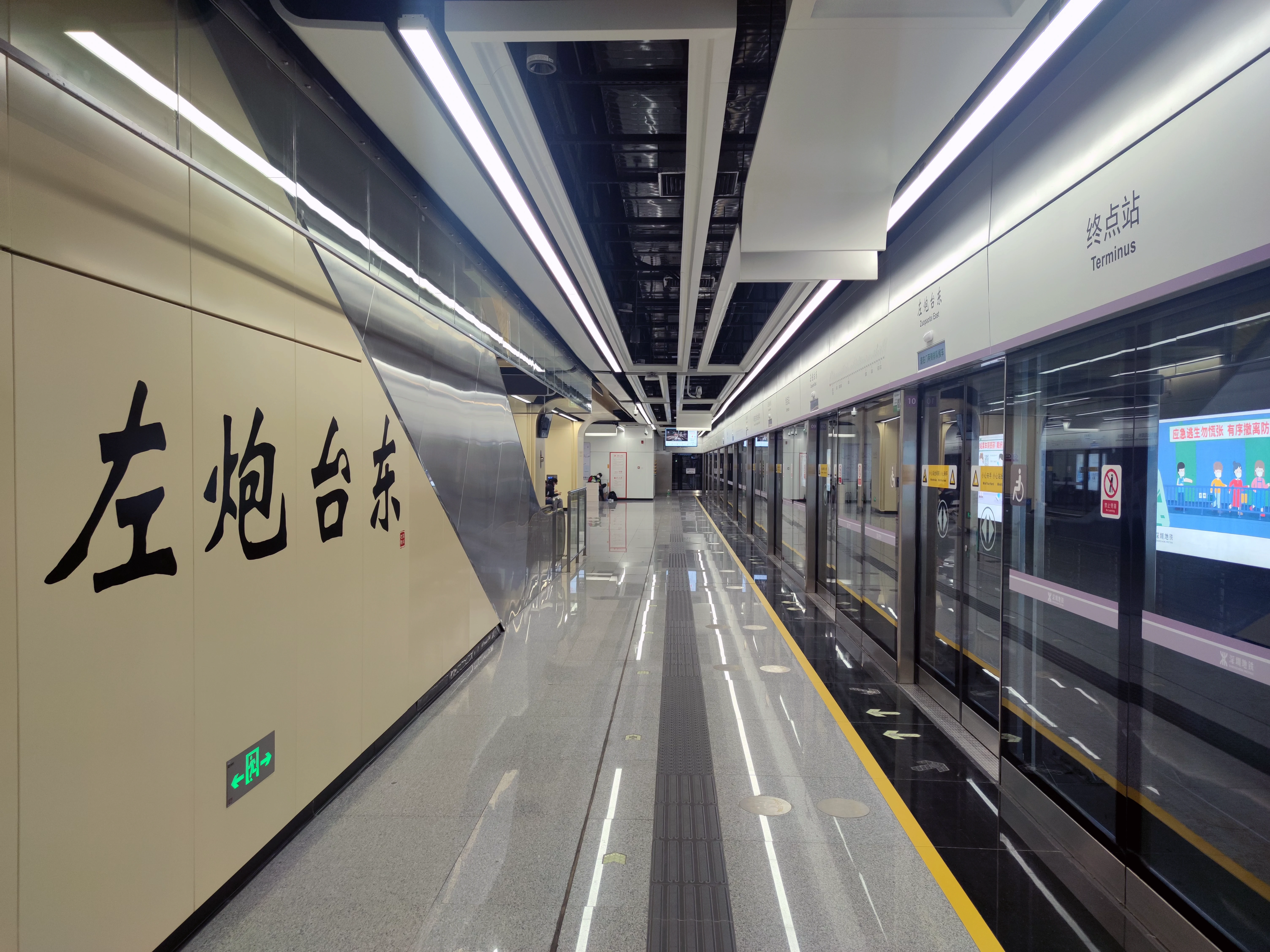
- Platform

Chinese name
- Chinese: 左炮台东
- Literal meaning: Left Fort East
Transcriptions
Standard Mandarin
- Hanyu Pinyin: Zuǒpàotái Dōng
Yue: Cantonese
- Yale Romanization: Jópaautòi Dōng
- Jyutping: Zo2 Paau3 Toi4 Dung1

General information
- Location: East of Chiwan Road and Chiwan Left Fort; Nanshan District, Shenzhen, Guangdong; China
- Coordinates: 22°28′21″N 113°53′33.07″E
- Operated by: Shenzhen Line 12 Rail Transit Co., Ltd (Shenzhen Metro Group and PowerChina PPP)
- Line: Line 12
- Platforms: 2 (1 island platform)
- Tracks: 2

Construction
- Structure type: Underground
- Accessible: Yes

History
- Opened: 28 November 2022 (3 years ago)

Services
Preceding station	Shenzhen Metro	Following station
Taiziwan towards Songgang	Line 12	Terminus
Location

Zuopaotai East station (Chinese: 左炮台东站; pinyin: Zuǒpàotái Dōng Zhàn; Cantonese Yale: Jópaautòi Dōng Jaahm) is the southern terminal metro station on Line 12 of Shenzhen Metro. It was opened on 28 November 2022.

The station is named after the Left Fort which played a critical role in the defense of the Qing troops during the Opium Wars in the 19th century.

== Station layout ==
The station has an island platform under Chiwan Road.

G	–	Exit
B1F; Concourse	Lobby	Ticket Machines, Customer Service, Automatic Vending Machines
B2F; Platforms	Platform	12 towards Songgang (Taiziwan)
B2F; Platforms	Island platform, doors will open on the left
B2F; Platforms	Platform	12 termination platform

=== Entrances/exits ===
The station has 3 points of entry/exit. In its initial opening, the station opened Exit A.

Exit	Destination
Exit A	Chiwan Road (N), Haiwan Road, Racecourse, Wen Tianxiang Memorial Park
Exit B (not open)	Chiwan Road, Haiwan Road, Racecourse, Wen Tianxiang Memorial Park
Exit C (not open)	Chiwan Left Fort

== Gallery ==
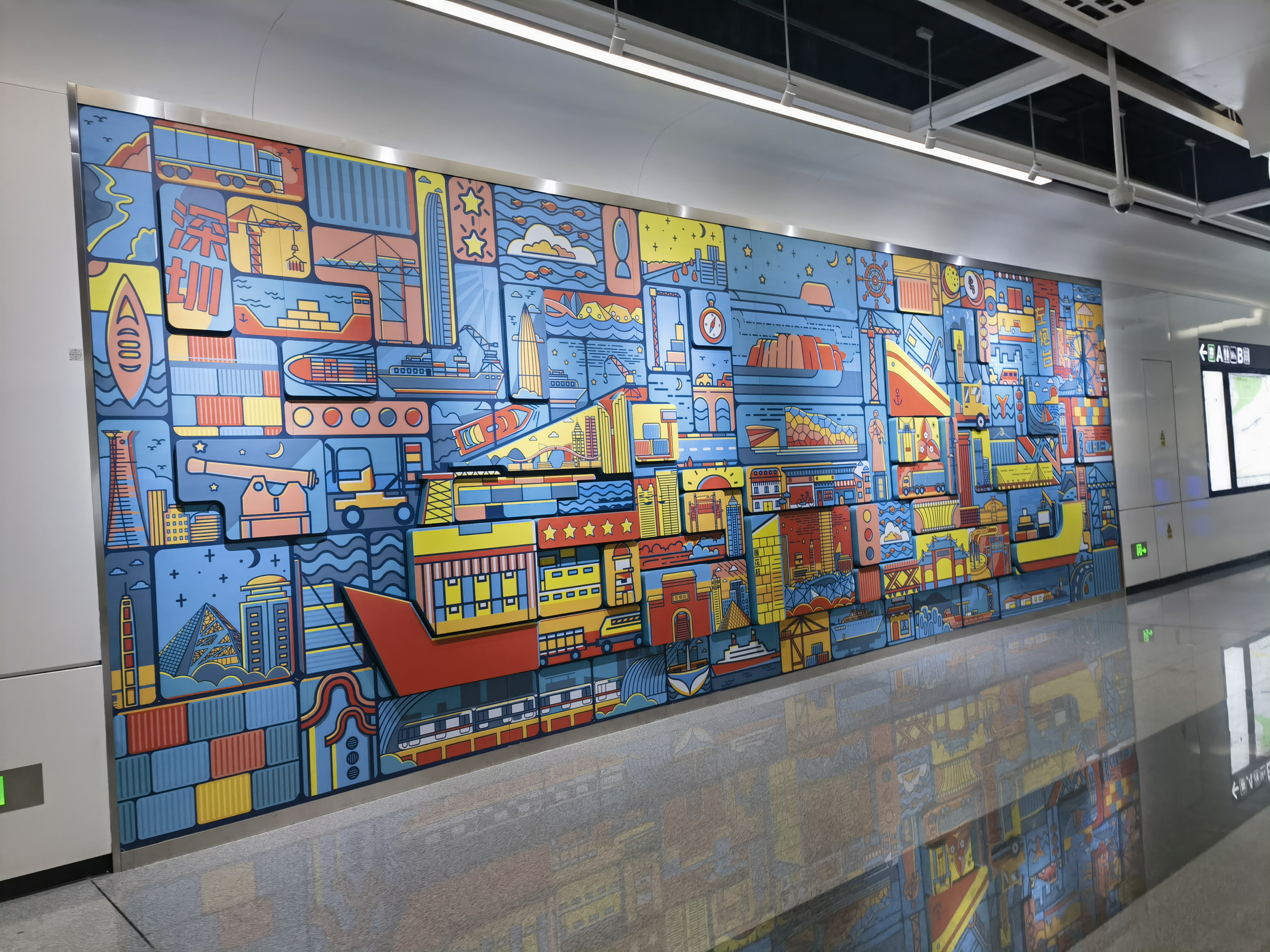
Artwork inside the station "Everything about a Port"

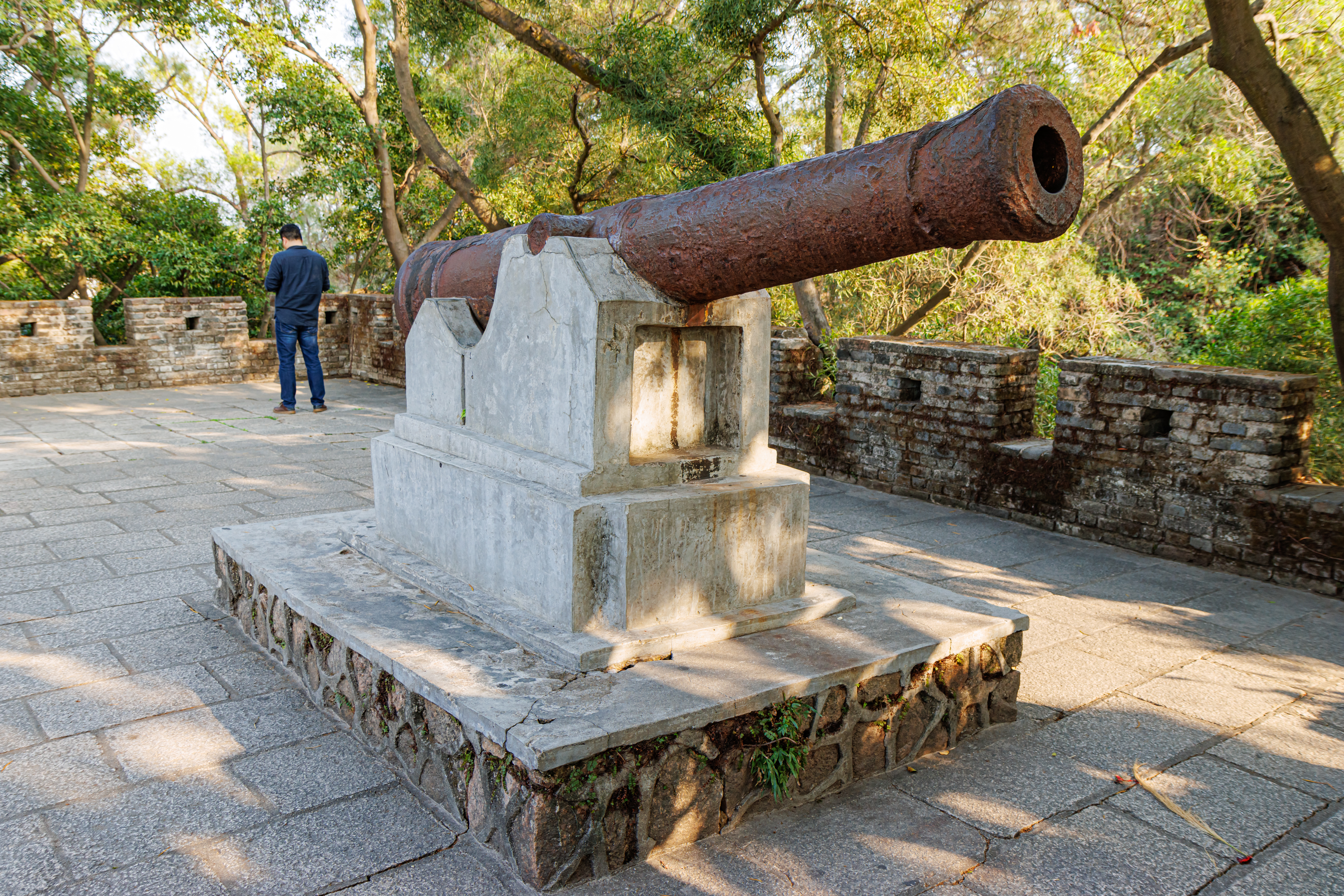
The Chiwan Left Fort close to the station
