= Zhongshan Park station (Shenzhen Metro) =

Shenzhen Metro Line 12 station

Zhongshan Park 中山公园
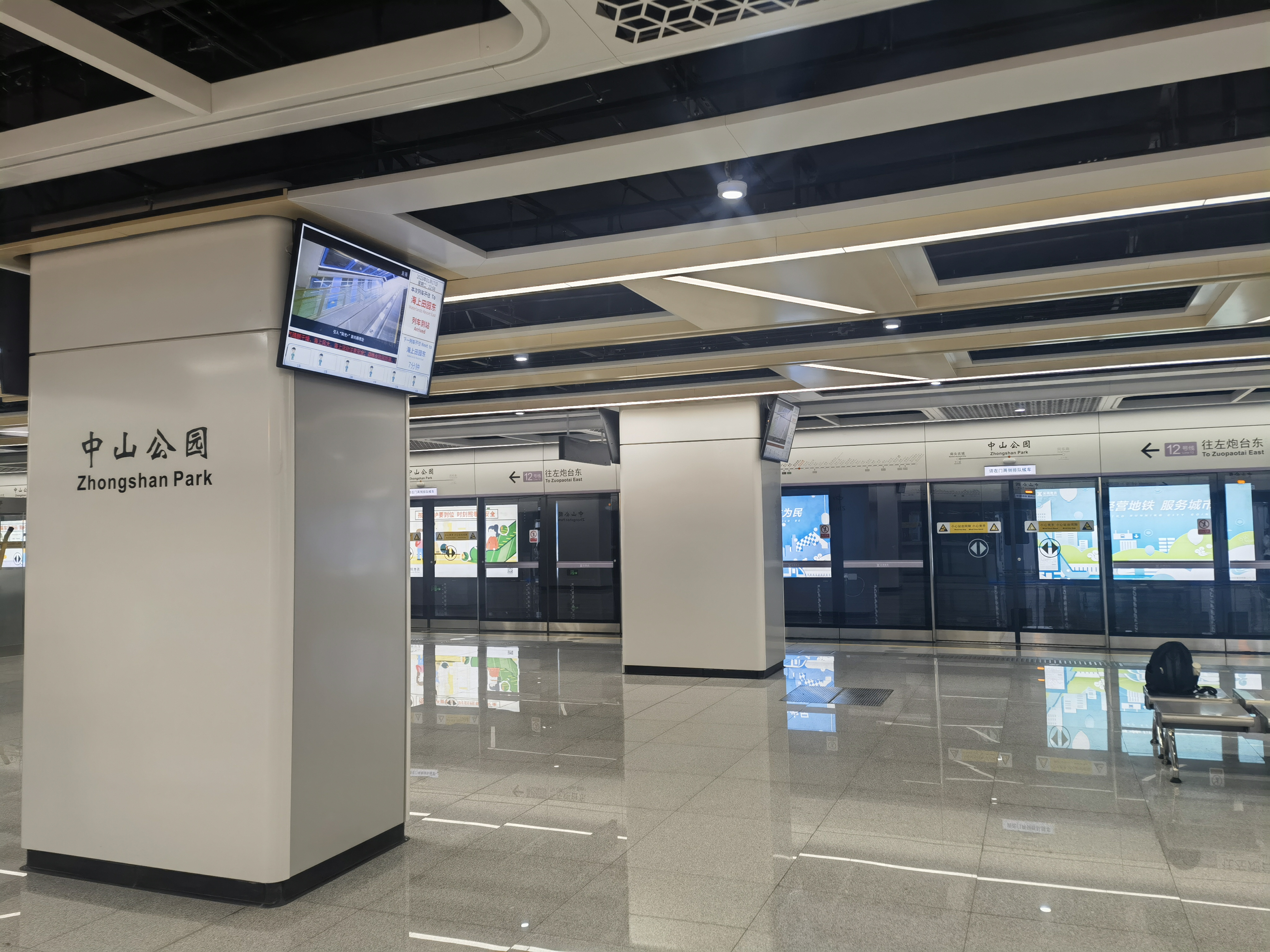
- Platform

Chinese name
- Traditional Chinese: 中山公園
- Simplified Chinese: 中山公园
Transcriptions
Standard Mandarin
- Hanyu Pinyin: Zhōngshān Gōngyuán
Yue: Cantonese
- Yale Romanization: Jūngsāan Gūng'yún
- Jyutping: Zung1 Saan1 Gung1 Jyun4

General information
- Location: Intersection of Nanshan Boulevard and Yuquan Road; Nanshan District, Shenzhen, Guangdong; China
- Coordinates: 22°32′58.78″N 113°55′6.46″E
- Operated by: Shenzhen Line 12 Rail Transit Co., Ltd (Shenzhen Metro Group and PowerChina PPP)
- Line: Line 12
- Platforms: 2 (1 island platform)
- Tracks: 2

Construction
- Structure type: Underground
- Accessible: Yes

History
- Opened: 28 November 2022 (3 years ago)

Services
Preceding station	Shenzhen Metro	Following station
Tongle South towards Songgang	Line 12	Nantou Ancient City towards Zuopaotai East
Location

Zhongshan Park station (simplified Chinese: 中山公园; traditional Chinese: 中山公園; pinyin: Zhōngshān Gōngyuán; Cantonese Yale: Jūngsāan Gūng'yún) is a metro station on Line 12 of Shenzhen Metro. It opened on 28 November 2022.

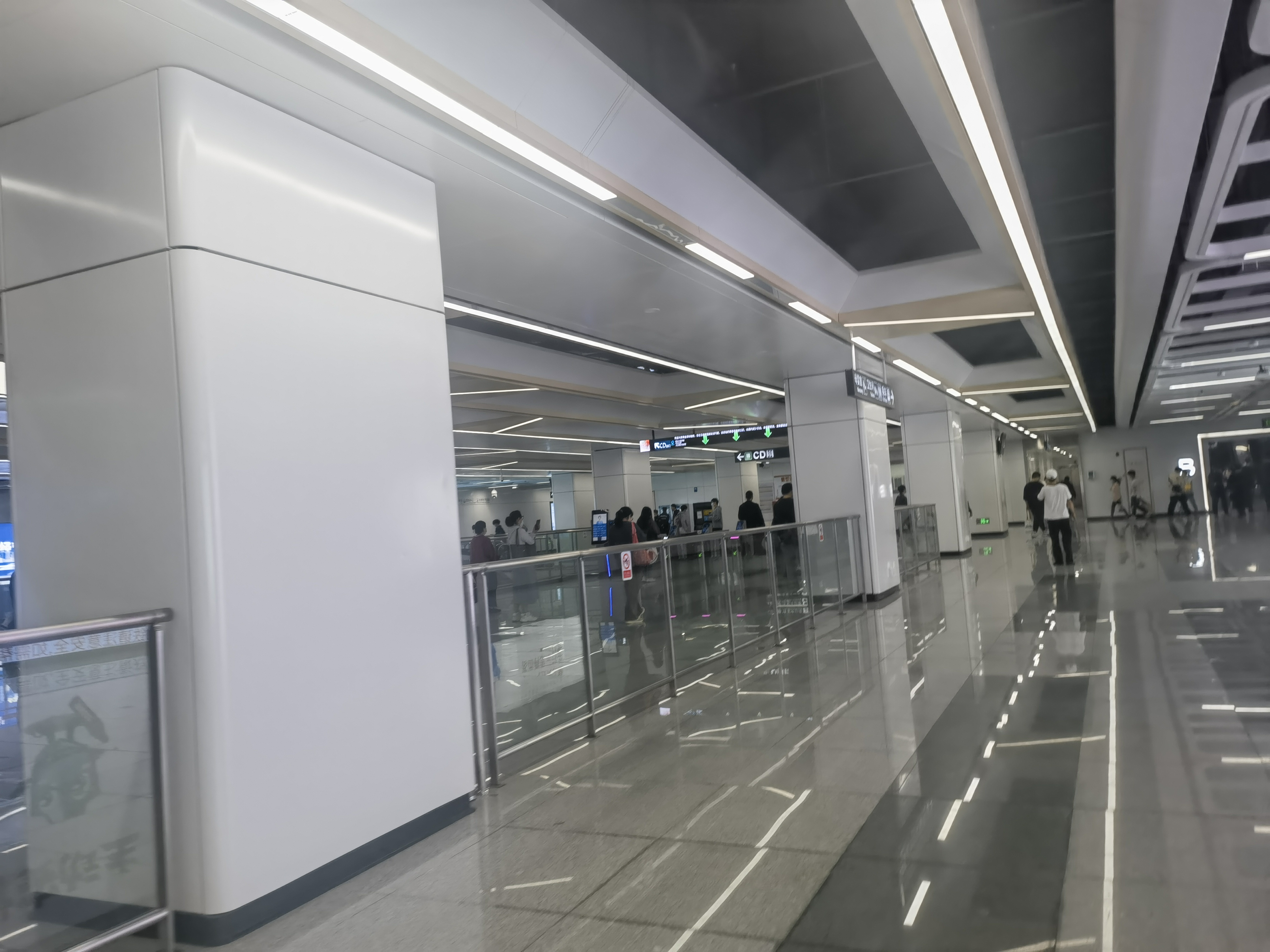
Concourse

== Station layout ==
The station has an island platform under Nanshan Boulevard.

G	–	Exits A-D
B1F; Concourse	Lobby	Ticket Machines, Customer Service, Station Control Room
B2F; Platforms	Platform	12 towards Songgang (Tongle South)
B2F; Platforms	Island platform, doors will open on the left
B2F; Platforms	Platform	12 towards Zuopaotai East (Nantou Ancient City)

=== Entrances/exits ===
The station has 4 points of entry/exit, with Exit B being accessible via elevator.

Exit	Destination
Exit A	Nanshan Boulevard (E), Zhongshan Orchard, Kirin Secondary School
Exit B	Nanshan Boulevard (E), Majialong Industrial Zone
Exit C	Nanshan Boulevard (W), Zhongshan Park
Exit D	Nanshan Boulevard (W), Nantou Ancient City, St. Paul's Catholic Church in Shenzhen

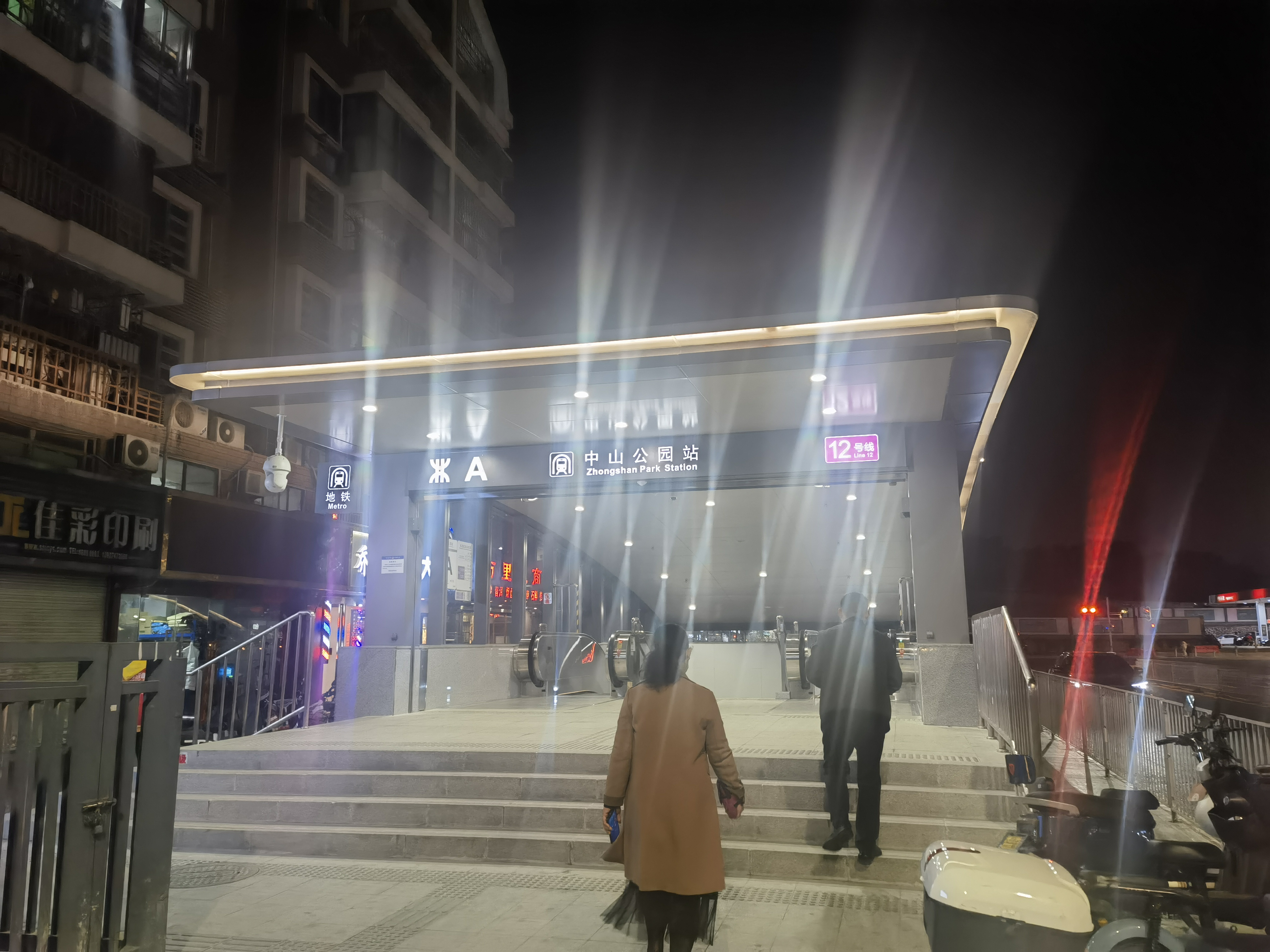
Entrance A

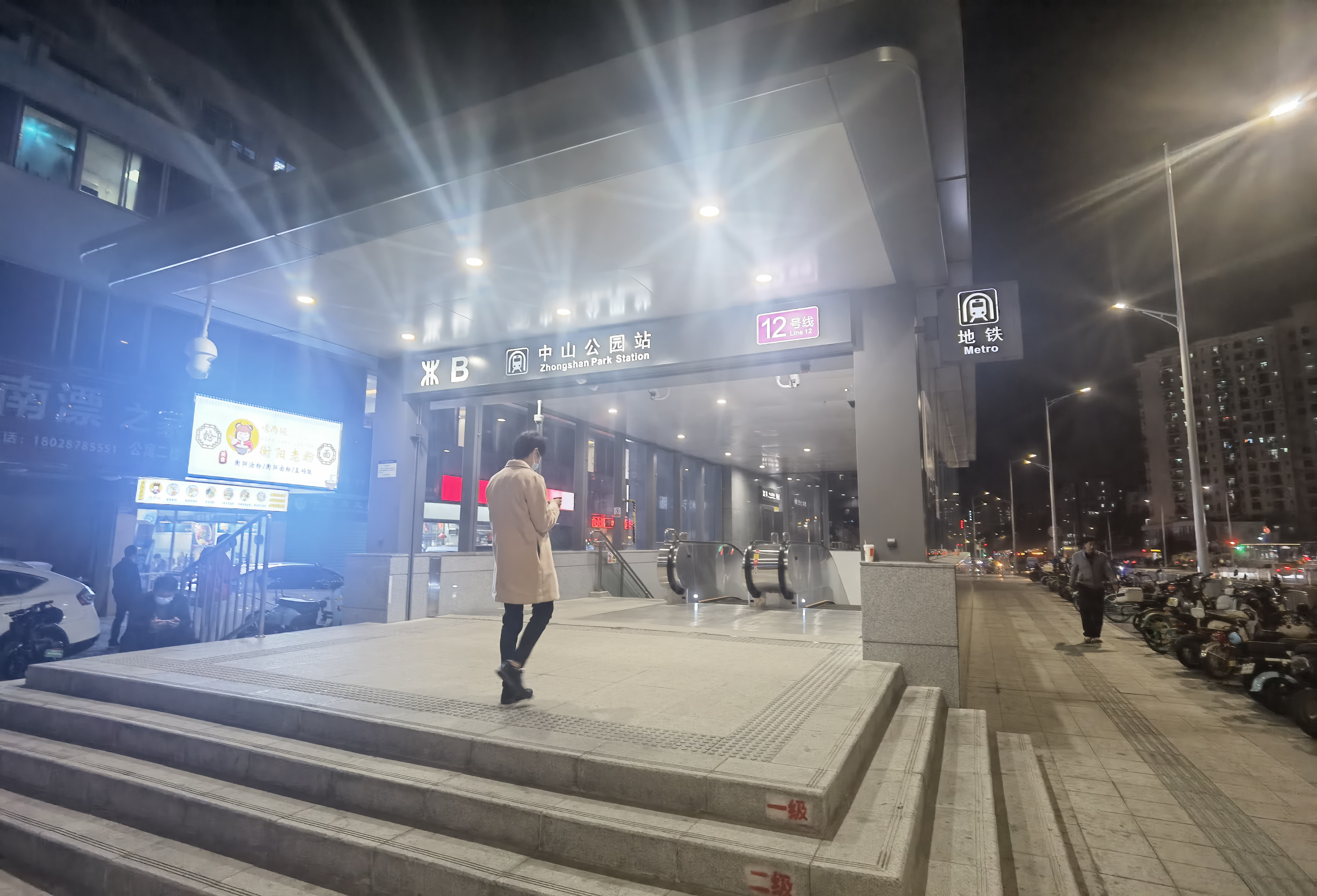
Entrance B
