= Nantou Ancient City station =

Shenzhen Metro Line 12 station

Nantou Ancient City 南头古城
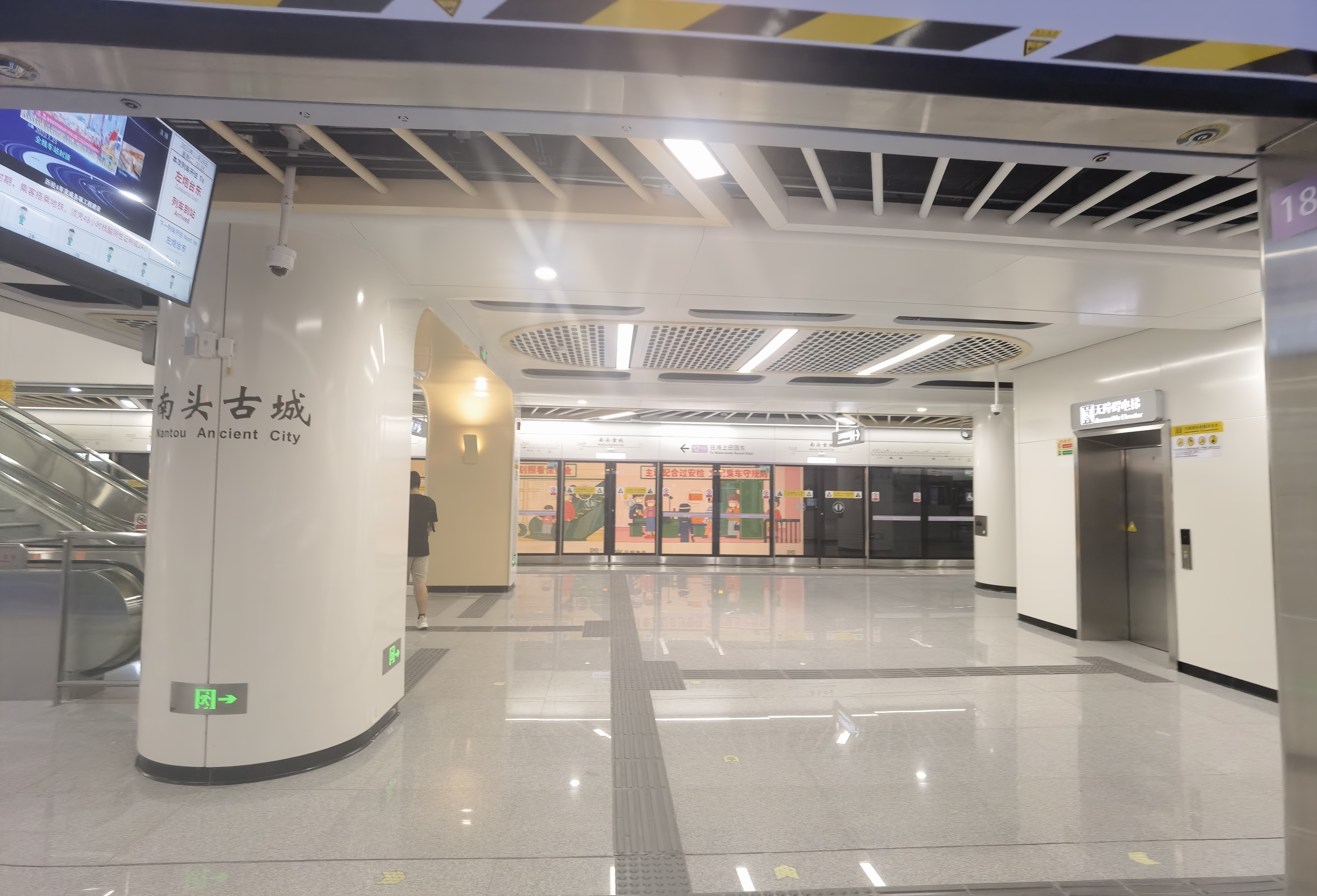
- Platform

Chinese name
- Traditional Chinese: 南頭古城
- Simplified Chinese: 南头古城
Transcriptions
Standard Mandarin
- Hanyu Pinyin: Nántóu Gǔchéng
Yue: Cantonese
- Yale Romanization: Nàahmtàuh Gúsìhng
- Jyutping: Namm4 Tau4 Gu2 Sing4

General information
- Location: Intersection of Nanshan Boulevard and Shennan Road; Nanshan District, Shenzhen, Guangdong; China
- Coordinates: 22°32′33.29″N 113°55′8.65″E
- Operator: Shenzhen Line 12 Rail Transit Co., Ltd (Shenzhen Metro Group and PowerChina PPP)
- Line: Line 12
- Platforms: 2 (1 island platform)
- Tracks: 2

Construction
- Structure type: Underground
- Accessible: Yes

History
- Opened: 28 November 2022 (3 years ago)

Services
Preceding station	Shenzhen Metro	Following station
Zhongshan Park towards Songgang	Line 12	Taoyuan towards Zuopaotai East
Location

Nantou Ancient City station (simplified Chinese: 南头古城站; traditional Chinese: 南頭古城站; pinyin: Nántóu Gǔchéng Zhàn; Cantonese Yale: Nàahmtàuh Gúsìhng Jaahm) is a metro station on Line 12 of Shenzhen Metro. It opened on 28 November 2022.

== Station layout ==
The station has an island platform under Nanshan Boulevard.

G	–	Exits A, C-F
B1F; Concourse	Lobby	Ticket Machines, Customer Service, Station Control Room
B2F; Platforms	Platform	12 towards Songgang (Zhongshan Park)
B2F; Platforms	Island platform, doors will open on the left
B2F; Platforms	Platform	12 towards Zuopaotai East (Taoyuan)

=== Entrances/exits ===
The station has 8 points of entry/exit. Exits C and E are accessible via elevators.

Exit	Destination
Exit A	Shennan Road (S), Nanshan Boulevard (E), Lilin Chunxiao, Lilin Park, Nanshan Branch of Shenzhen Public Security Bureau
Exit C	Shennan Road (N), Nanshan Boulevard (W), Nantou Ancient City, Nantou Elementary School
Exit D	Shennan Road (S), Nanshan Boulevard (E)
Exit E	Shennan Road, Nanshan Boulevard
Exit F	Shennan Road, Nanshan Boulevard

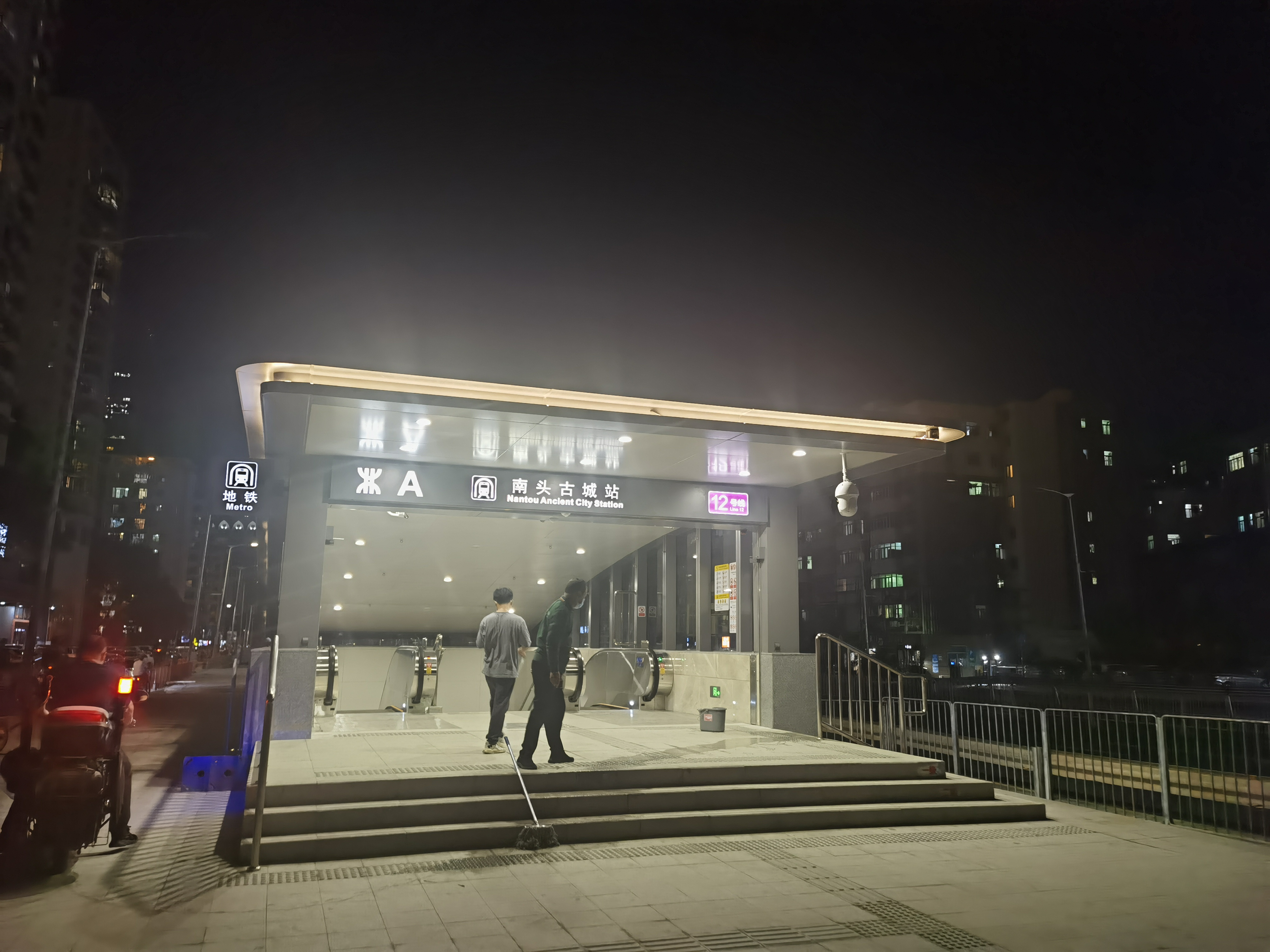
Entrance A

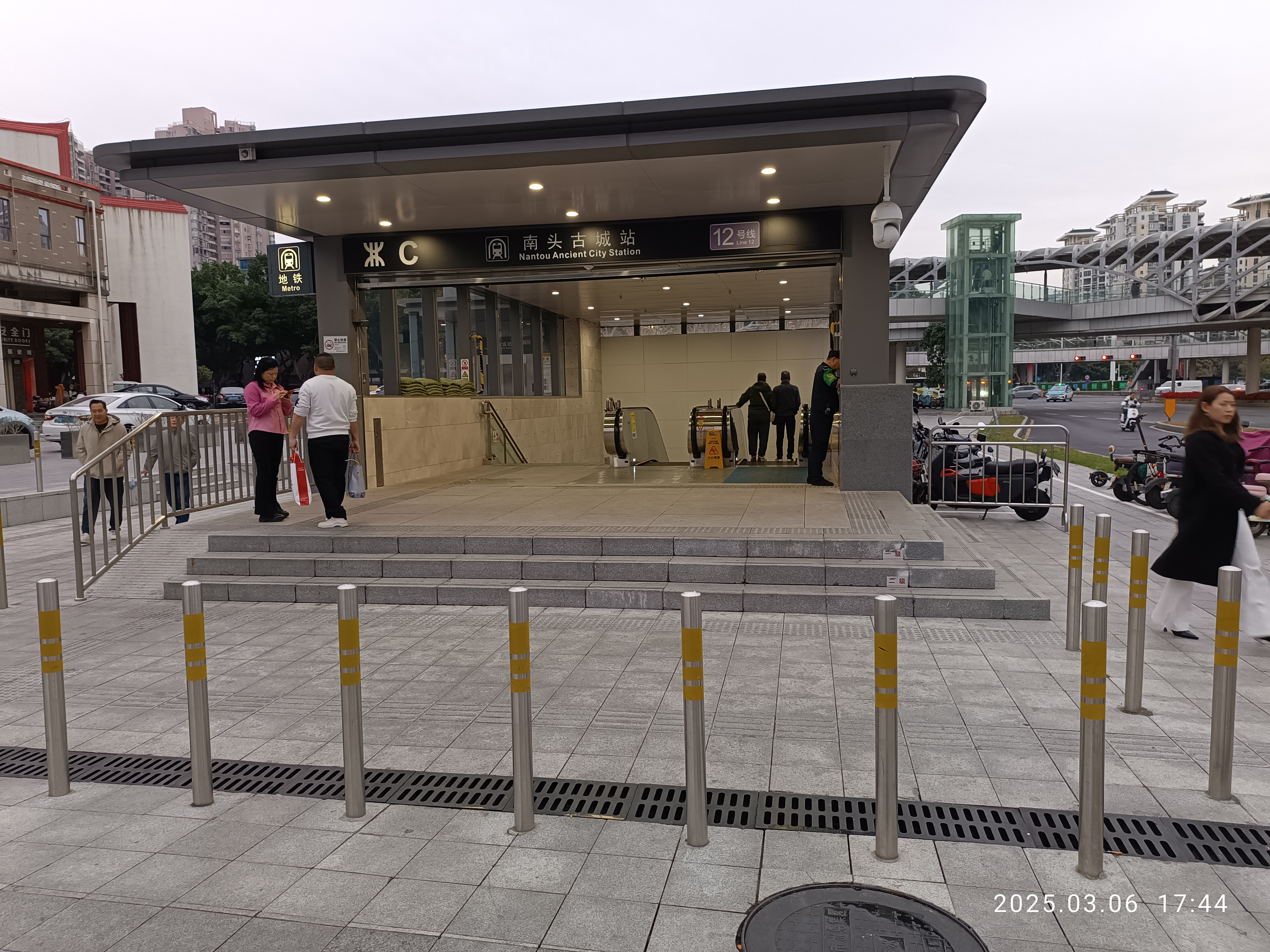
Entrance C

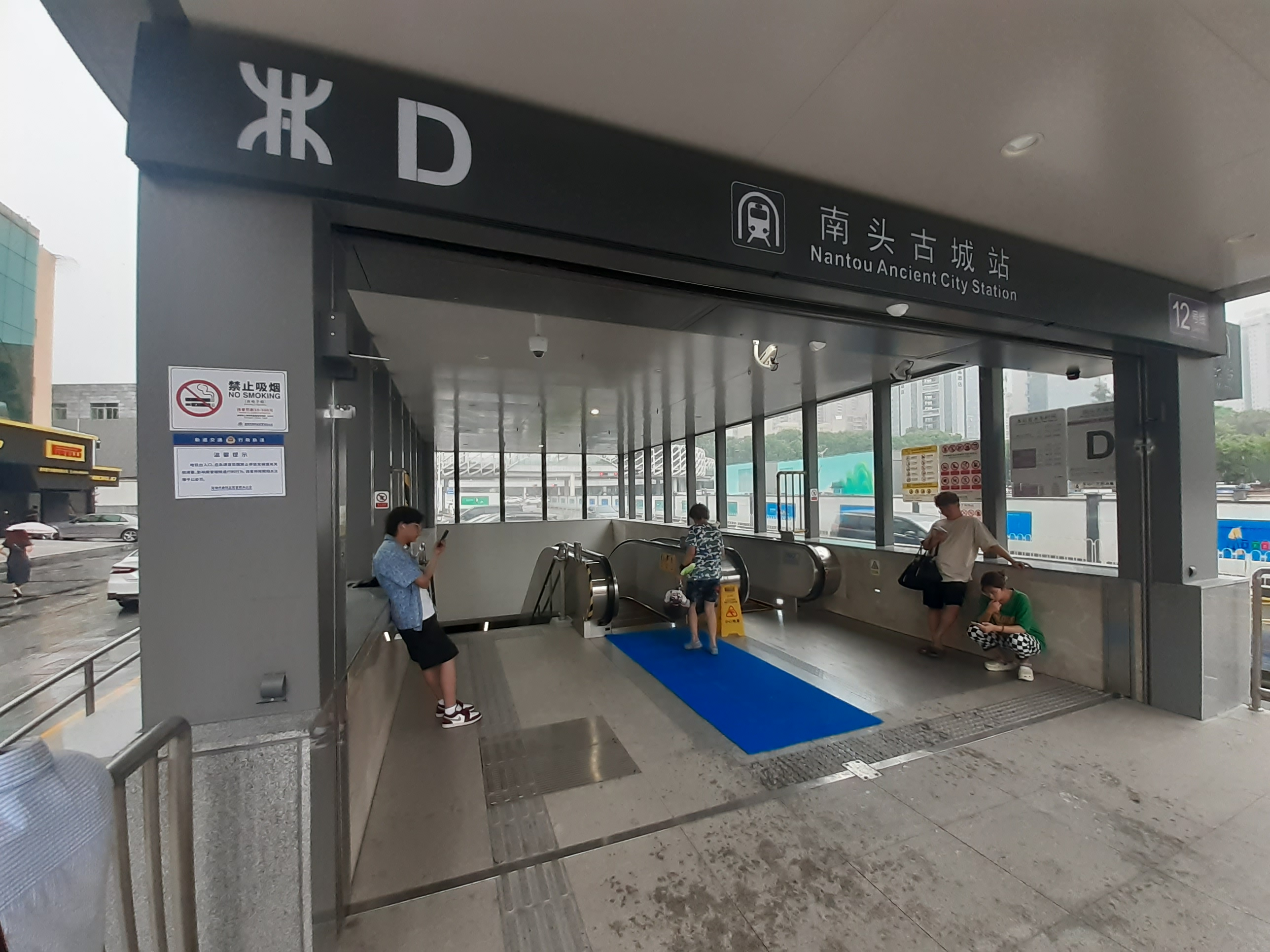
Entrance D

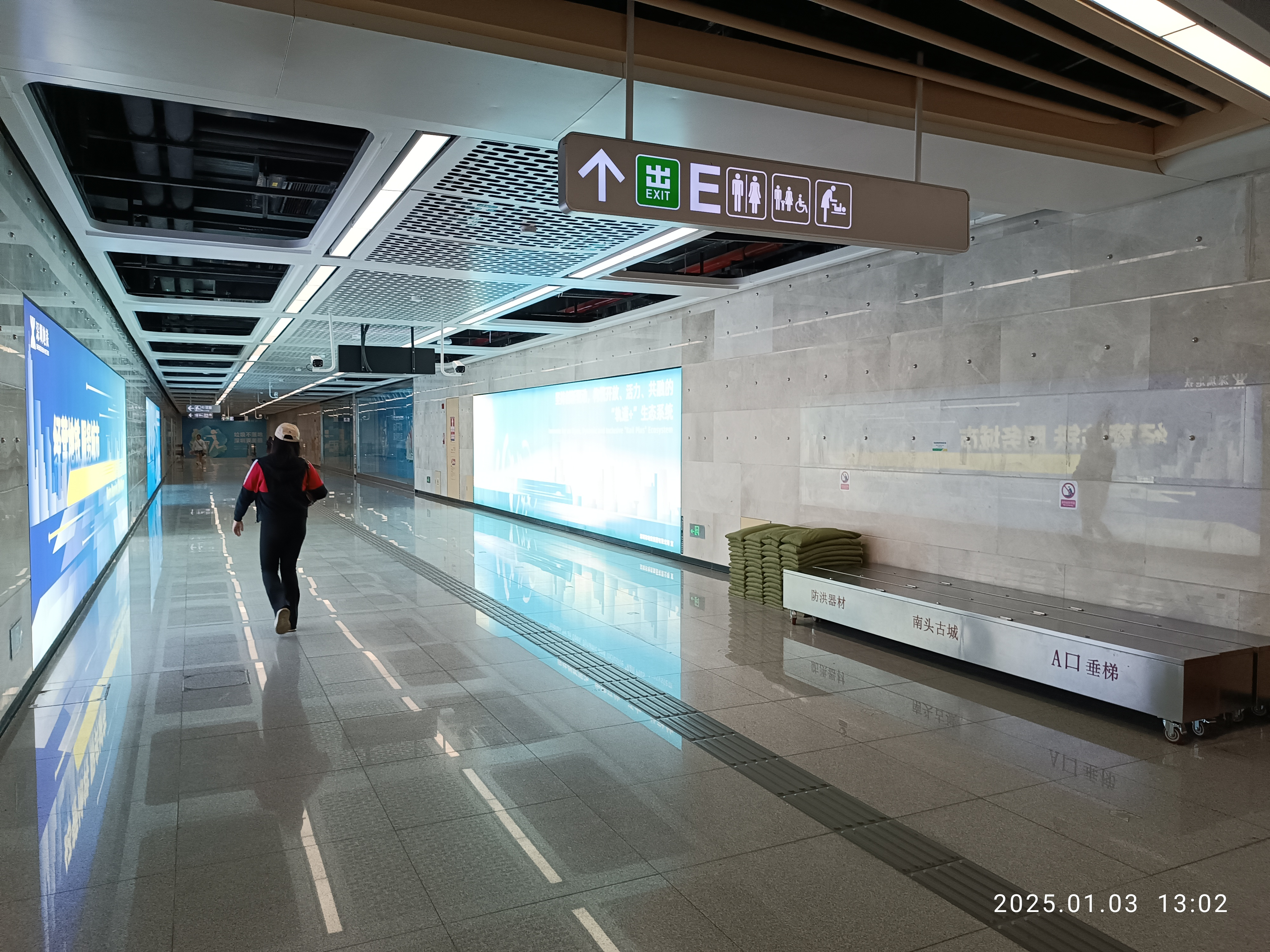
Entrance E

== Future development ==
In 2028, this station will feature an interchange with Line 20.
