= Taoyuan station (Shenzhen Metro) =

Shenzhen Metro Line 1 and Line 12 station

Taoyuan 桃园
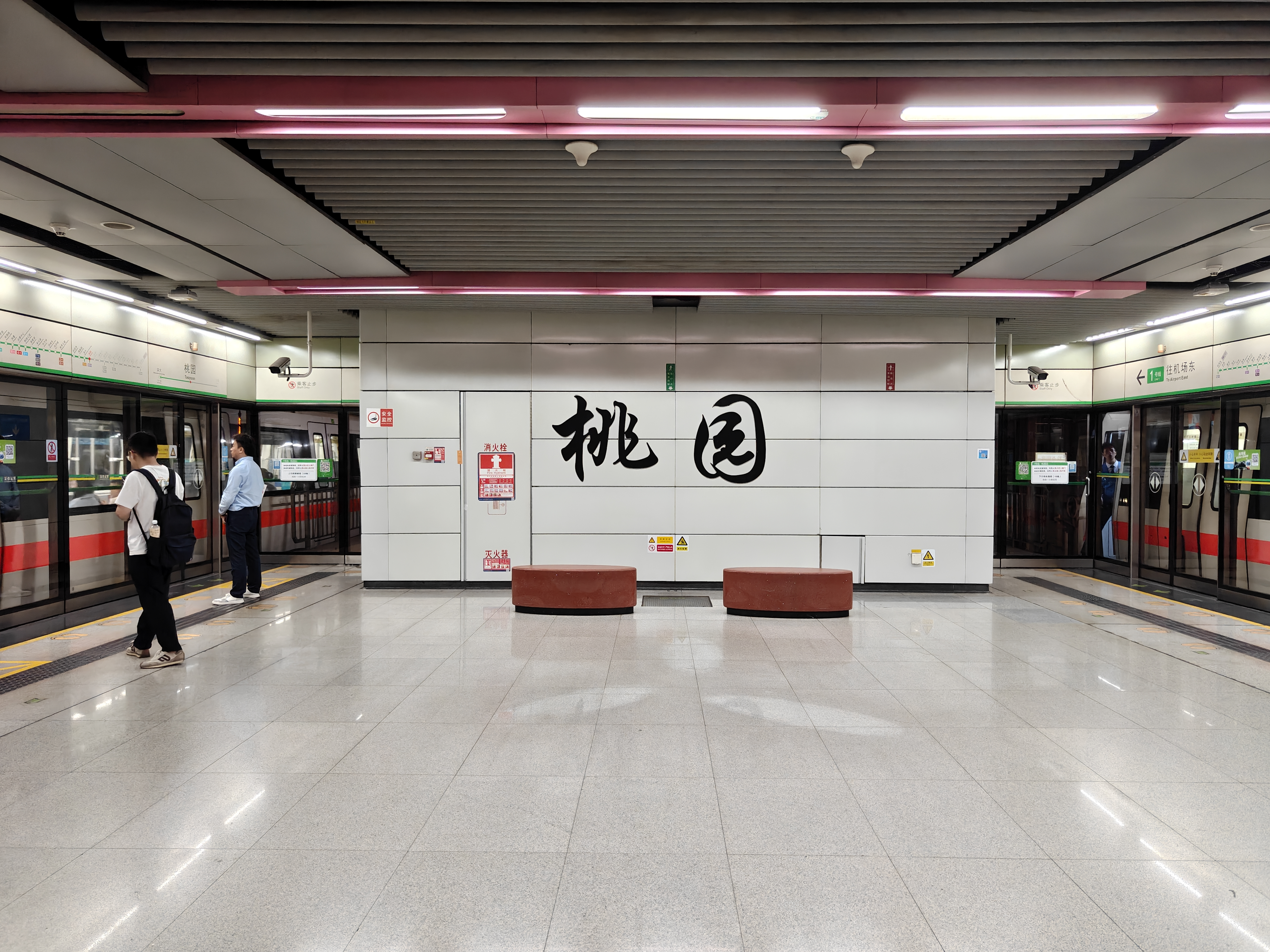
- Line 1 platform

Chinese name
- Traditional Chinese: 桃園
- Simplified Chinese: 桃园
- Literal meaning: Peach Garden
Transcriptions
Standard Mandarin
- Hanyu Pinyin: Táoyuán
Yue: Cantonese
- Yale Romanization: Tohyùhn
- Jyutping: Tou4 Jyun4

General information
- Location: Intersection of Taoyuan Road and Nanshan Boulevard; Nanshan District, Shenzhen, Guangdong; China
- Coordinates: 22°32′3″N 113°54′57″E
- Operator: SZMC (Shenzhen Metro Group); Shenzhen Line 12 Rail Transit Co., Ltd (Shenzhen Metro Group and PowerChina PPP)
- Lines: Line 1 Line 12
- Platforms: 4 (2 island platforms)
- Tracks: 4

Construction
- Structure type: Underground
- Accessible: Yes

Other information
- Station code: 112 (Line 1); 1230(Line 12)

History
- Opened: Line 1: 15 June 2011 (15 years ago); Line 12: 28 November 2022 (3 years ago)

Services
Preceding station	Shenzhen Metro	Following station
Daxin towards Airport East	Line 1	Shenzhen University towards Luohu
Nantou Ancient City towards Songgang	Line 12	Nanshan towards Zuopaotai East
Route map
Location

Taoyuan station (simplified Chinese: 桃园站; traditional Chinese: 桃園站; pinyin: Táoyuán Zhàn; Jyutping: Tou4 Jyun4 Zaam6; Cantonese Yale: Tohyùhn Jaahm), is an interchange station for Line 1 and Line 12 of Shenzhen Metro in Shenzhen, Guangdong Province, China. Line 1 platforms opened on 15 June 2011 and Line 12 platforms opened on 28 November 2022.

== Station layout ==
G	-	Exit
B1F; Concourse	Lobby	Ticket Machines, Customer Service, Station Control Room
B2F; 1 Platforms	Platform	1 towards Airport East (Daxin)
B2F; 1 Platforms	Island platform, doors will open on the left
B2F; 1 Platforms	Platform	1 Line 1 towards Luohu (Shenzhen University)
B3F; 12 Platforms	Platform	12 towards Songgang (Nantou Ancient City)
B3F; 12 Platforms	Island platform, doors will open on the left
B3F; 12 Platforms	Platform	12 towards Zuopaotai East (Nanshan)

== Gallery ==
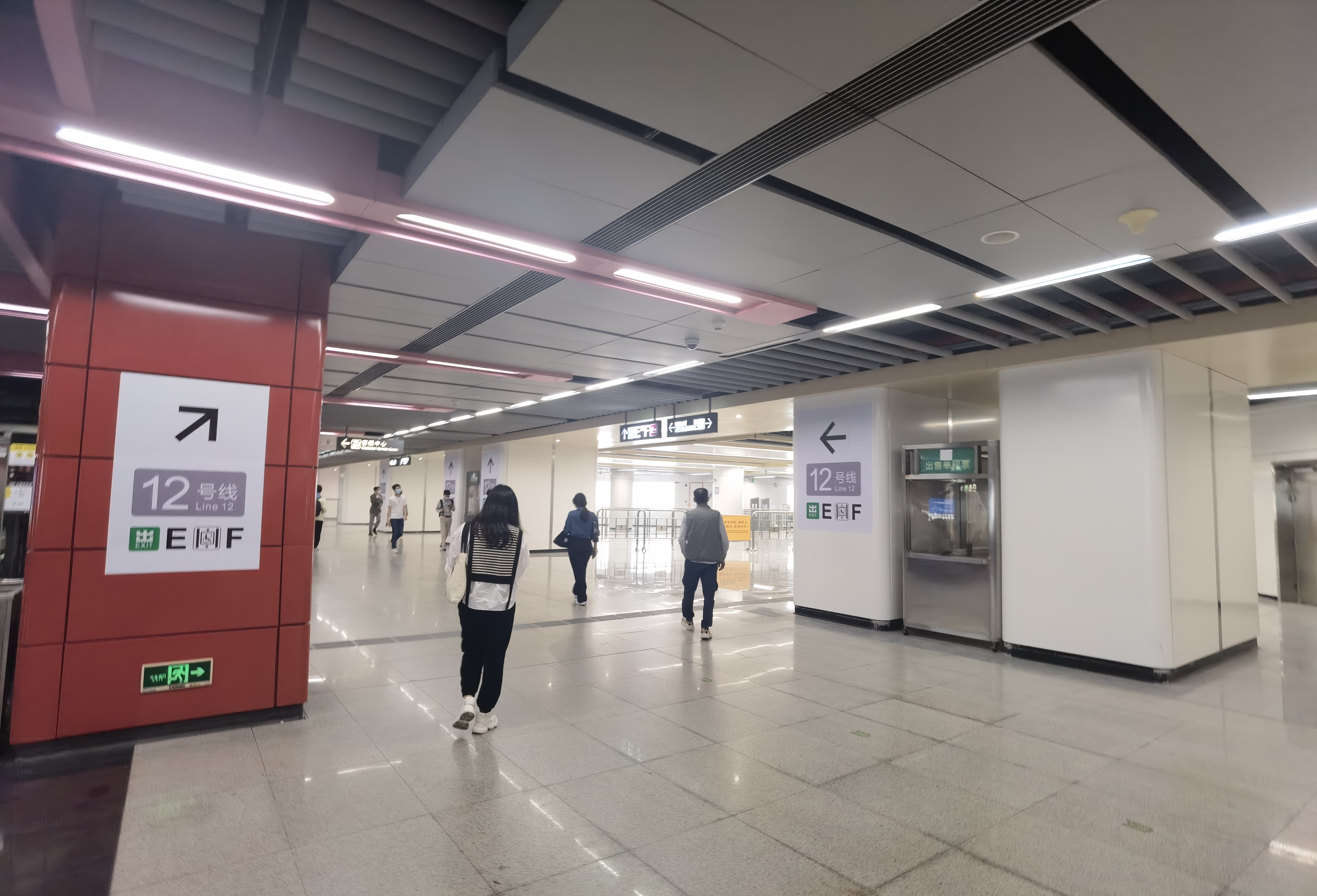
Line 1 concourse and transfer passageway

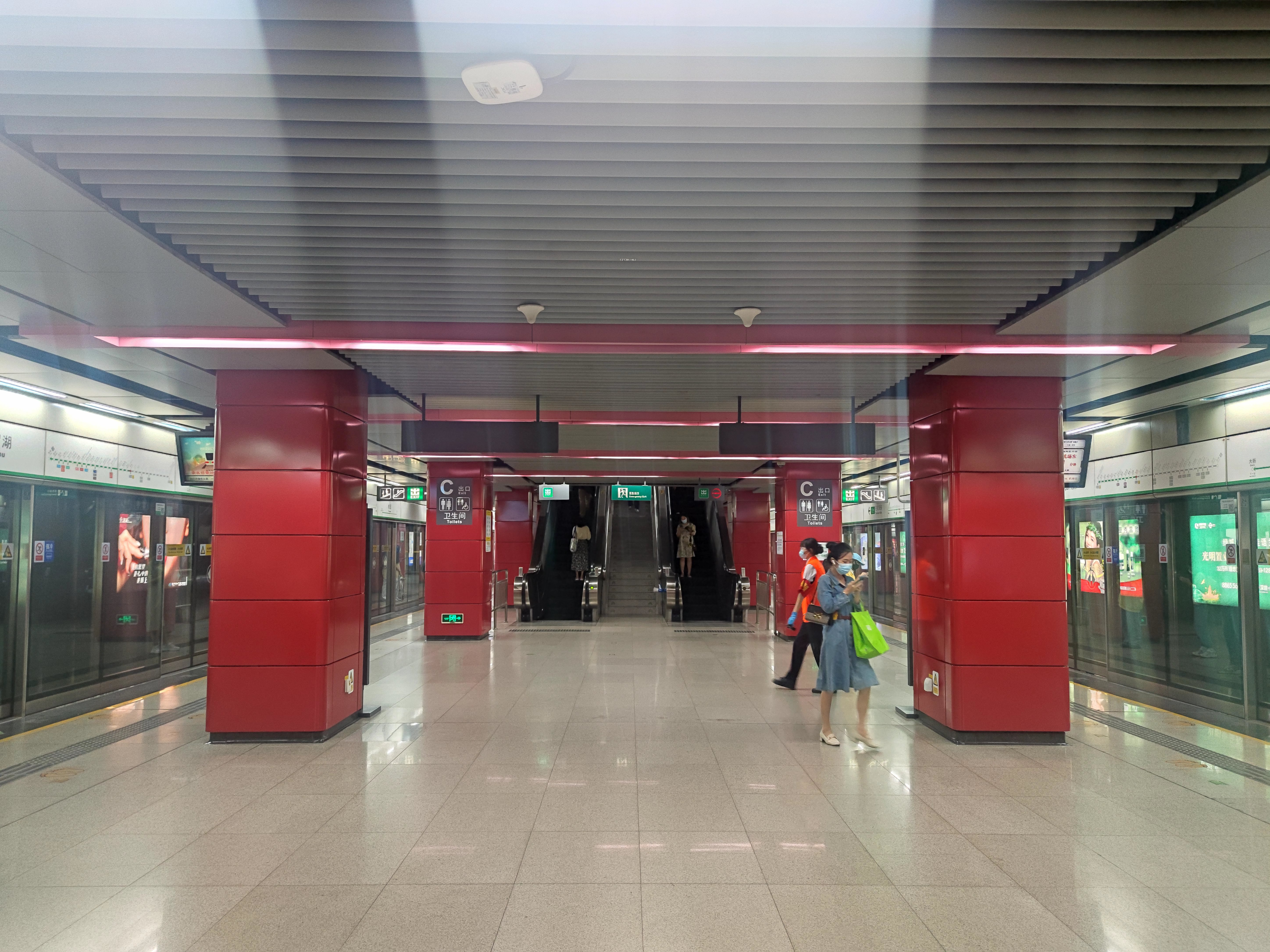
Line 1 platform

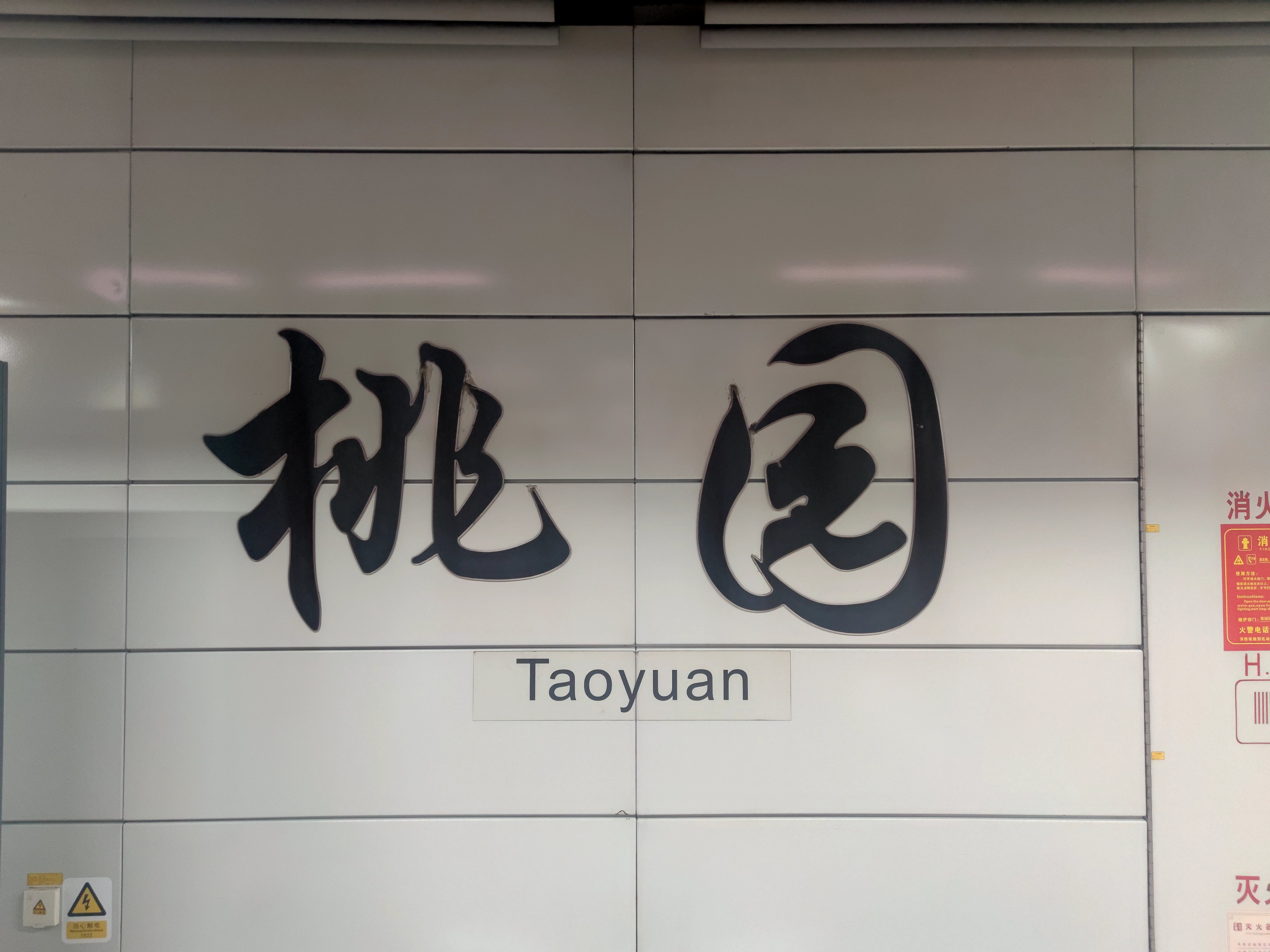
Line 1 calligraphy

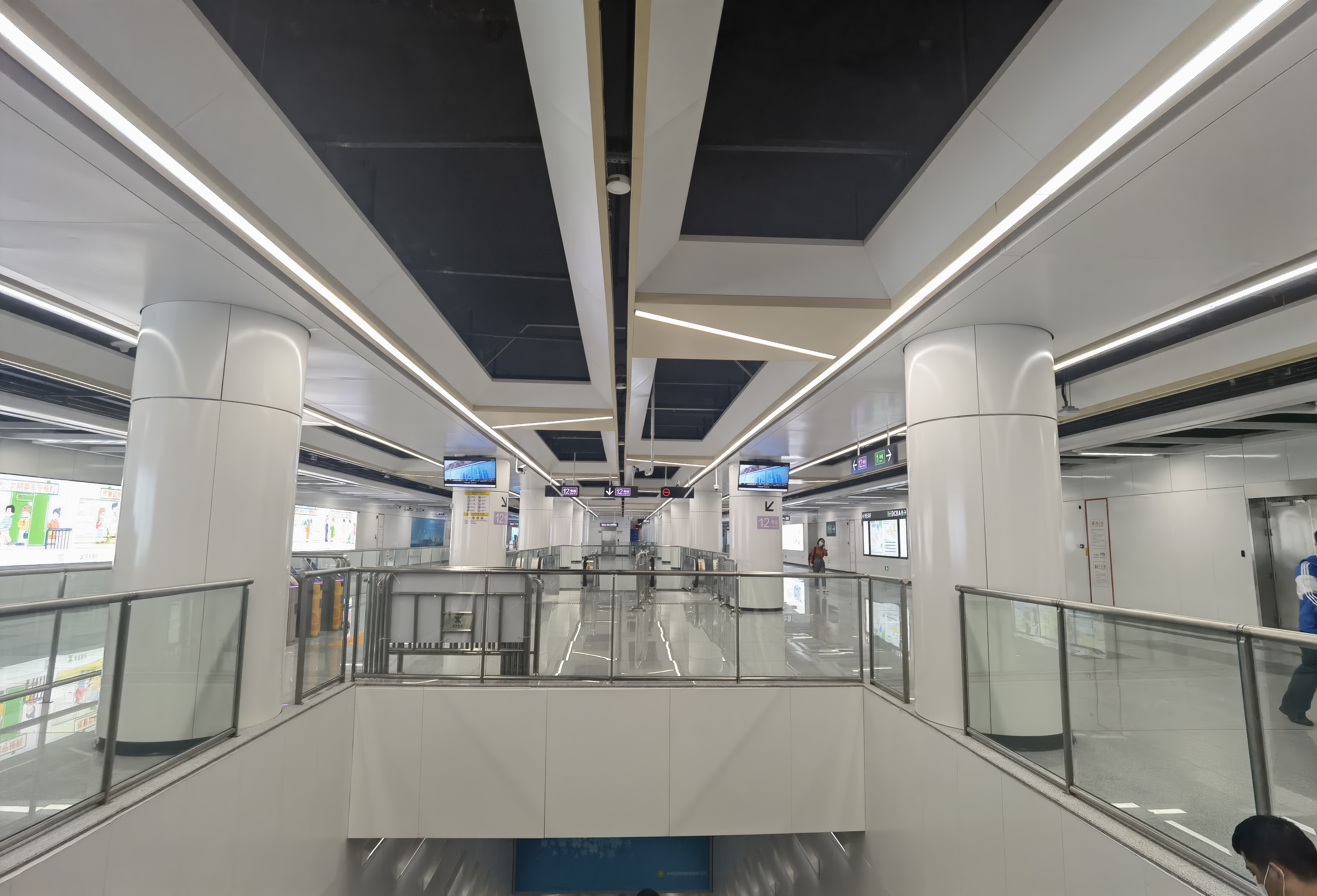
Line 12 concourse

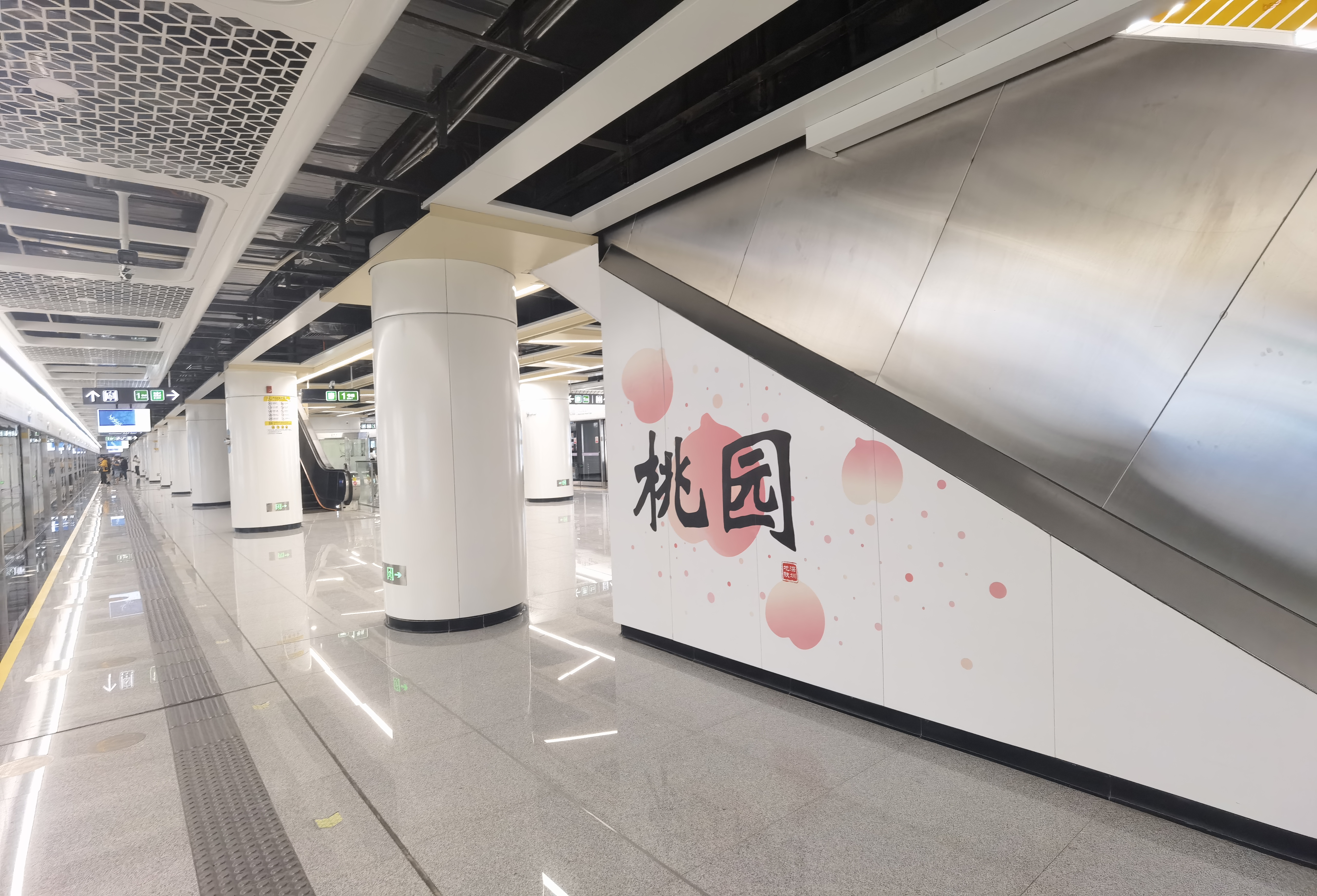
Line 12 platform

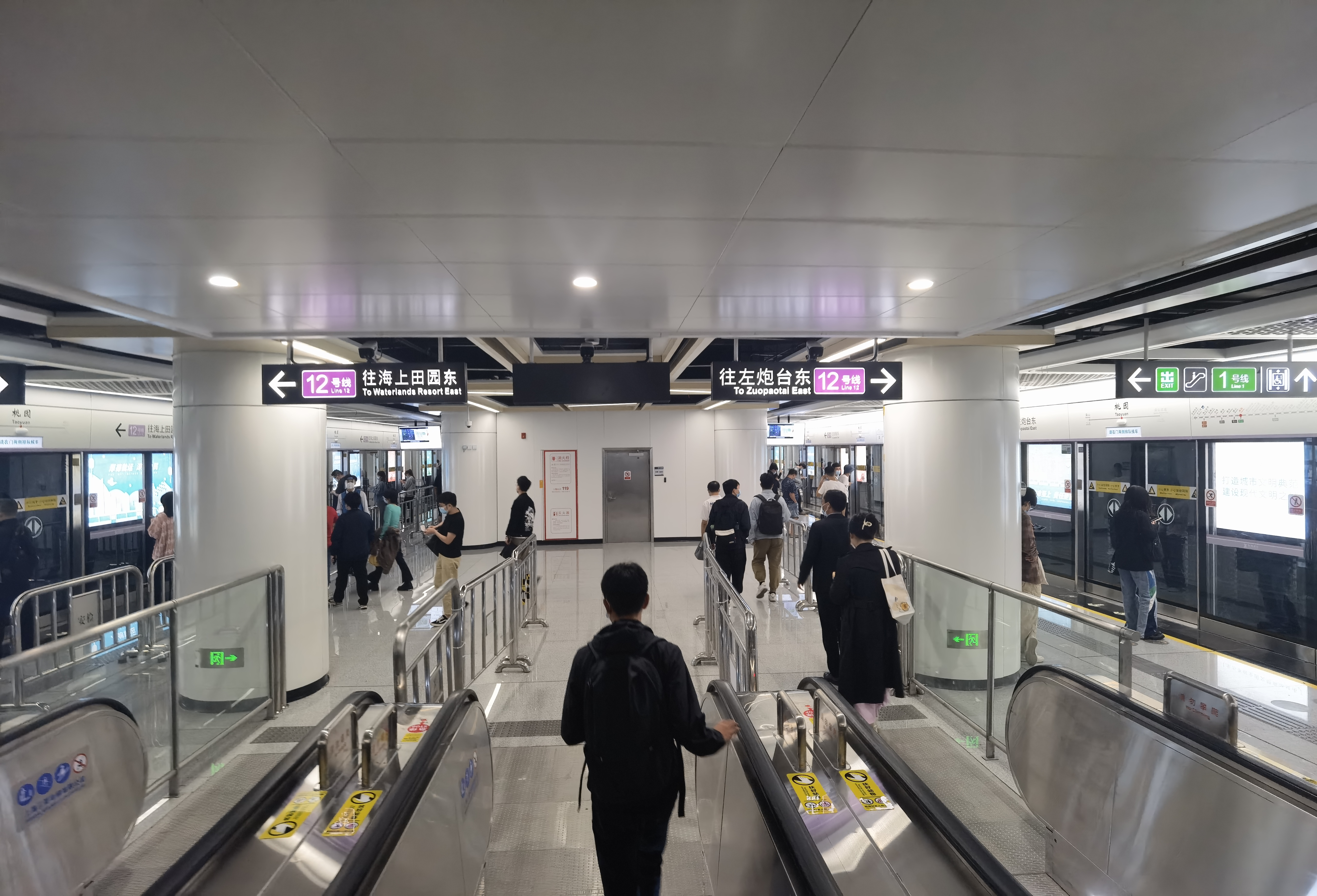
Line 12 platform view from escalator

=== Entrances/exits ===
The Line 1 station has 4 points of entry/exit, with Exit C being accessible via elevator and having toilets. The Line 12 station has 2 points of entry/exit, with Exit E being accessible via elevator.

Exit	Destination
Exit A	Taoyuan Road (N), Nanguang Road, Nanshan District Committee of Shenzhen Municipal Committee of the CPC, Shenzhen Nanshan Shiyan School, Lixiang Park, Shenzhen Nanshan District People’s Procuratorate, Shenzhen Nanshan District People’s Government, Shenzhen University, Nanhai Avenue
Exit B	Taoyuan Road (N), Changxing Rainbow Department Store, Nanshan District Library, Nanshan Culture & Sports Center, Nanshan Cultural & Sports Center Gymnasium
Exit C	Taoyuan Road (S), Shenzhen Nanshan District People's Hospital (The Sixth People's Hospital of Shenzhen)
Exit D	Nanshan Avenue (E), Xuefu Road, Nanshan Inter-city Bus Station
Exit E	Nanshan Avenue (W), Yukang Building, Huaqiao New Estate, Yukang Garden
Exit F	Nanshan Avenue (S), Nanshan District People's Hospital, Lixin Village, Taoyuan Community, Liyuan Community, Shenzhen (Nanshan) Sino-Canadian School

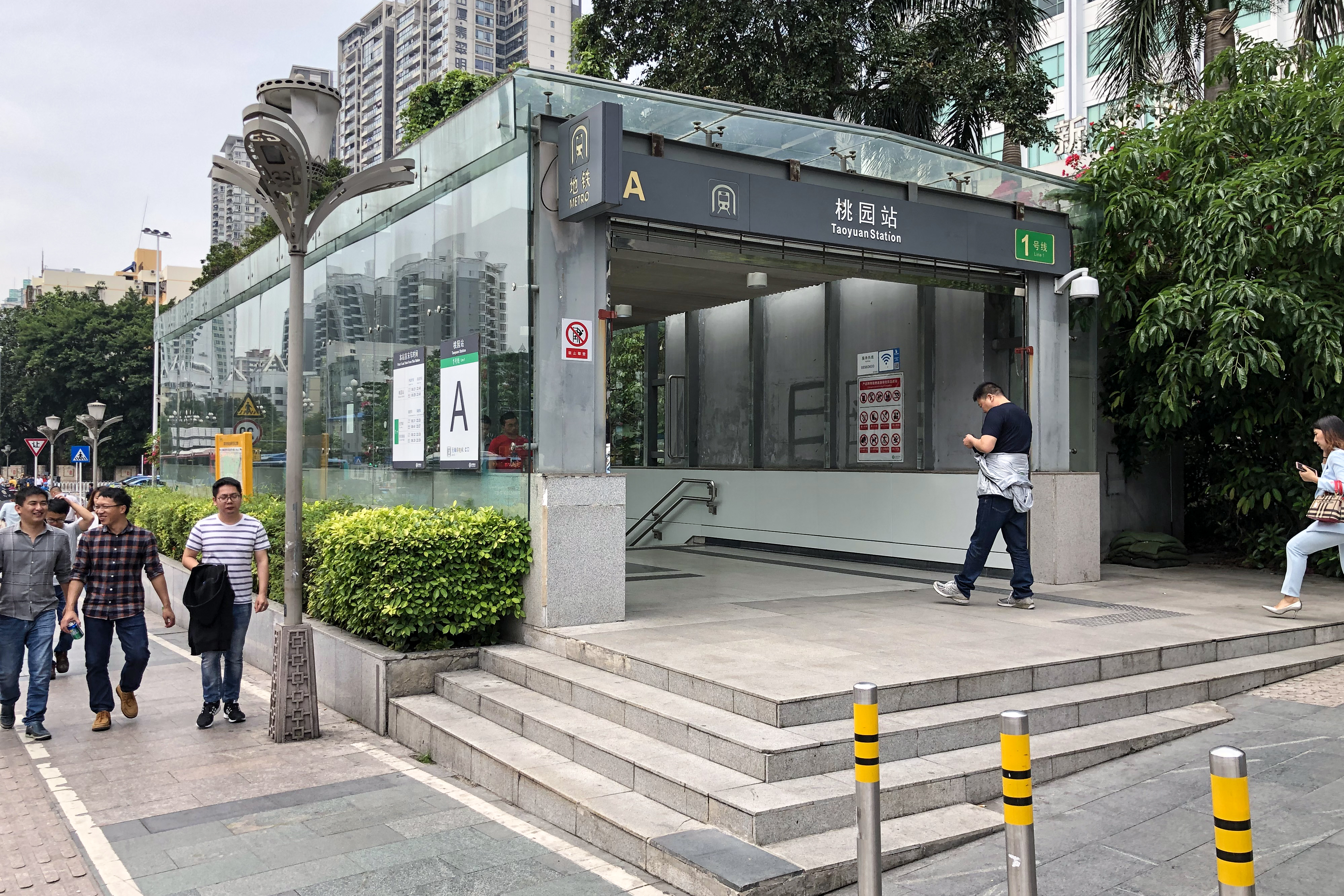
Entrance A

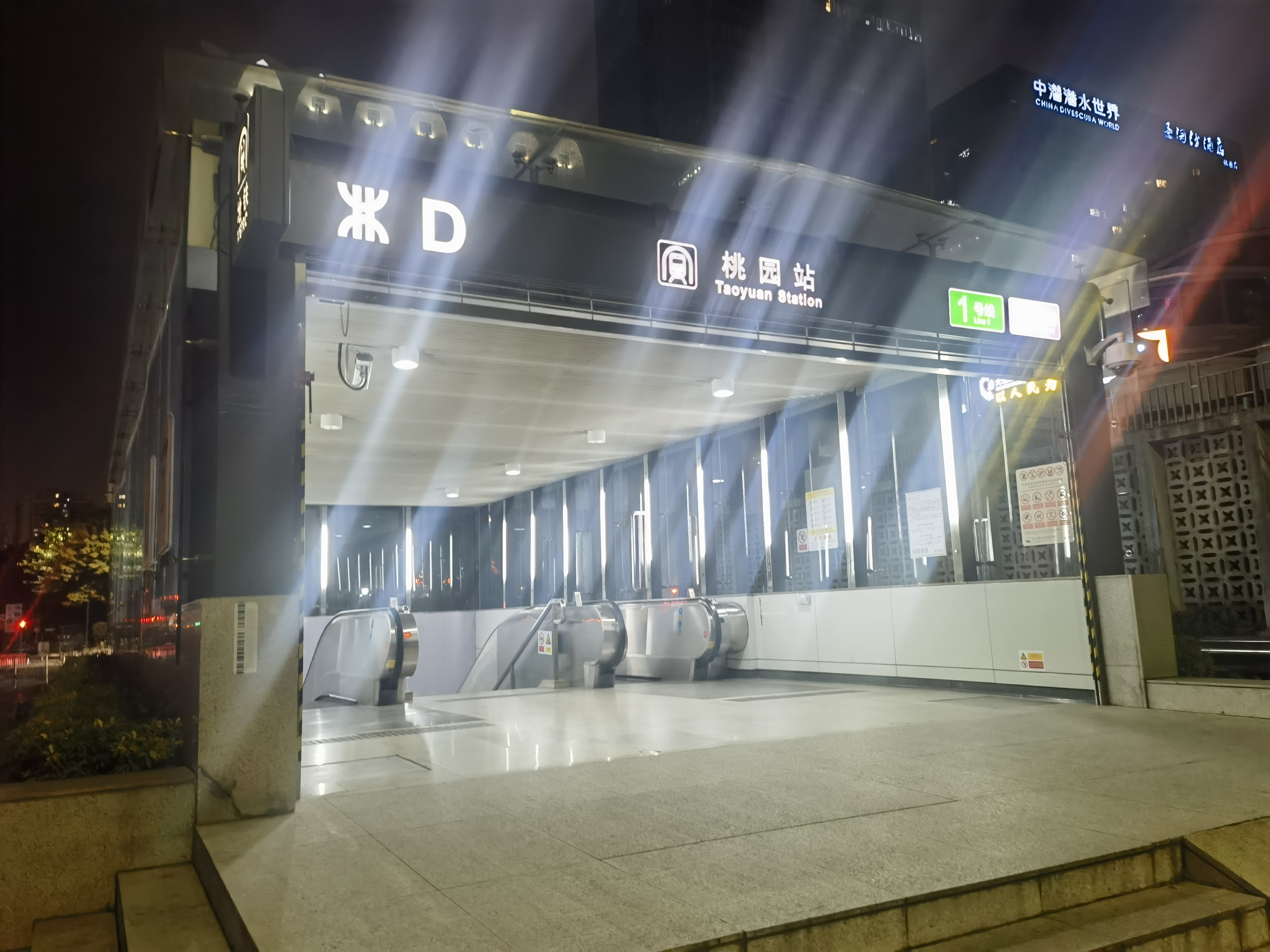
Entrance D

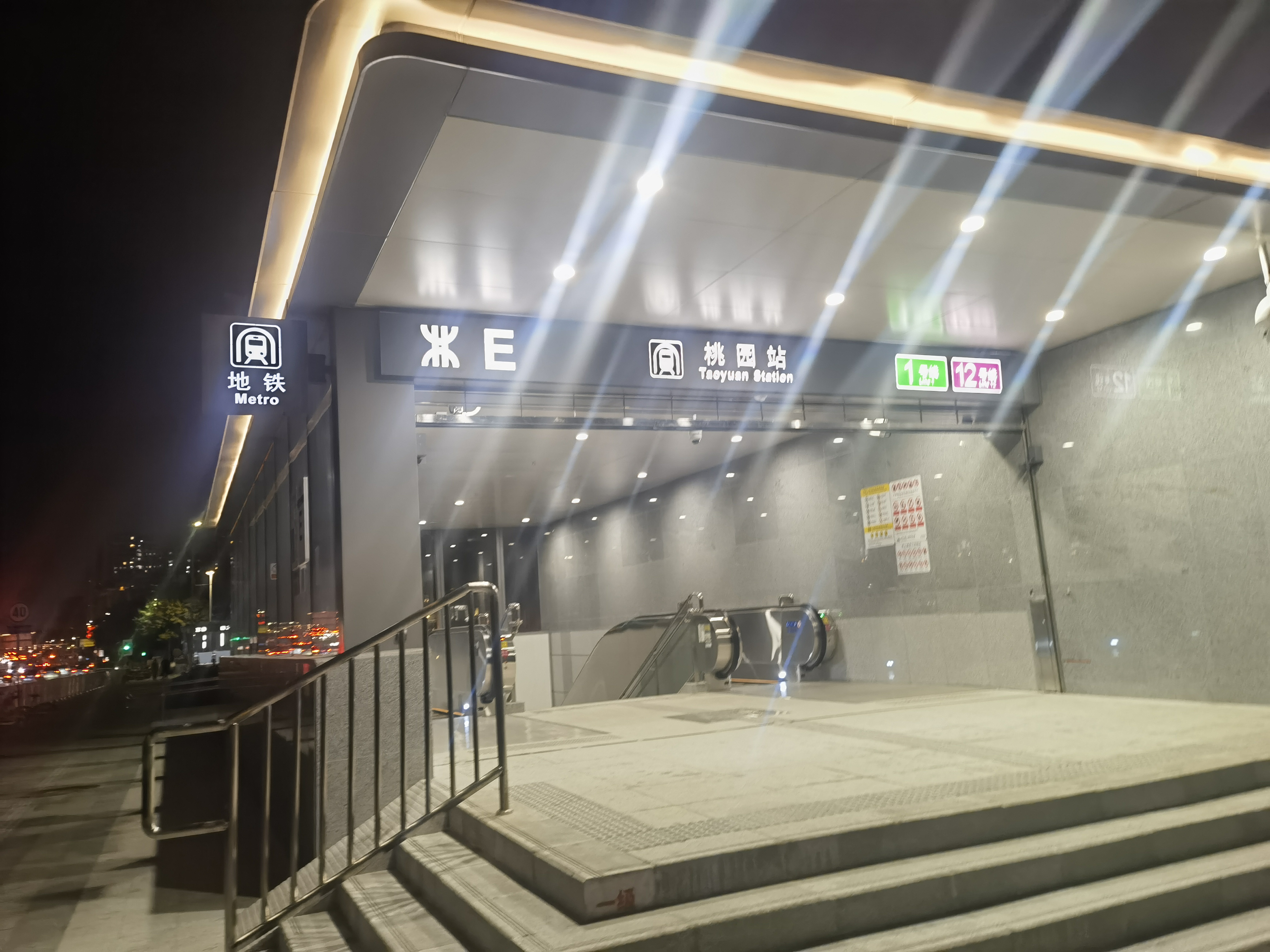
Entrance E
