= Tongle South station =

Shenzhen Metro Line 12 station

Tongle South 同乐南
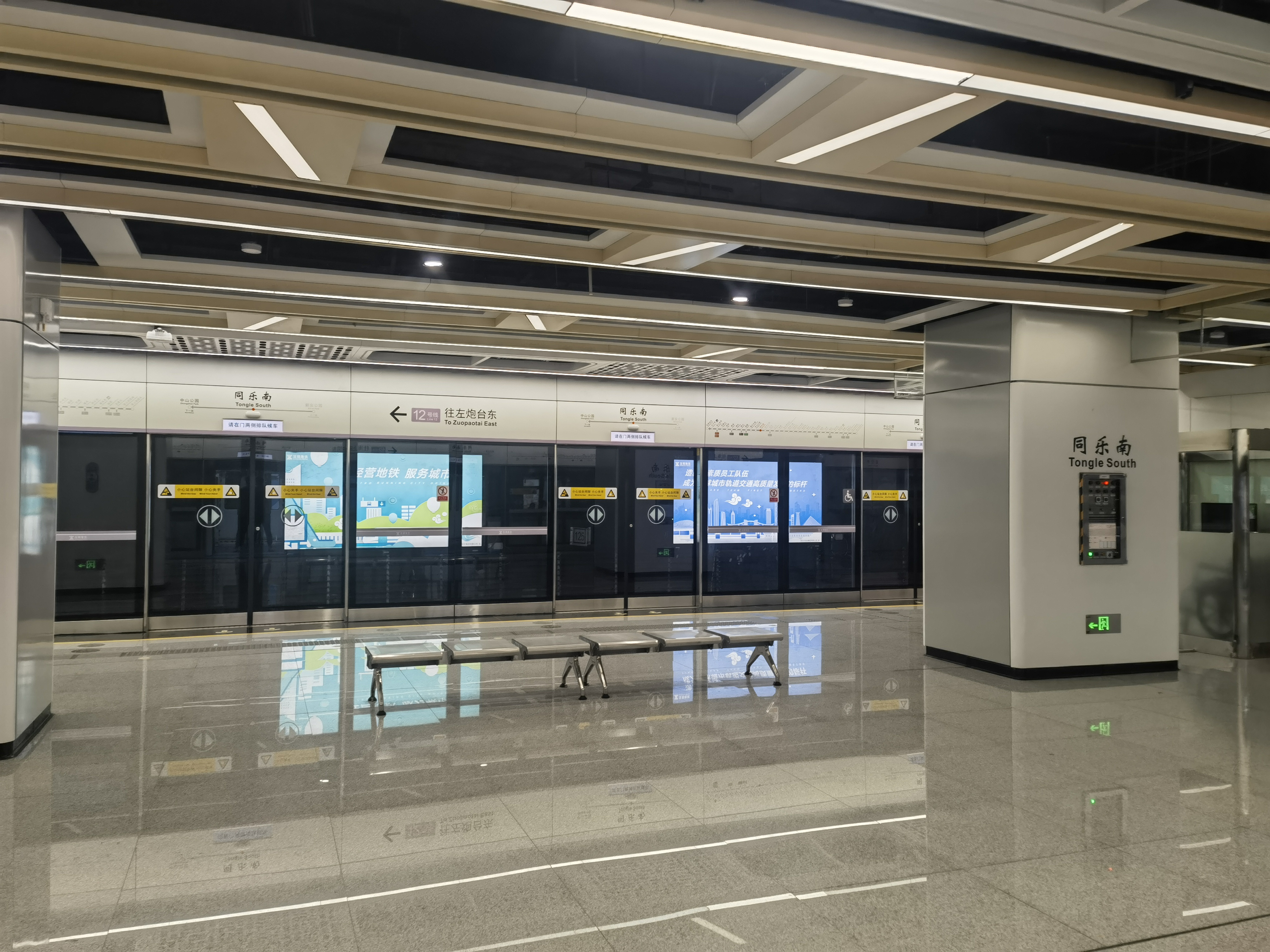
- Platform

Chinese name
- Traditional Chinese: 同樂南
- Simplified Chinese: 同乐南
Transcriptions
Standard Mandarin
- Hanyu Pinyin: Tónglè Nán
Yue: Cantonese
- Yale Romanization: Tùhnglohk Nàahm
- Jyutping: Tung6 Lok6 Naam4

General information
- Location: Qianjin Road; Nanshan District, Shenzhen, Guangdong; China
- Coordinates: 22°33′33.12″N 113°54′50.08″E
- Operated by: Shenzhen Line 12 Rail Transit Co., Ltd (Shenzhen Metro Group and PowerChina PPP)
- Line: Line 12
- Platforms: 2 (1 island platform)
- Tracks: 2

Construction
- Structure type: Underground
- Accessible: Yes

History
- Opened: 28 November 2022 (3 years ago)

Services
Preceding station	Shenzhen Metro	Following station
Xin'an Park towards Songgang	Line 12	Zhongshan Park towards Zuopaotai East
Location

Tongle South station (simplified Chinese: 同乐南; traditional Chinese: 同樂南; pinyin: Tónglè Nán; Cantonese Yale: Tùhnglohk Nàahm) is a metro station on Line 12 of Shenzhen Metro. It opened on 28 November 2022.

== Station layout ==
The station has an island platform under Qianjin Road.

G	–	Exits A-D
B1F; Concourse	Lobby	Ticket Machines, Customer Service, Station Control Room
B2F; Platforms	Platform	12 towards Songgang (Xin'an Park)
B2F; Platforms	Island platform, doors will open on the left
B2F; Platforms	Platform	12 towards Zuopaotai East (Zhongshan Park)

=== Entrances/exits ===
The station has 4 points of entry/exit. When the station opened, Exits A, B and D were opened.

Exit	Destination
Exit A	Tong'an Road
Exit B	Qianjin 1st Road, Hongrongyuan Shangjing Mansion
Exit C	Under construction
Exit D	Qianjin 1st Road, Nannong Road, Nanshan Avenue, Haofang Skyline, Nanshan Agricultural Batch

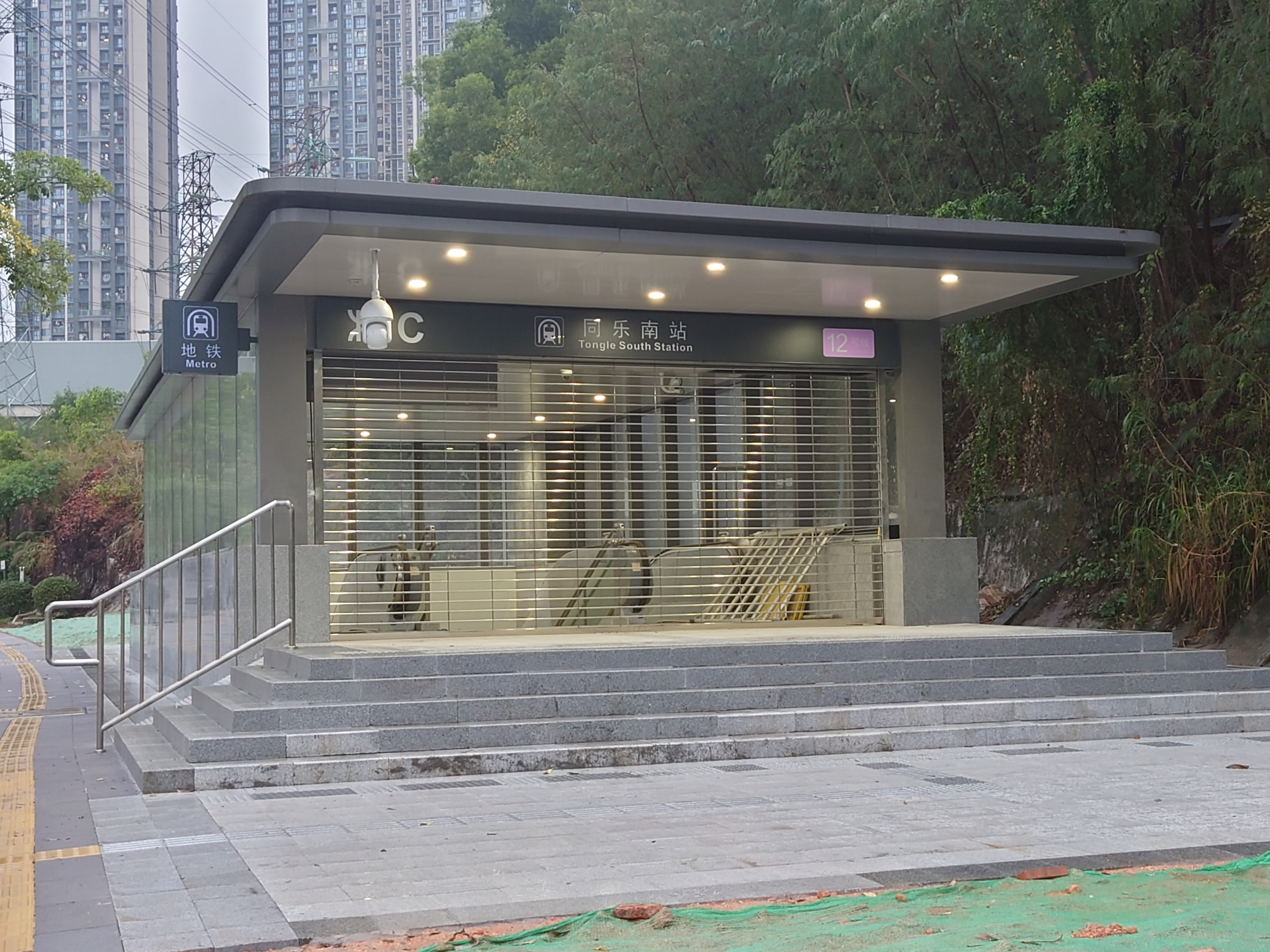
Entrance C (not open)

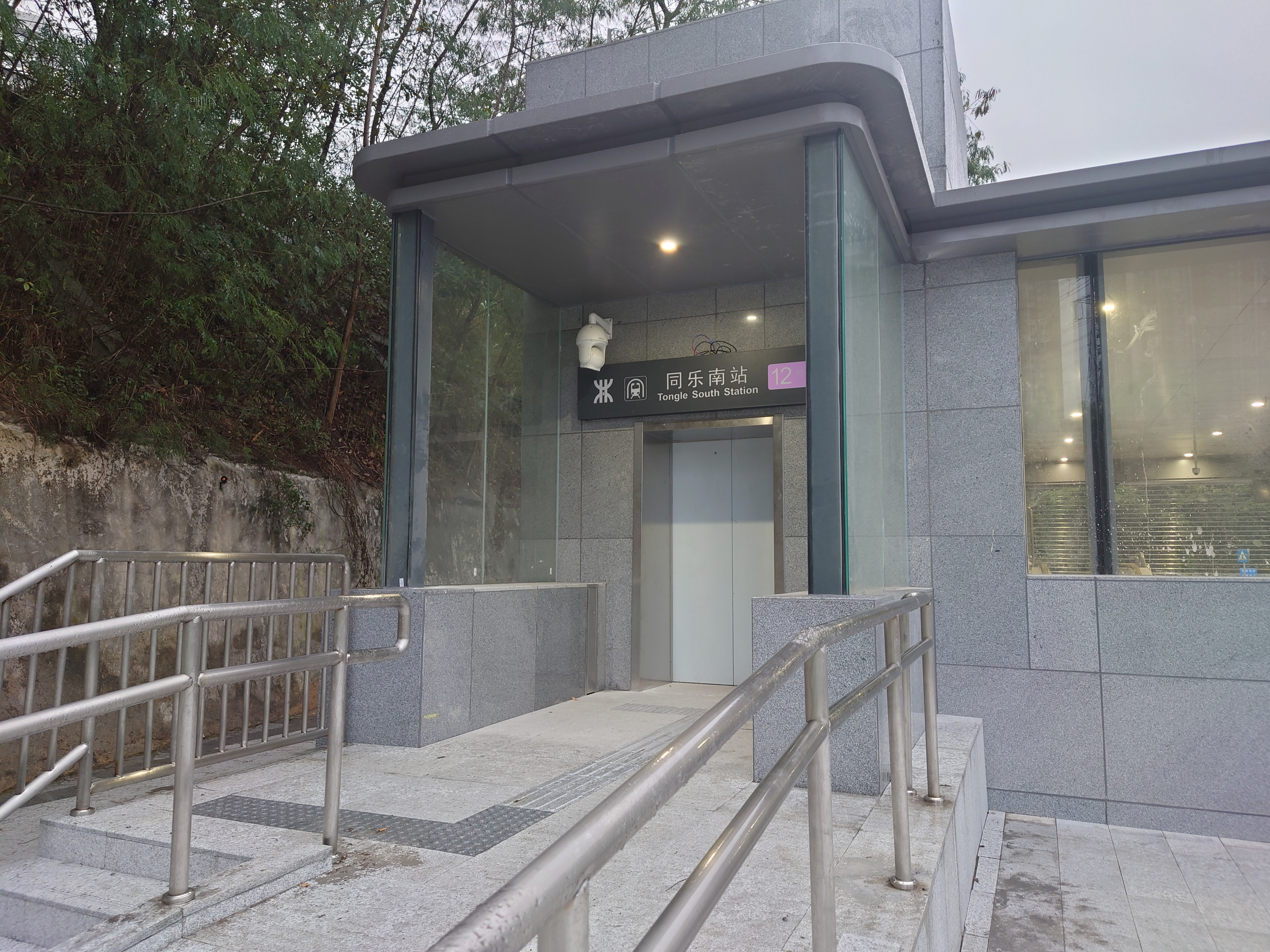
Entrance C (elevator entrance, not open)

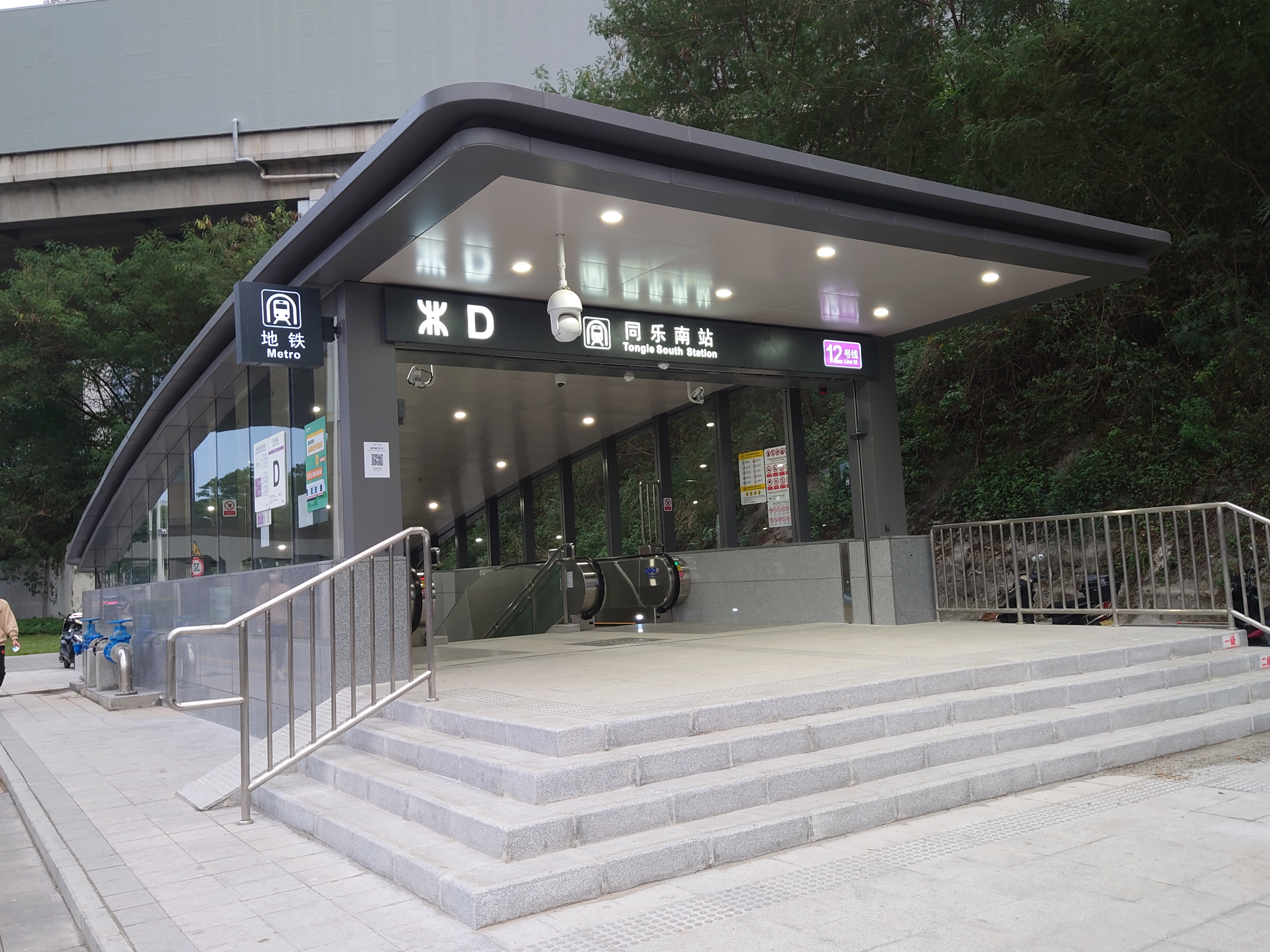
Entrance D

== Gallery ==
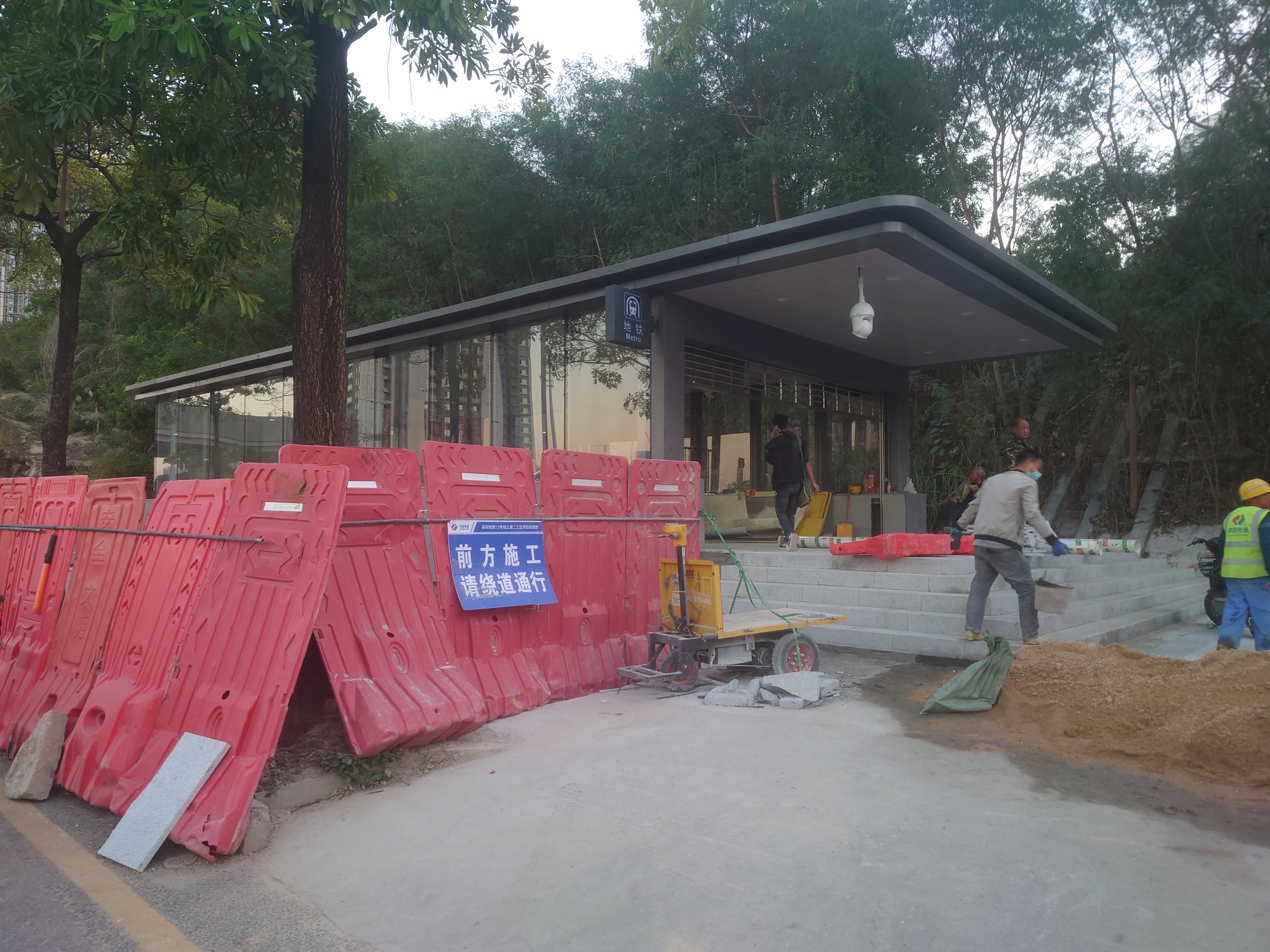
Exit C under construction after station opening (21 December 2022)

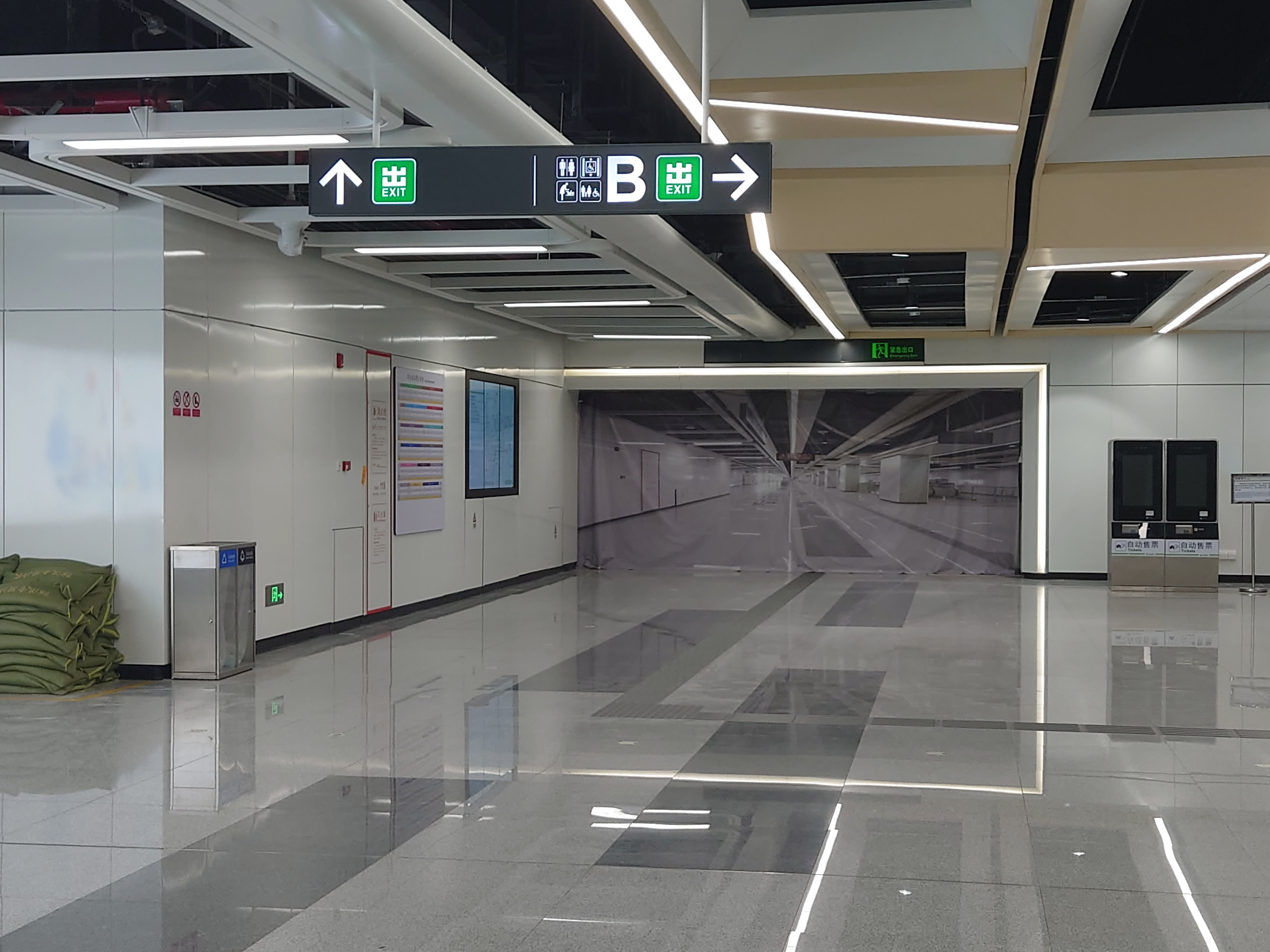
Unopened exit C passageway (13 January 2023)
