= Xin'an Park station =

Shenzhen Metro Line 12 station

Xin'an Park 新安公园
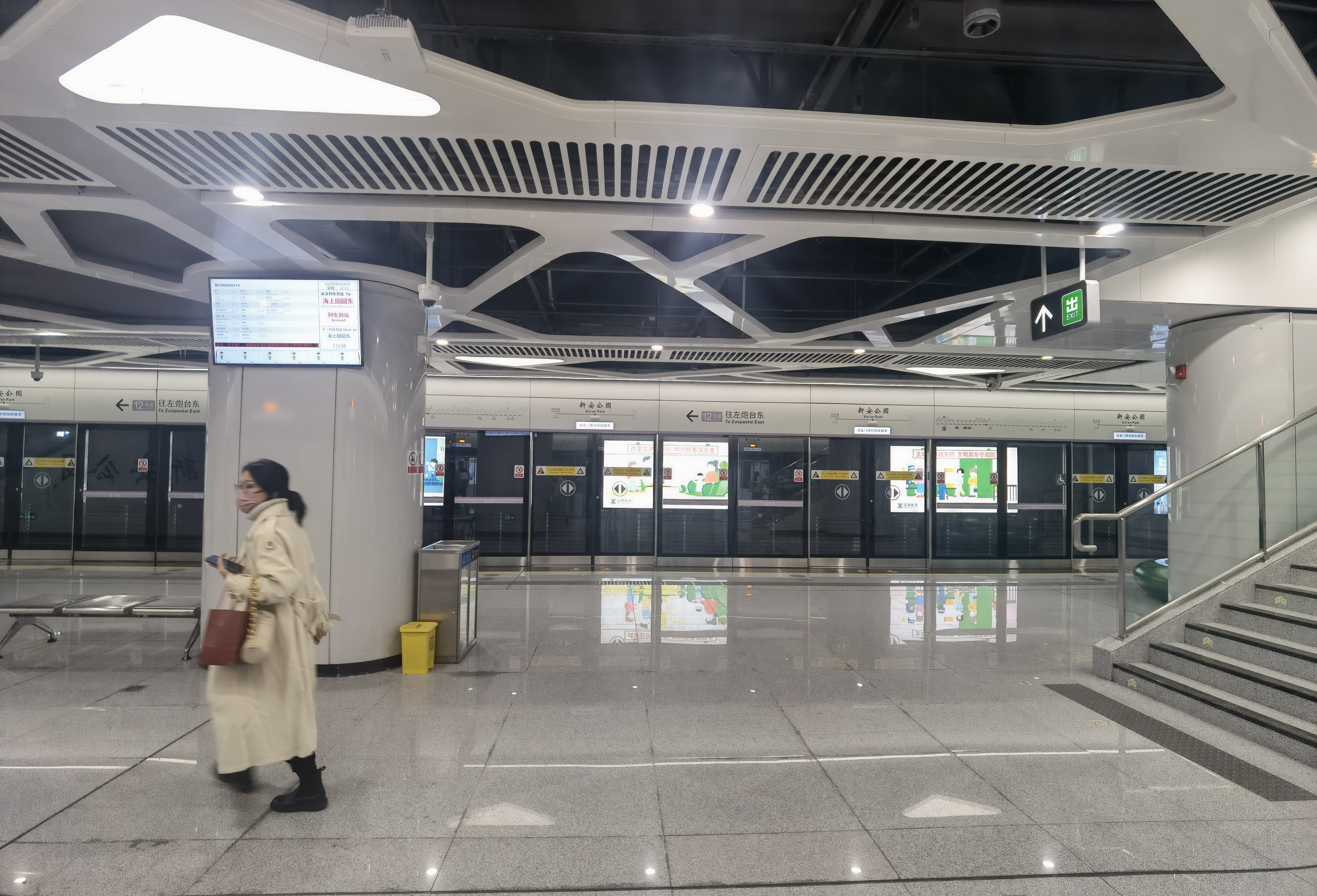
- Platform

Chinese name
- Traditional Chinese: 新安公園
- Simplified Chinese: 新安公园
Transcriptions
Standard Mandarin
- Hanyu Pinyin: Xīnān Gōngyuán
Yue: Cantonese
- Yale Romanization: Sān'ōn Gūng'yún
- Jyutping: San1 On1 Gung1 Jyun4

General information
- Location: North of the intersection of Qianjin 1st Road and Xin'an 2nd Road; Xin'an Subdistrict, Bao'an District, Shenzhen, Guangdong; China
- Coordinates: 22°33′54.97″N 113°54′21.49″E
- Operated by: Shenzhen Line 12 Rail Transit Co., Ltd (Shenzhen Metro Group and PowerChina PPP)
- Line: Line 12
- Platforms: 2 (1 island platform)
- Tracks: 2

Construction
- Structure type: Underground
- Accessible: Yes

History
- Opened: 28 November 2022 (3 years ago)

Services
| Preceding station | Shenzhen Metro | Following station |
|---|---|---|
| Lingzhi towards Songgang | Line 12 | Tongle South towards Zuopaotai East |
Location

Xin'an Park station (simplified Chinese: 新安公园; traditional Chinese: 新安公園; pinyin: Xīnān Gōngyuán; Cantonese Yale: Sān'ōn Gūng'yún) is a metro station on Line 12 of Shenzhen Metro. It opened on 28 November 2022.

== Station layout ==
The station has an island platform under Qianjin 1st Road.

| G | – | Exits A-D |
| B1F; Concourse | Lobby | Ticket Machines, Customer Service, Station Control Room |
| B2F; Platforms | Platform | 12 towards Songgang (Lingzhi) |
| B2F; Platforms | Island platform, doors will open on the left |
| B2F; Platforms | Platform | 12 towards Zuopaotai East (Tongle South) |

=== Entrances/exits ===
The station has 5 points of entry/exit, with Exits B and D being accessible via elevators. Exit B has toilets.

| Exit | | Destination |
|---|---|---|
| Exit A | | Qianjin 1st Road (E), Xin'an 2nd Road (N), Xin'an Park, Bao'an Middle School (Group) Foreign Chinese Language School, Bao'an District People's Hospital, Yi'an Garden |
| Exit B | | Qianjin 1st Road (E), Xin'an 2nd Road (S), Xin'an Park, Lingzhiyuan New Estate, Baomin Primary School, Honglang Second Estate |
| Exit C | C1 | Qianjin 1st Road (W), Xin'an 2nd Road (S), Xin'an Lake Garden, Jingfa Building, Xiangbin Plaza |
| Exit C | C2 | Qianjin 1st Road (W), Xin'an 2nd Road (S), Xin'an Lake Garden, Jingfa Building, Xiangbin Plaza |
| Exit D | | Qianjin 1st Road (S), Xin'an 2nd Road (W), Yujing Terrace, Bao'an 1990, Bao'an Science and Technology Museum |

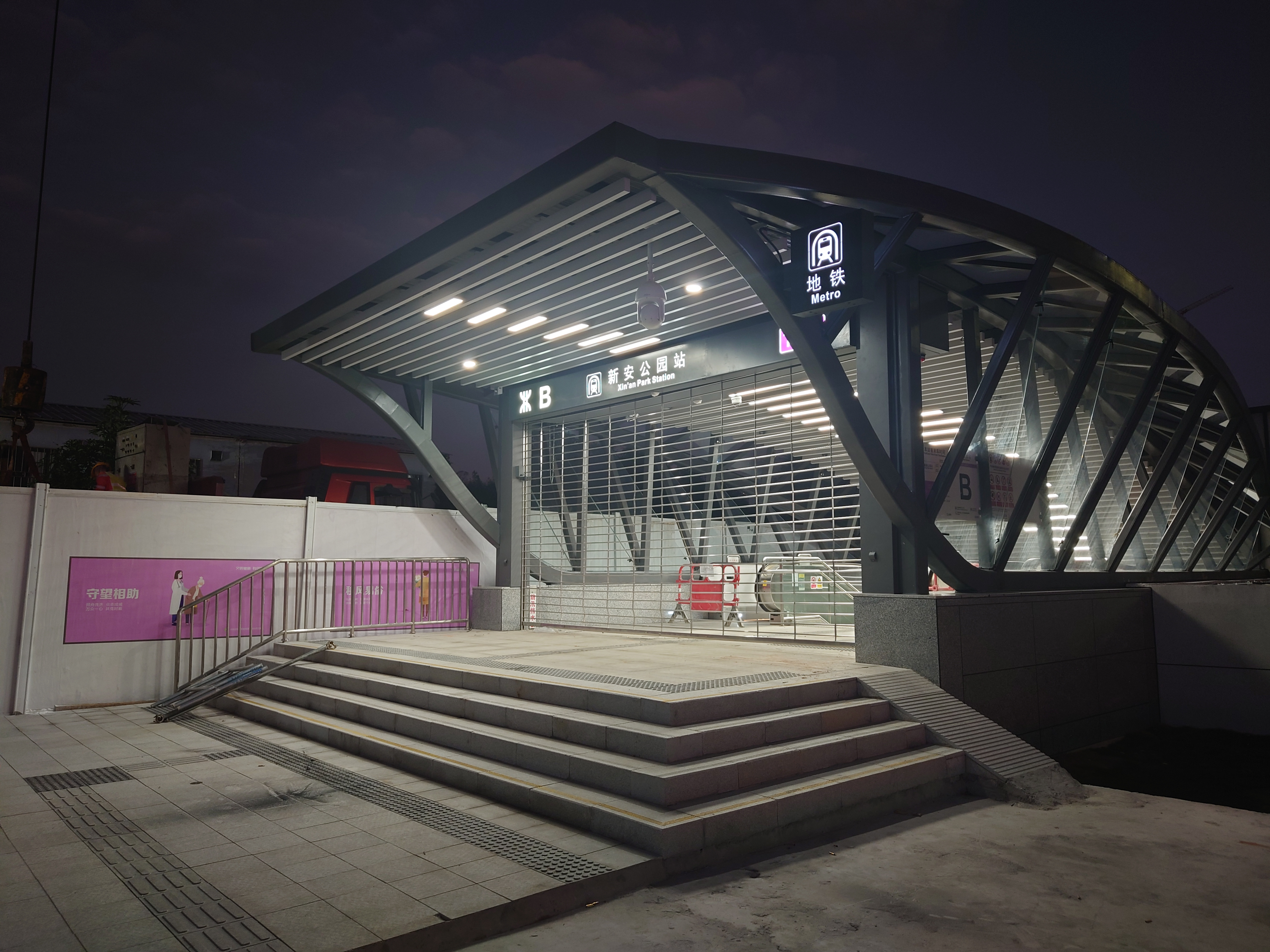
Entrance B

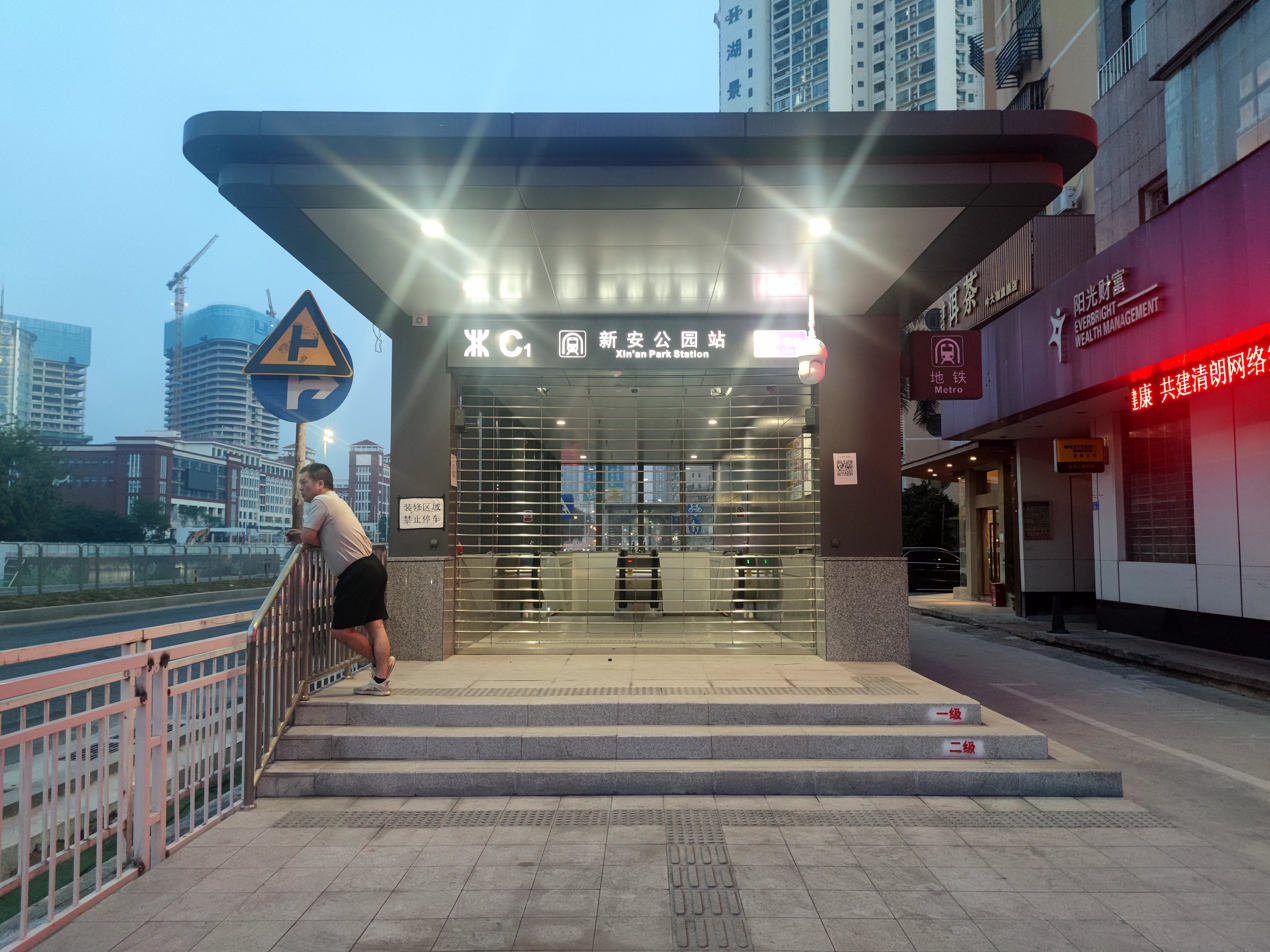
Entrance C1

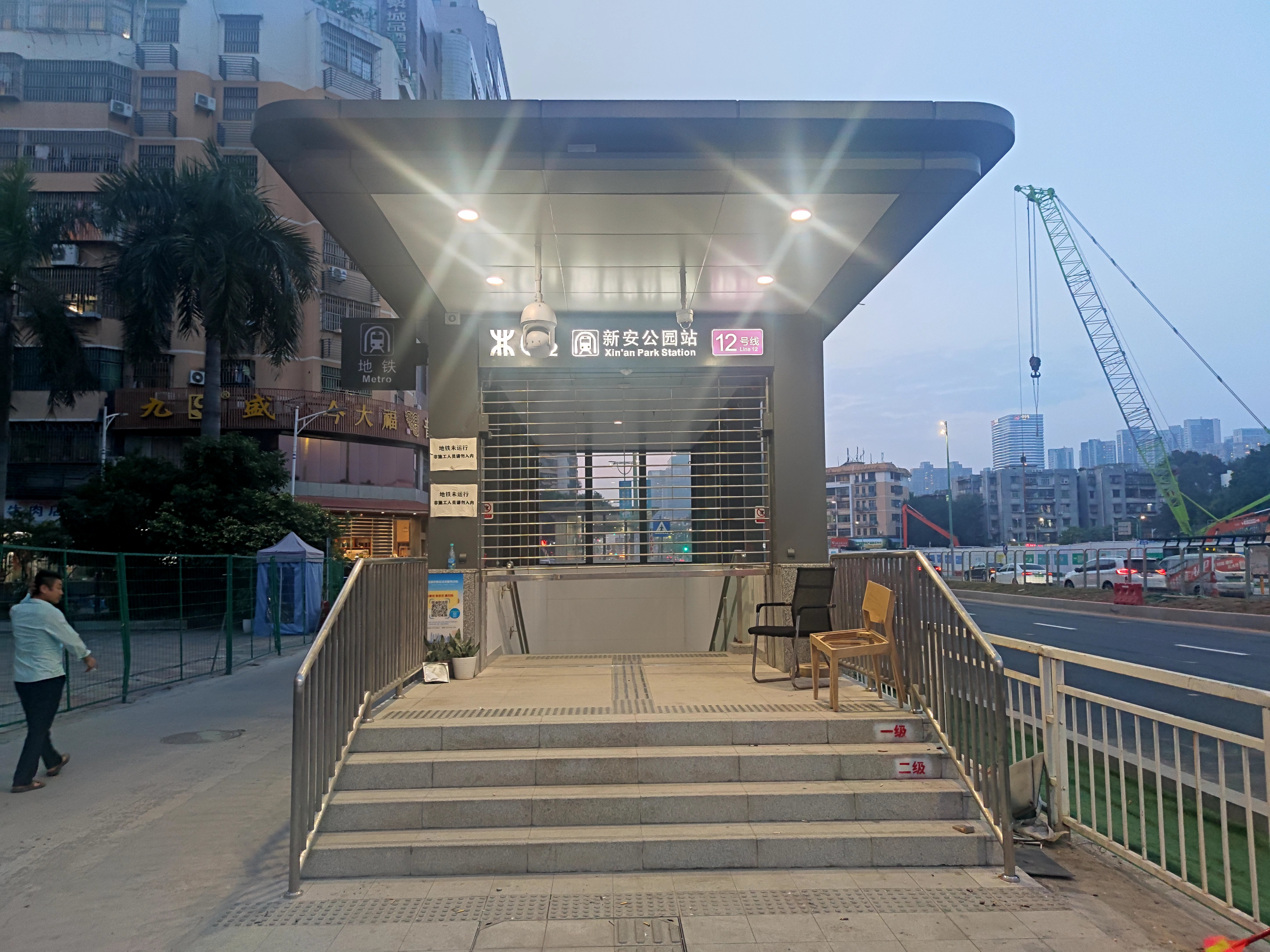
Entrance C2

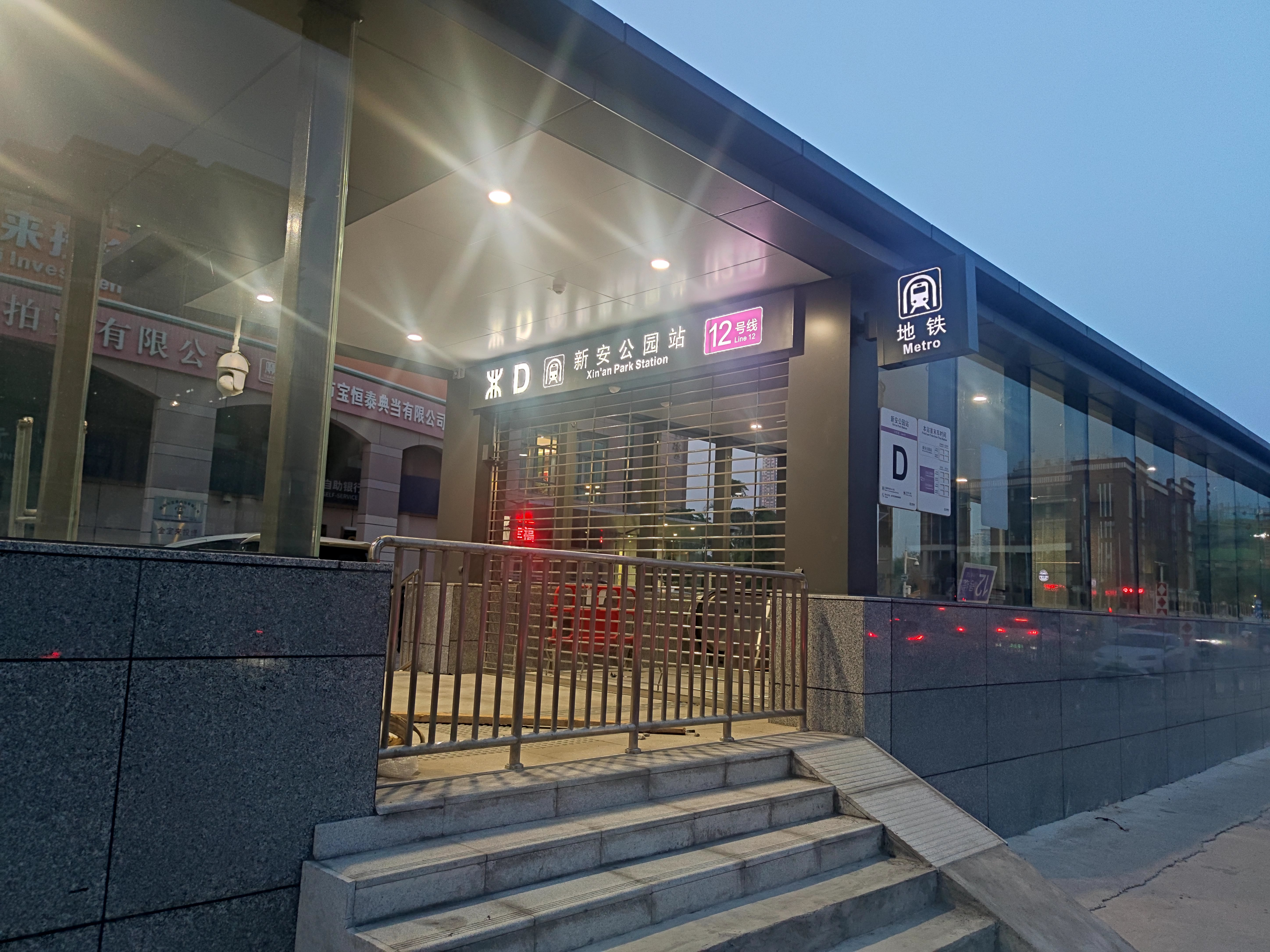
Entrance D

== Gallery ==
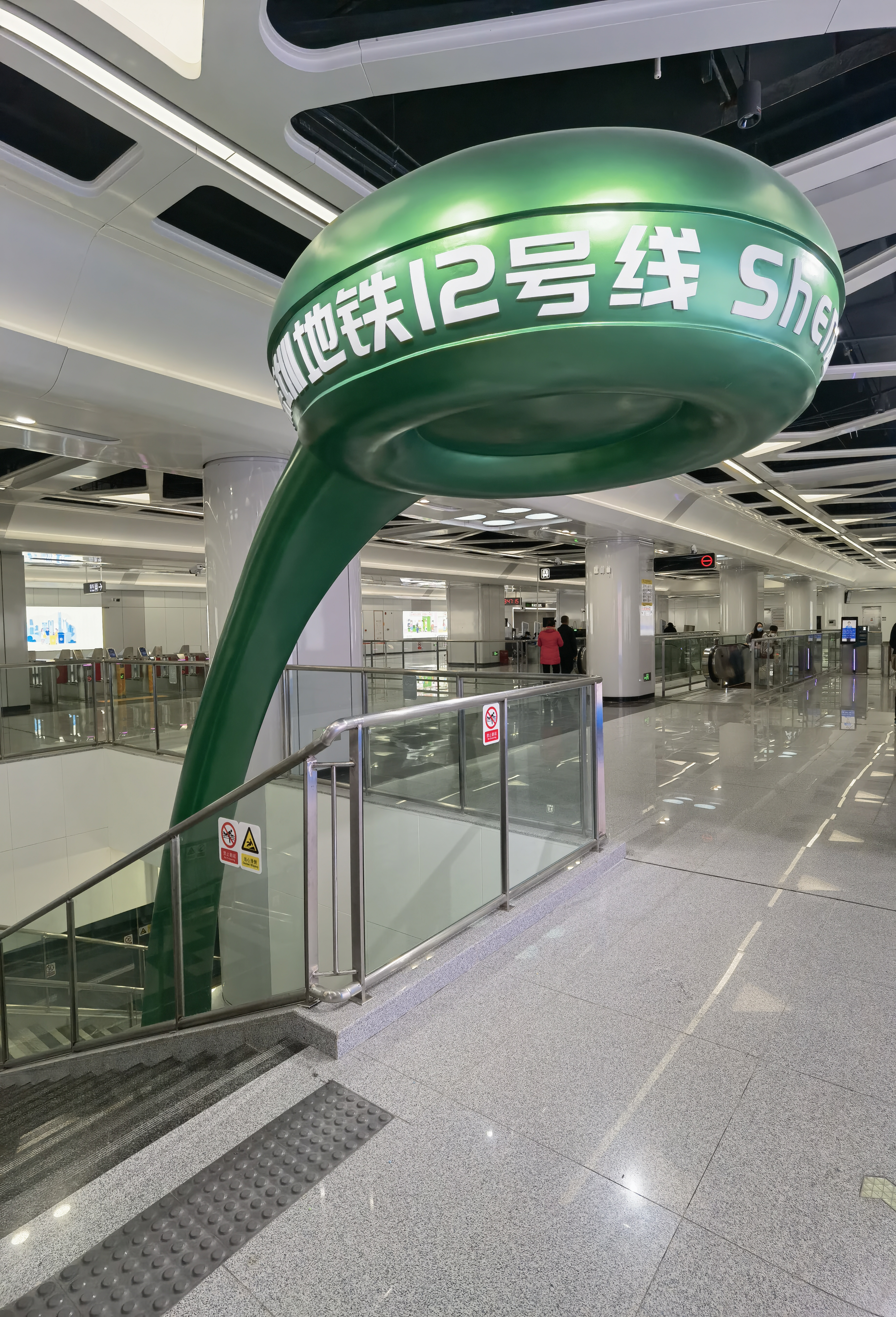
Station art 1

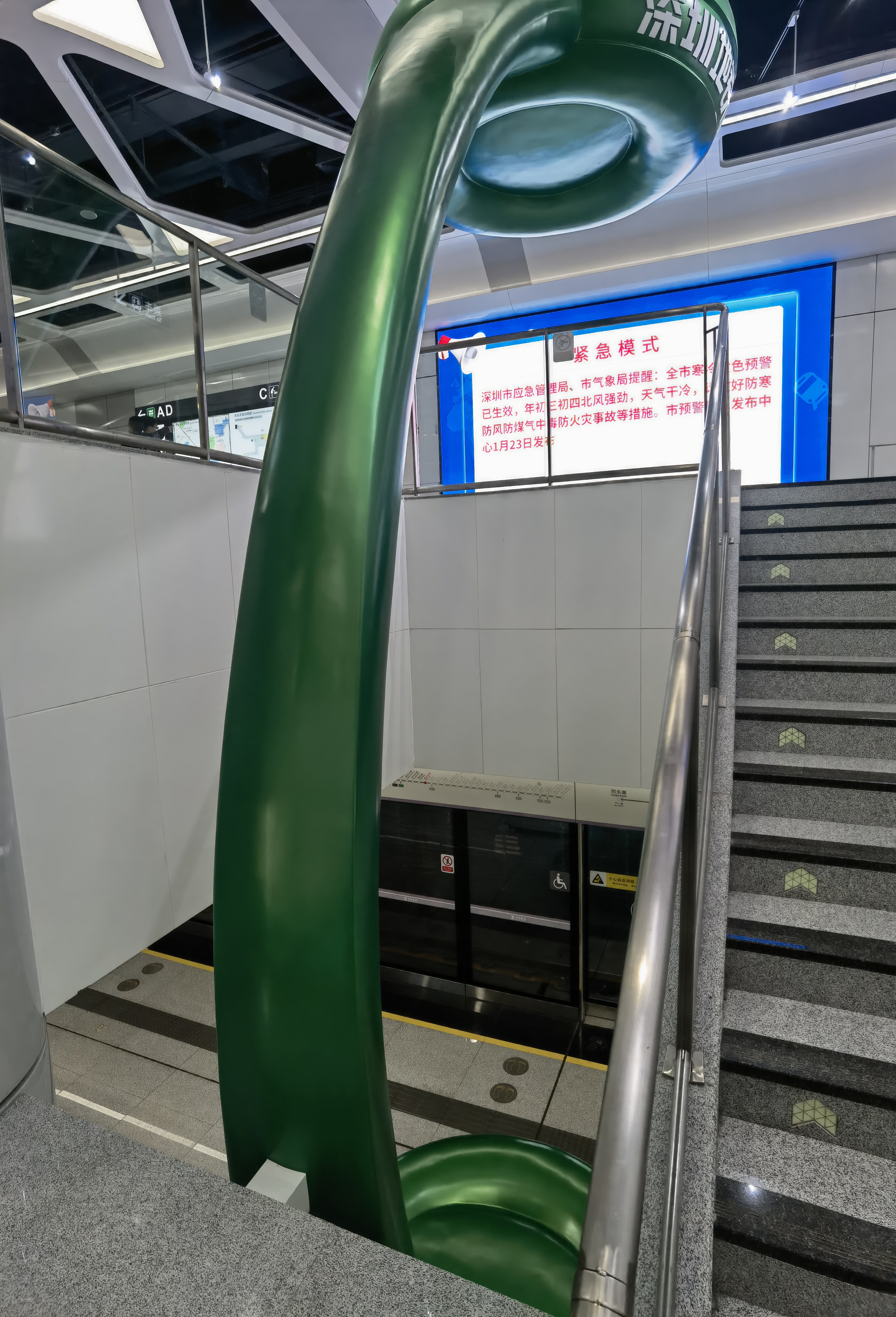
Station art 2

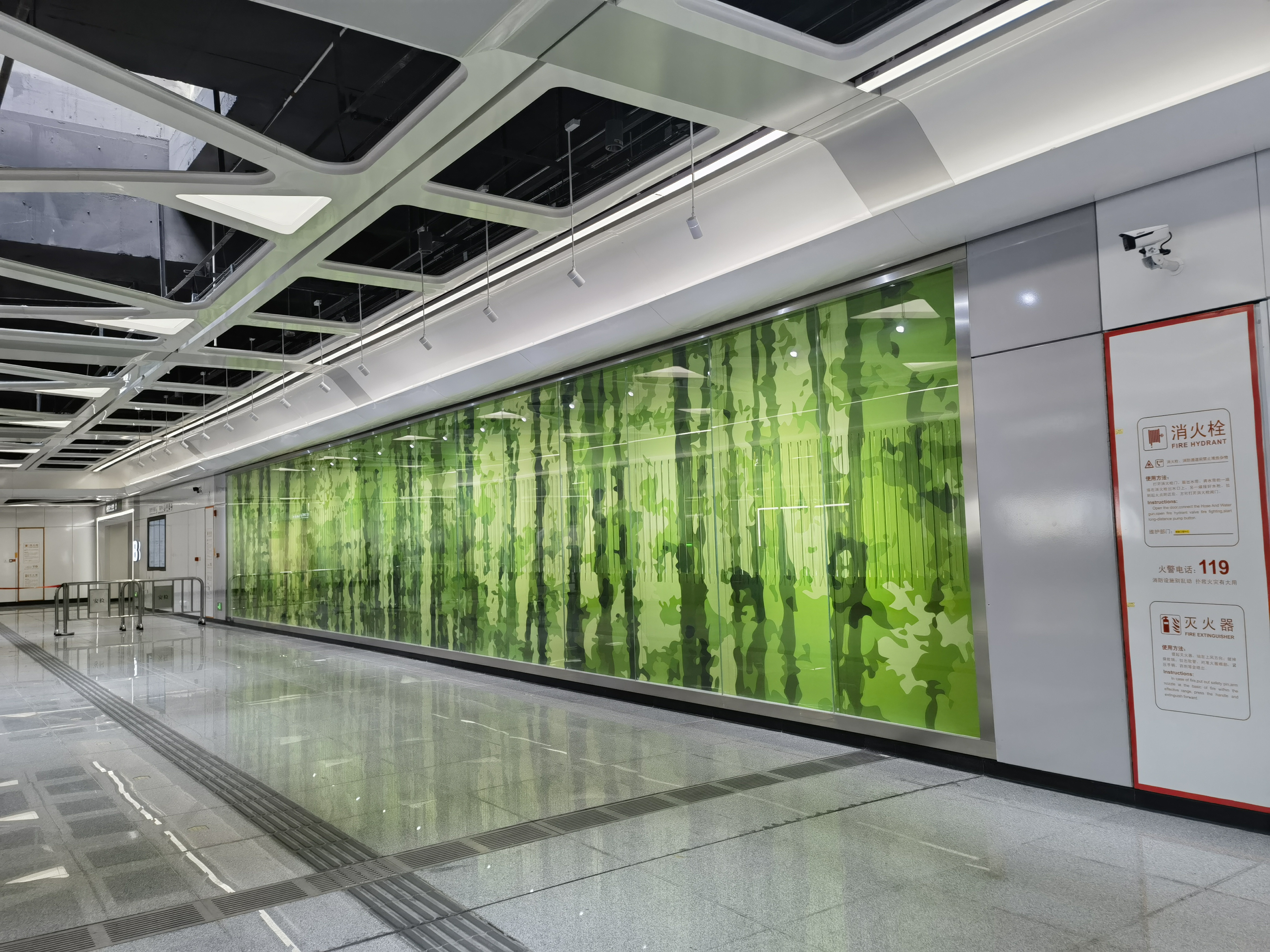
Station wall art
