= Nanshan Boulevard =

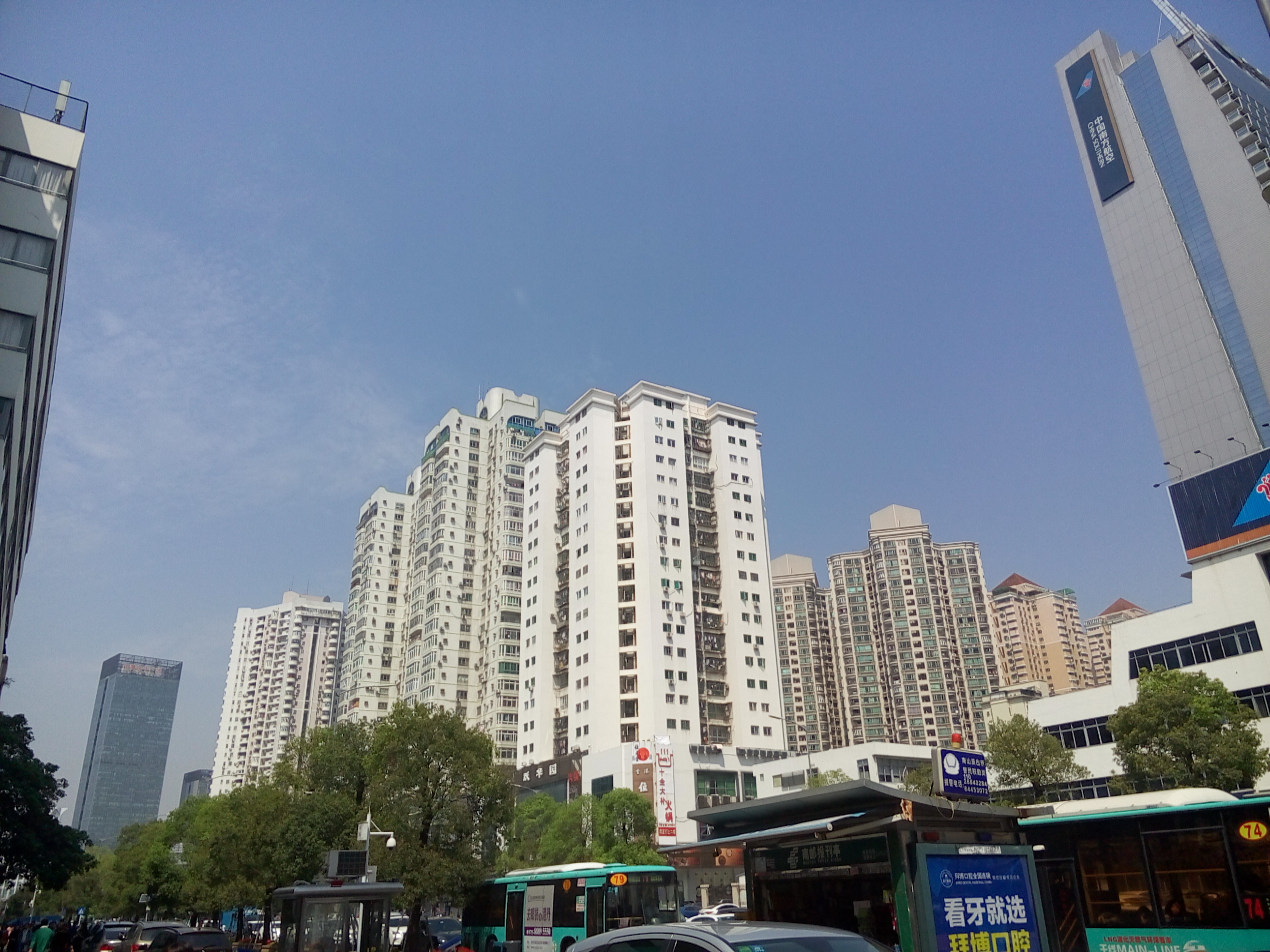
Nanshan Boulevard

Nanshan Boulevard (Chinese: 南山大道) is a major thoroughfare in Nanshan, Shenzhen, China. It runs from Zhongshanyuan Road in the north to Dongbin Road in the south. The road is 5.4 kilometers long.

== Major intersections ==
- Beihuan Boulevard
- Shennan Road
- Binhai Boulevard and Guimiao Road (Intersection)
- Dongbin Road
