= Shajing West railway station =

Railway station in Shenzhen, China

Shajingxi 沙井西
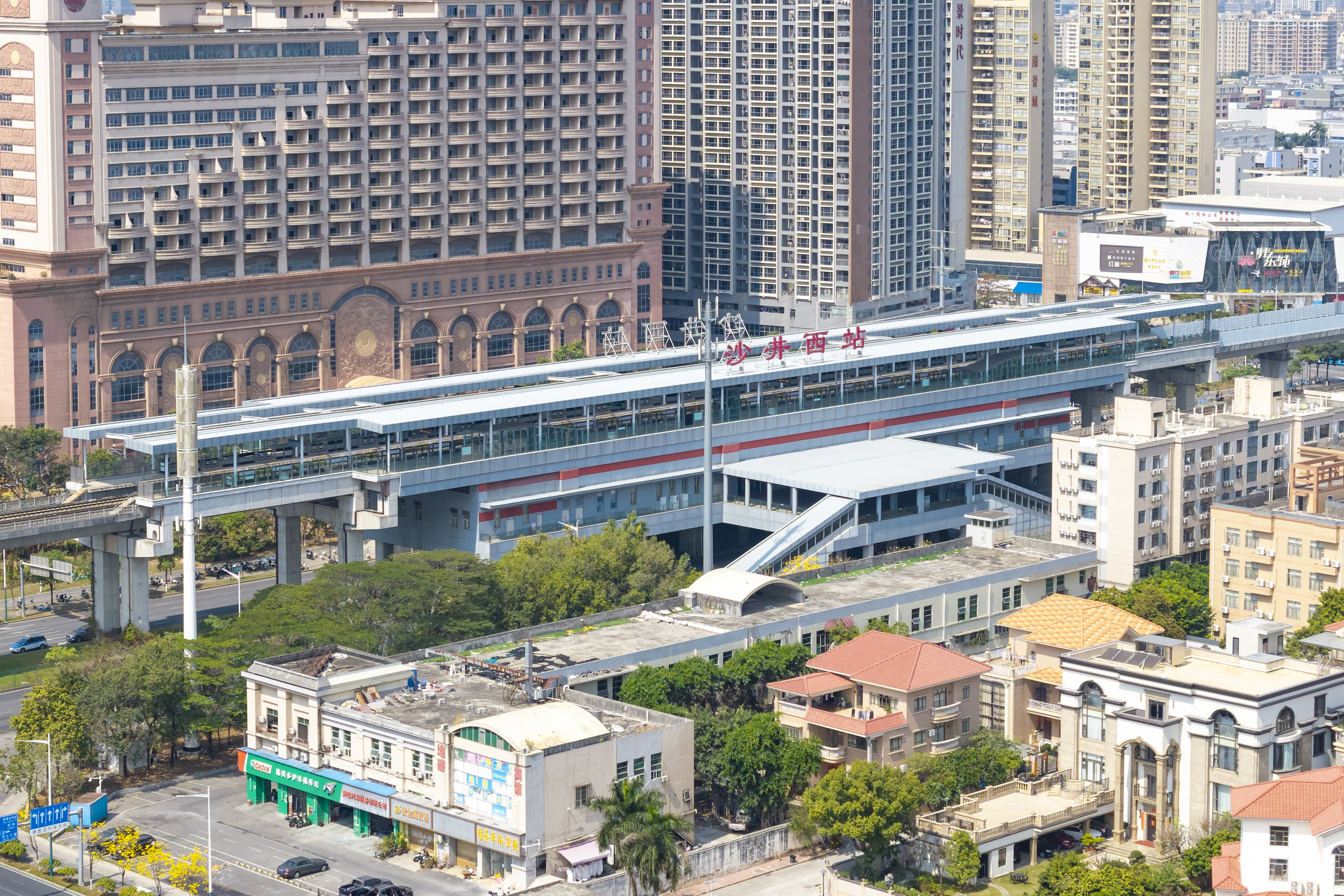
- Exterior

Chinese name
- Chinese: 沙井西站
Transcriptions
Standard Mandarin
- Hanyu Pinyin: Shājǐng Xī Zhàn
Yue: Cantonese
- Yale Romanization: Sājéng Sāi Jaahm
- Jyutping: Saa^{1}zeng^{2}sai^{1} Zaam^{6}

General information
- Location: Songfu Boulevard (松福大道), Shajing Subdistrict, Bao'an District, Shenzhen, Guangdong; China
- Coordinates: 22°44′11″N 113°47′18″E
- Owner: Pearl River Delta Metropolitan Region intercity railway
- Operator: Guangdong Intercity
- Line: Guangzhou–Shenzhen intercity railway
- Platforms: 2 (2 side platforms)
- Tracks: 2

Construction
- Structure type: Elevated
- Accessible: Yes

Other information
- Station code: SJA (Pinyin: SJX)

History
- Opened: 15 December 2019 (6 years ago)

Services
Preceding station	Pearl River Delta Metropolitan Region Intercity Railway	Following station
Chang'an towards Zhuliao	Guangzhou–Shenzhen intercity railway	Fuhai West towards Shenzhen Airport
Location

Shajing West railway station (Chinese: 沙井西站; pinyin: Shājǐng Xī Zhàn; Cantonese Yale: Sājéng Sāi Jaahm) is a railway station in Bao'an District, Shenzhen, Guangdong, China. It opened on 15 December 2019. It has 4 exits, lettered A-D, situated on the east and west sides of Songfu Boulevard.

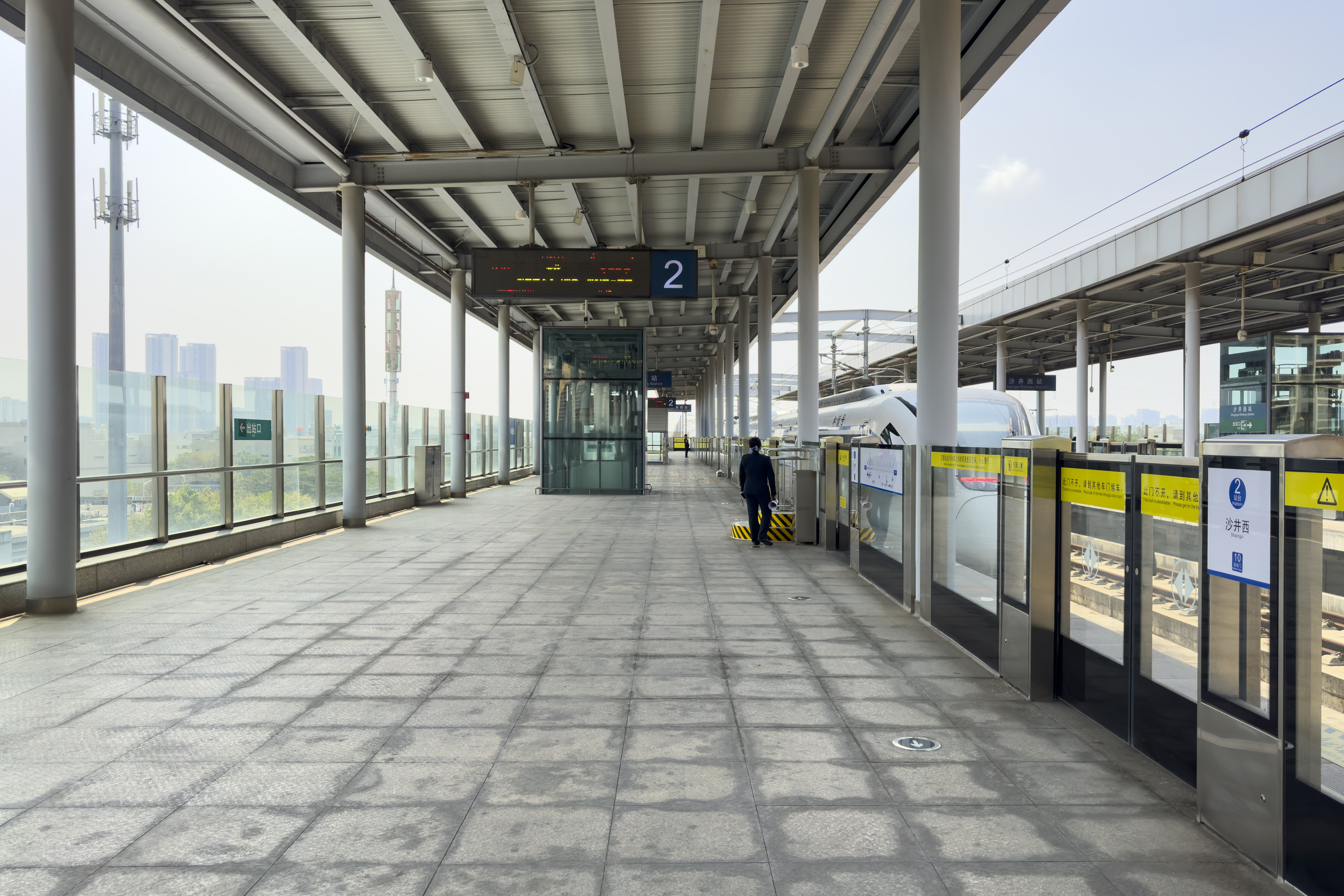
Platform 2

== History ==
The station began construction at the end of 2014 with the rest of the Shenzhen section of the Guangzhou–Shenzhen intercity railway. It opened on 15 December 2019.
