= Fuhai West railway station =

Railway station in Shenzhen, China

Fuhaixi 福海西
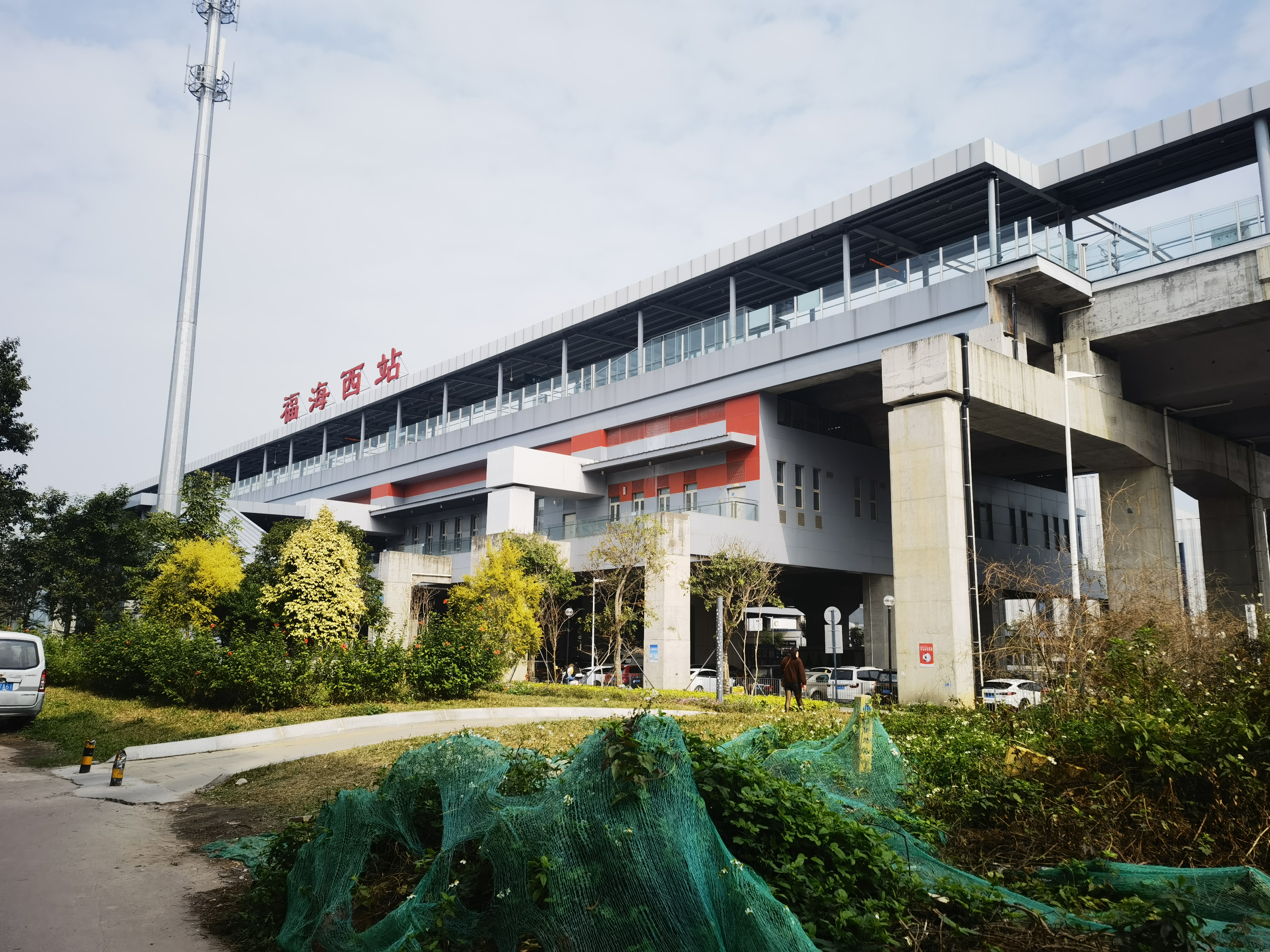
- Exterior in December 2021

Chinese name
- Chinese: 福海西站
Transcriptions
Standard Mandarin
- Hanyu Pinyin: Fúhǎi Xī Zhàn
Yue: Cantonese
- Yale Romanization: Fūkhói Sāi Jaahm
- Jyutping: Fuk^{1}hoi^{2}sai^{1} Zaam^{6}

General information
- Location: Intersection of Qiaohe Road (桥和路) and Songfu Boulevard (松福大道), Fuhai Subdistrict, Bao'an District, Shenzhen, Guangdong; China
- Coordinates: 22°41′33″N 113°47′04″E
- Owner: Pearl River Delta Metropolitan Region intercity railway
- Operator: Guangdong Intercity
- Line: Guangzhou–Shenzhen intercity railway
- Platforms: 2 (2 side platforms)
- Tracks: 4
- Connections: 12 Fuhai West

Construction
- Structure type: Elevated
- Accessible: Yes

Other information
- Station code: FHA (Pinyin: FHX)

History
- Opened: 15 December 2019 (6 years ago)

Services
Preceding station	Pearl River Delta Metropolitan Region Intercity Railway	Following station
Shajing West towards Zhuliao	Guangzhou–Shenzhen intercity railway	Shenzhen Airport North towards Shenzhen Airport
Location

Fuhai West railway station (Chinese: 福海西站; pinyin: Fúhǎi Xī Zhàn; Cantonese Yale: Fūkhói Sāi Jaahm) is a railway station in Bao'an District, Shenzhen, Guangdong, China. It opened on 15 December 2019. It has 4 exits, lettered A-D, situated on the east and west sides of Songfu Boulevard.

== History ==
The station began construction at the end of 2014 with the rest of the Shenzhen section of the Guangzhou–Shenzhen intercity railway. It opened on 15 December 2019.

On 2 February 2023, the Narcotics Control Office of Fuhai Street, Bao'an District, Shenzhen launched a publicity campaign with the theme of "Wonderful Fuhai, Drug-free and Love" on the concourse floor of this station.

== Gallery ==
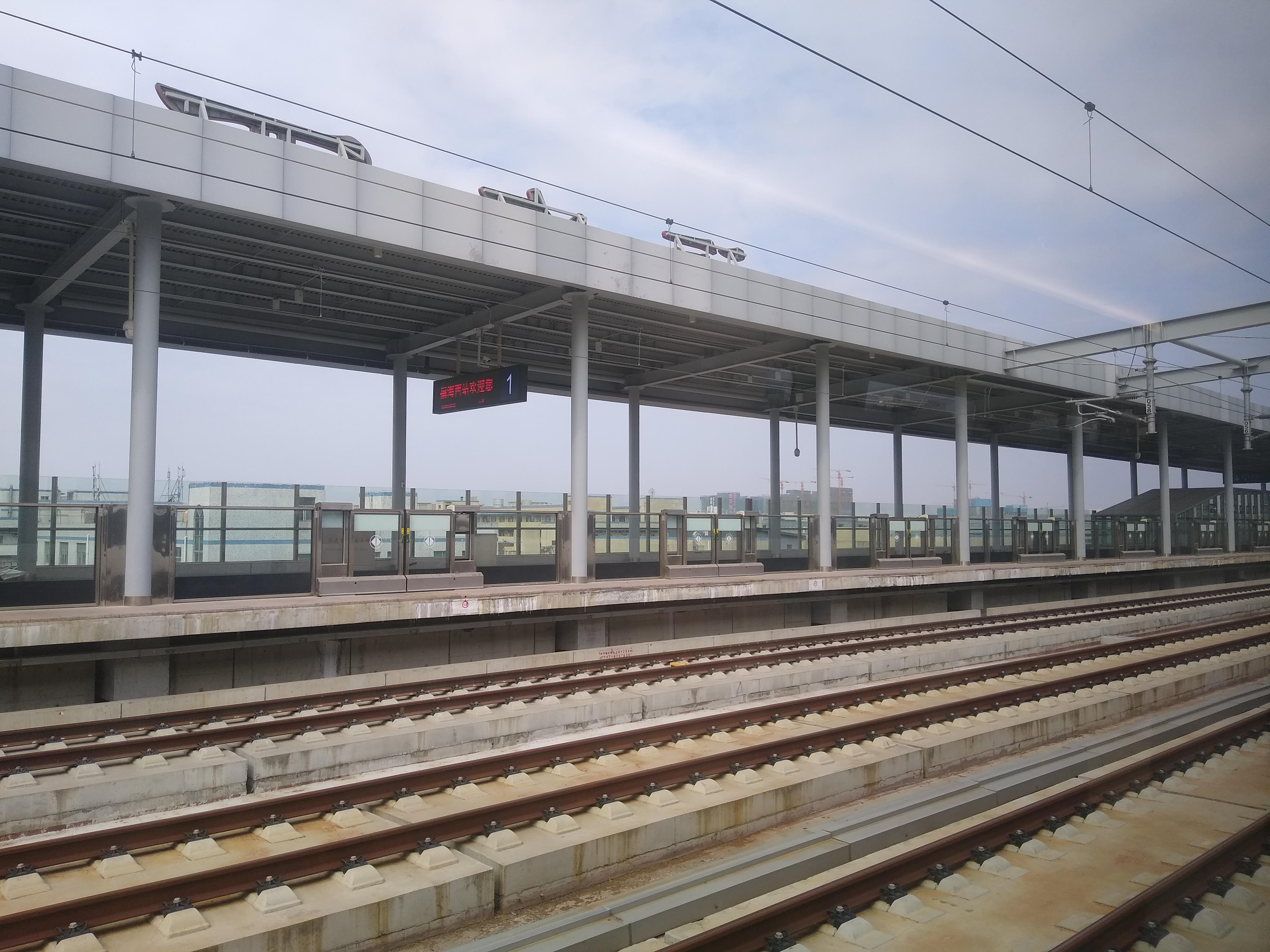
Trackside

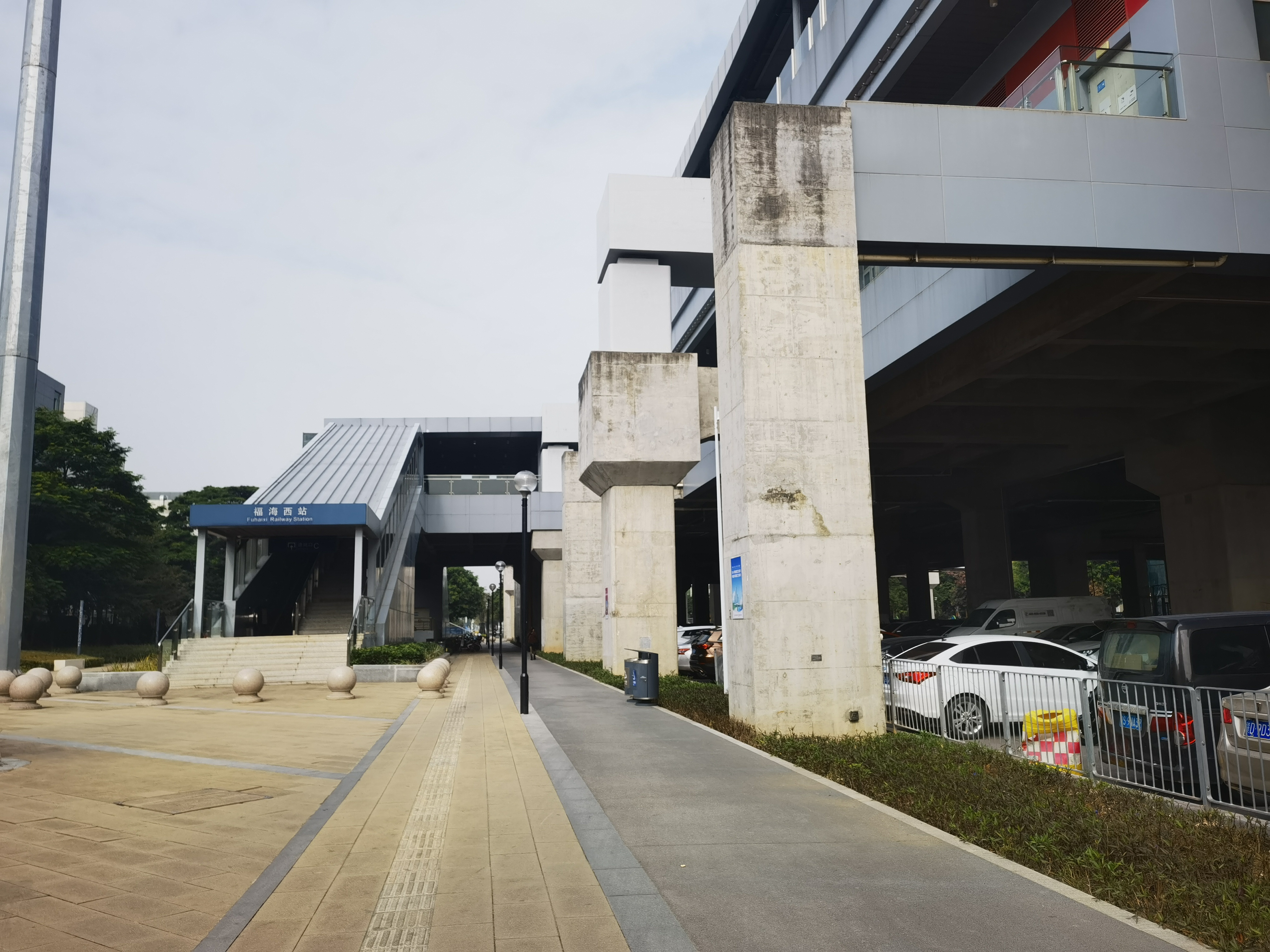
Entrance/exit

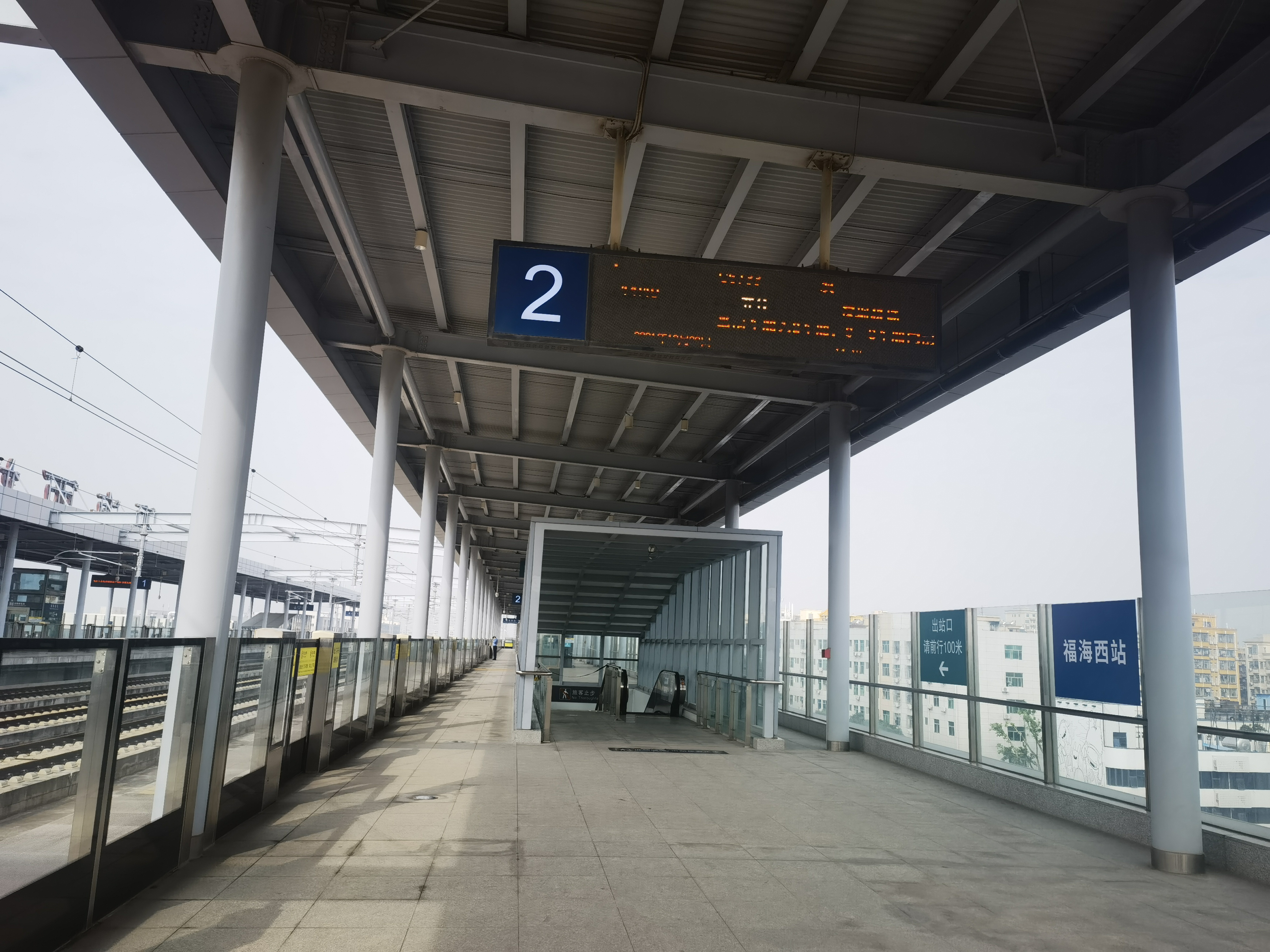
Platform

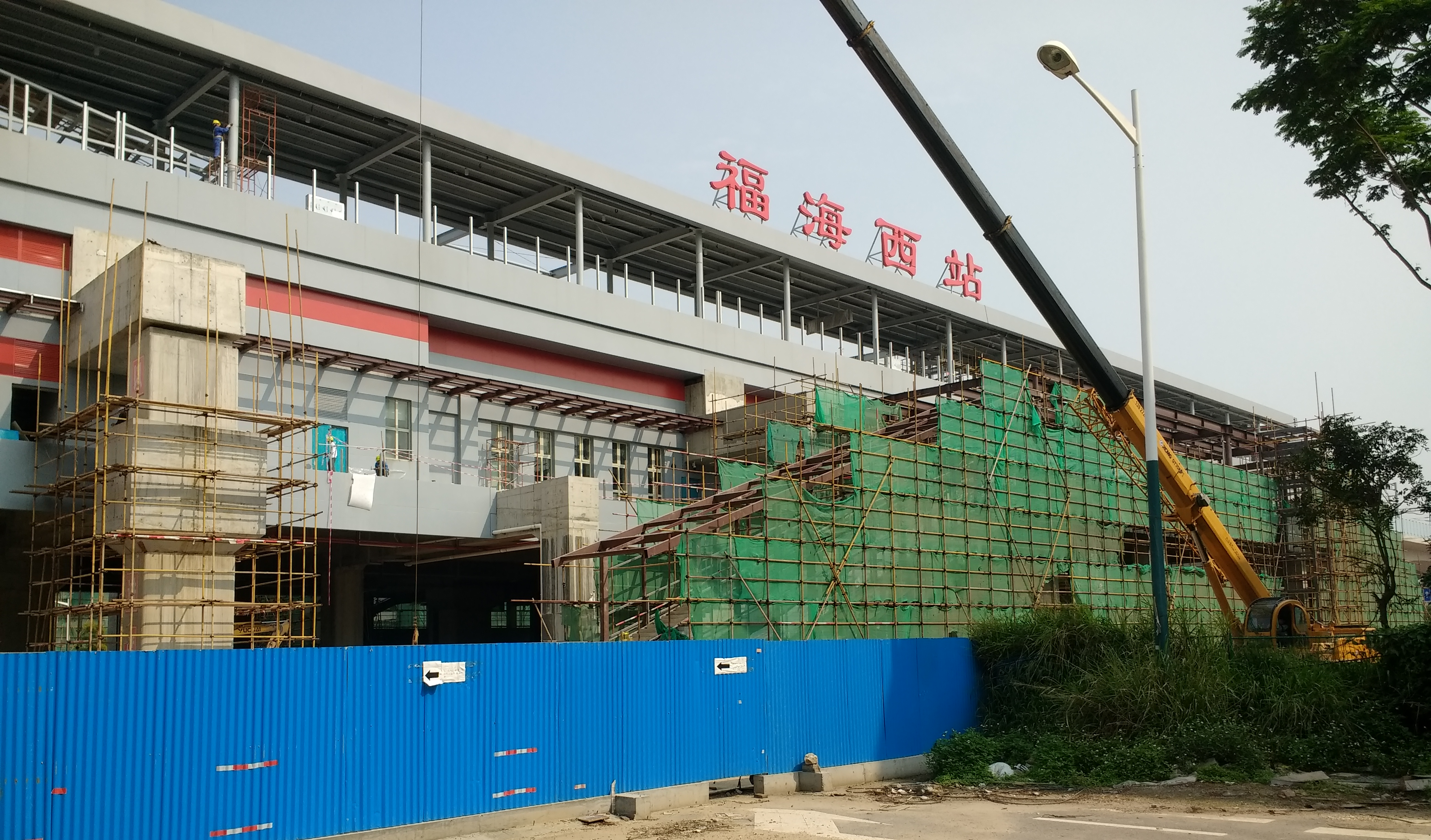
Platform during construction
