= Shenzhen Airport North railway station =

Railway station in Shenzhen, China

Shenzhen Airport North 深圳机场北
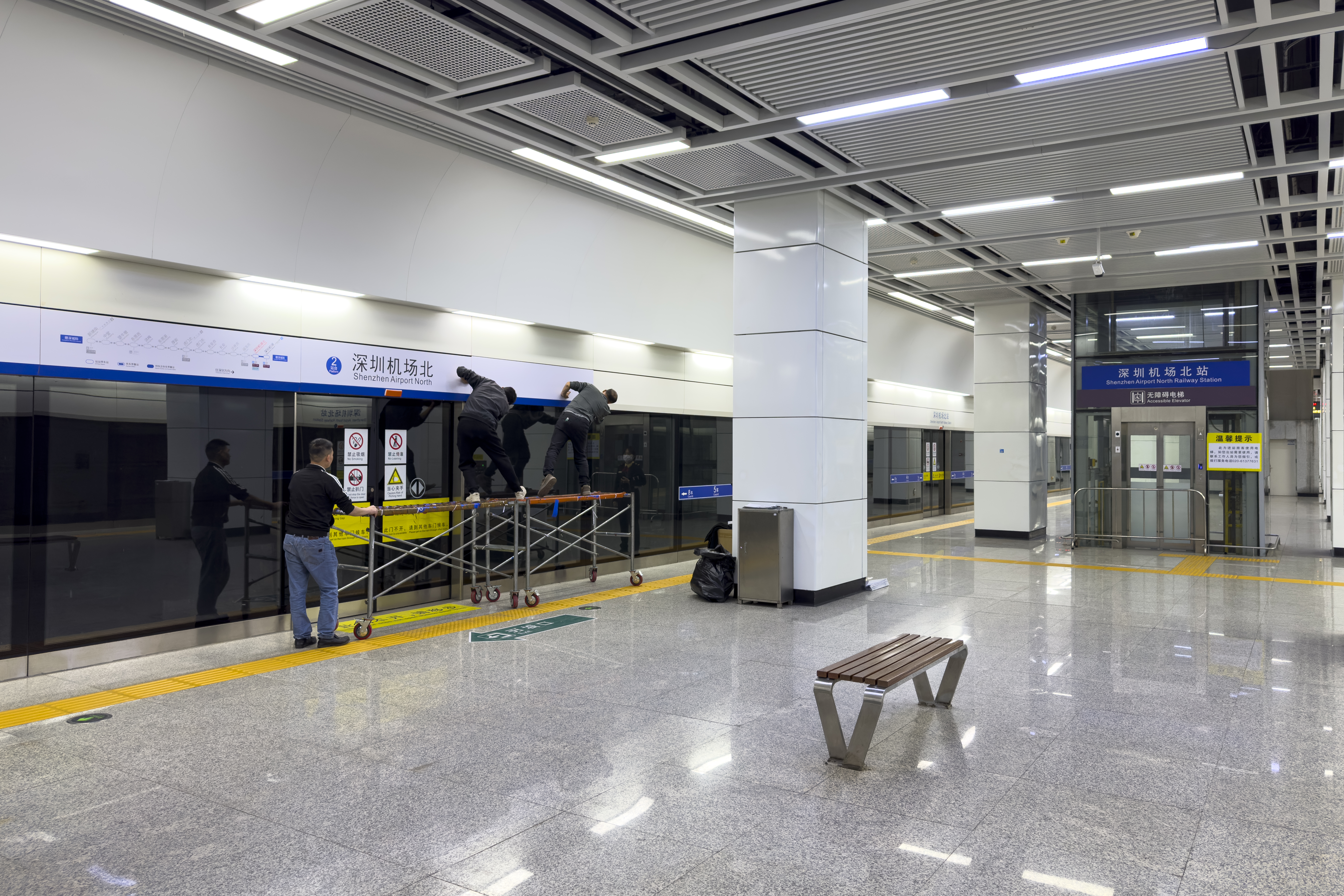
- Platform

Chinese name
- Simplified Chinese: 深圳机场北站
- Traditional Chinese: 深圳機場北站
Transcriptions
Standard Mandarin
- Hanyu Pinyin: Shēnzhènjīchángběi Zhàn
Yue: Cantonese
- Yale Romanization: Sāmjan Gēichèuhng Bāk Jaahm
- Jyutping: Sam^{1}zan^{3} Gei^{1}coeng^{4} Bak^{1} Zaam^{6}

General information
- Location: Shenzhen Bao'an International Airport, Fuyong Subdistrict, Bao'an District, Shenzhen, Guangdong; China
- Coordinates: 22°39′14″N 113°47′33″E
- Owner: Pearl River Delta Metropolitan Region intercity railway
- Operator: Guangdong Intercity
- Line: Guangzhou–Shenzhen intercity railway
- Platforms: 2 (1 island platform)
- Tracks: 2
- Connections: 11 20 Airport North

Construction
- Structure type: Underground
- Accessible: Yes

Other information
- Station code: SBA (Pinyin: SZB)

History
- Opened: 15 December 2019 (6 years ago)

Services
| Preceding station | Pearl River Delta Metropolitan Region Intercity Railway | Following station |
|---|---|---|
| Fuhai West towards Zhuliao | Guangzhou–Shenzhen intercity railway | Shenzhen Airport Terminus |
Location

Shenzhen Airport North railway station (simplified Chinese: 深圳机场北站; traditional Chinese: 深圳機場北站; pinyin: Shēnzhèn Jīcháng Běi Zhàn; Cantonese Yale: Sāmjan Gēichèuhng Bāk Jaahm) is an underground railway station in Bao'an District, Shenzhen, Guangdong, China. It opened on 15 December 2019. It is a supporting station for the planned Terminal T4 of Shenzhen Airport.

== History ==
The station began construction at the end of 2014 with the rest of the Shenzhen section of the Guangzhou–Shenzhen intercity railway. It opened on 15 December 2019.

== Gallery ==
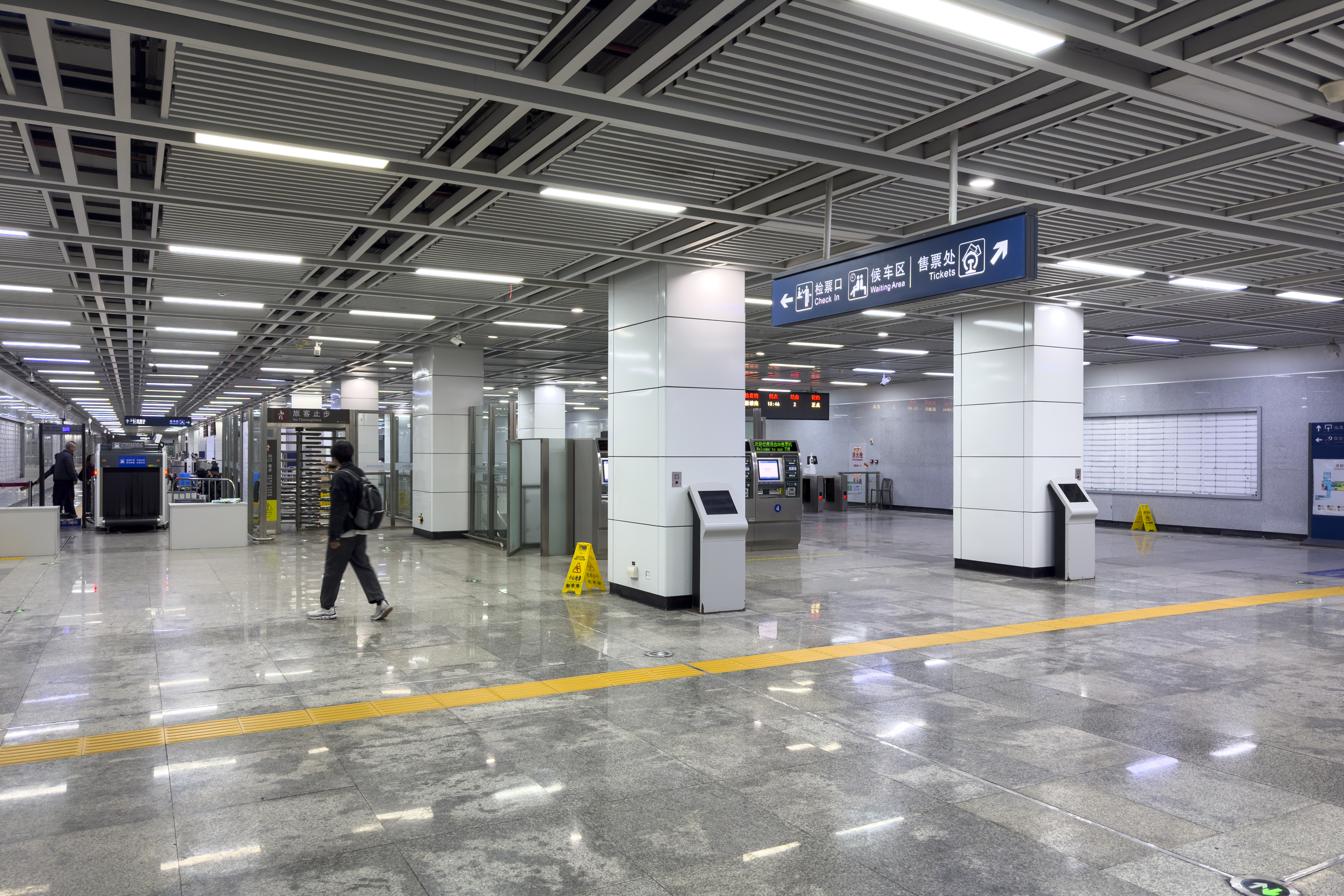
Concourse

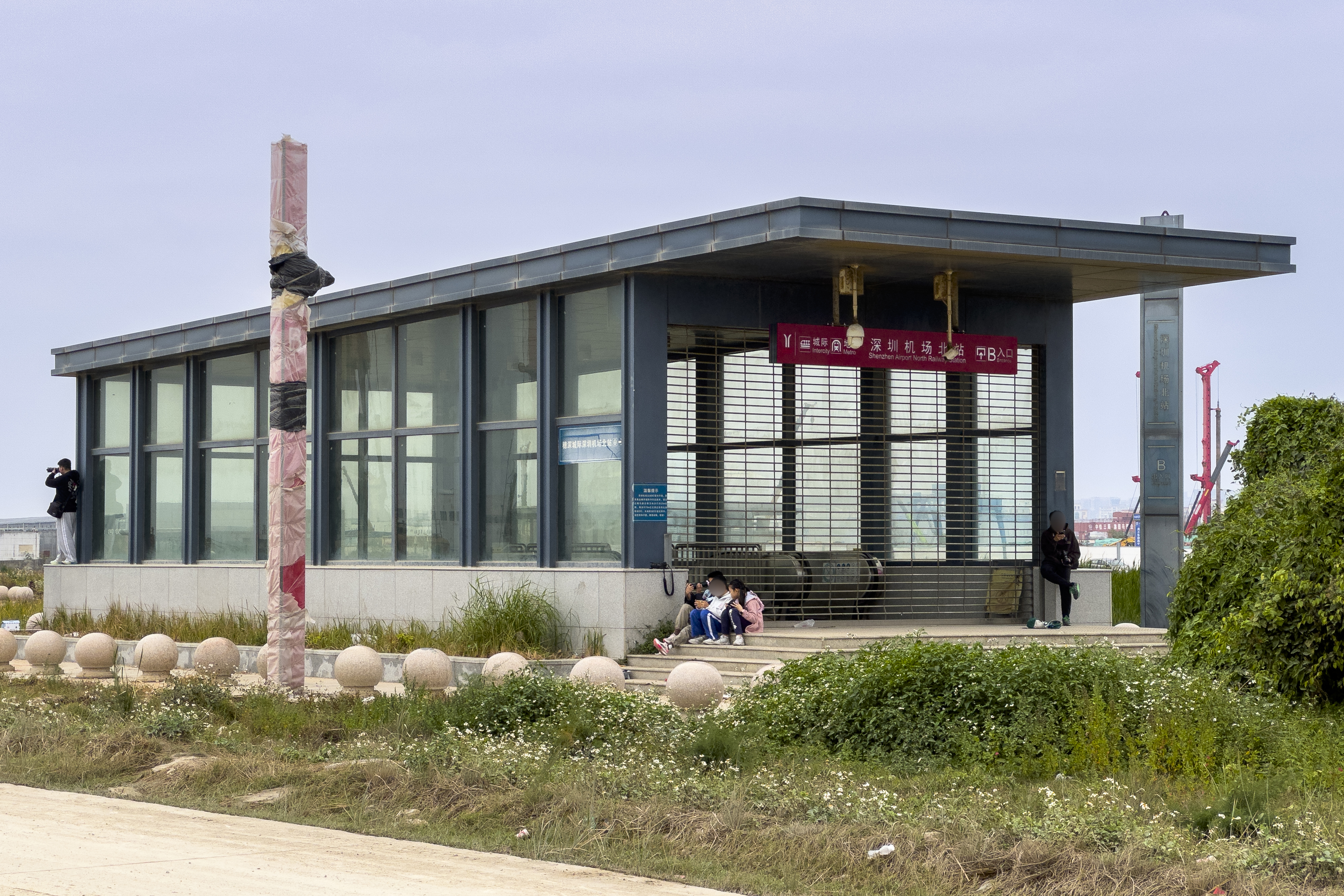
Exit B (under construction)
