= Fuhai West station (Shenzhen Metro) =

Shenzhen Metro Line 12 station

Fuhai West 福海西
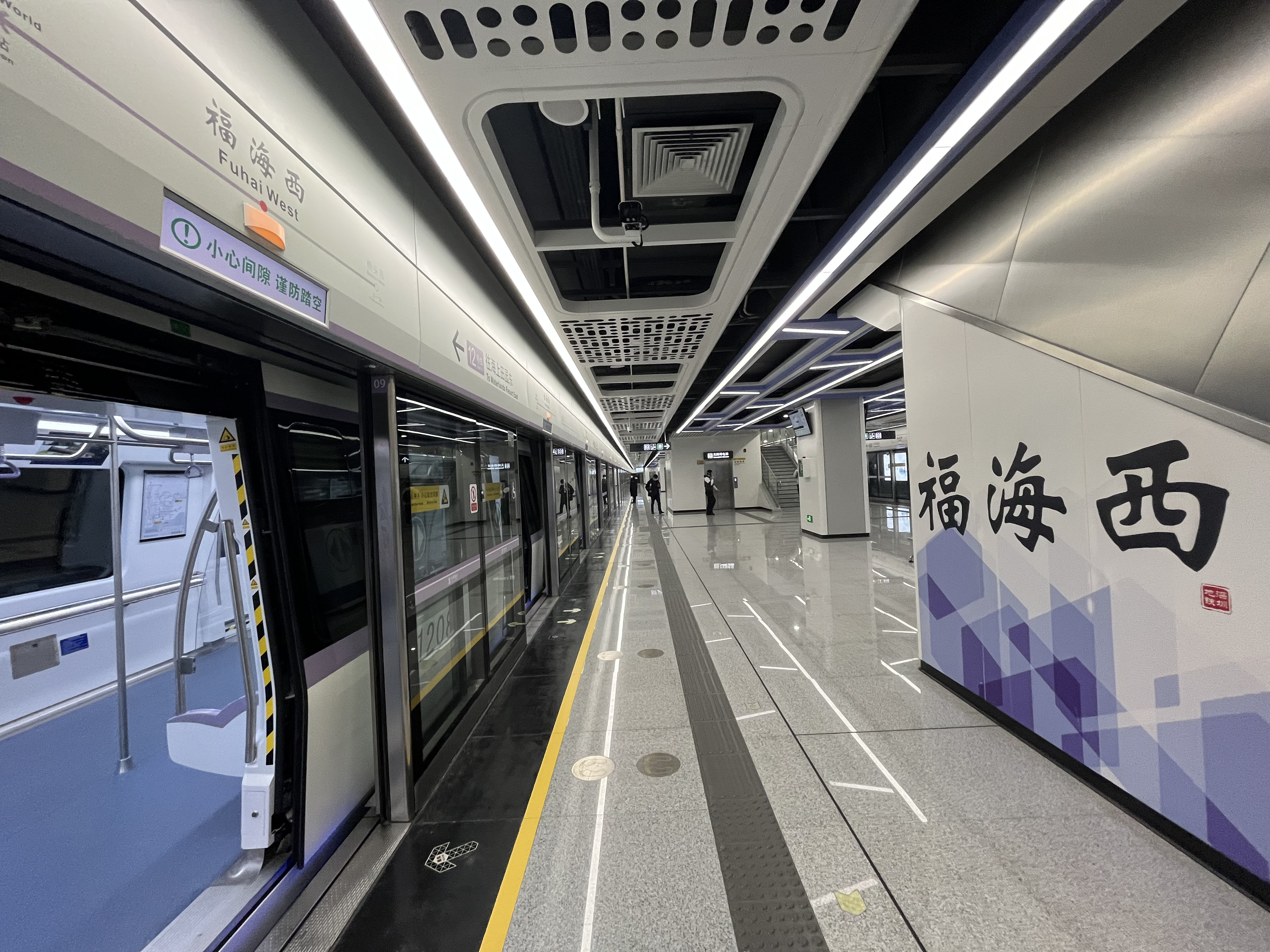
- Platform

Chinese name
- Chinese: 福海西
Transcriptions
Standard Mandarin
- Hanyu Pinyin: Fúhǎi Xī
Yue: Cantonese
- Yale Romanization: Fūkhói Sāi
- Jyutping: Fuk1 Hoi2 Sai1

General information
- Location: Intersection of Qiaohe Road and Songfu Avenue; Fuhai Subdistrict, Bao'an District, Shenzhen, Guangdong; China
- Coordinates: 22°41′9.2″N 113°47′2.0″E
- Operated by: Shenzhen Line 12 Rail Transit Co., Ltd (Shenzhen Metro Group and PowerChina PPP)
- Line: Line 12
- Platforms: 2 (1 island platform)
- Tracks: 2
- Connections: Fuhai West

Construction
- Structure type: Underground
- Accessible: Yes

History
- Opened: 28 November 2022 (3 years ago)

Services
Preceding station	Shenzhen Metro	Following station
Shenzhen World towards Songgang	Line 12	Qiaotou West towards Zuopaotai East
Location

Fuhai West station (Chinese: 福海西; pinyin: Fúhǎi Xī; Cantonese Yale: Fūkhói Sāi) is a metro station on Line 12 of Shenzhen Metro. It opened on 28 November 2022. The station is located underneath the Guangzhou-Shenzhen intercity railway Viaduct, and is the first metro station in China to be built under a railway viaduct.

== Station layout ==
The station has an island platform under Qiaohe Road.

G	–	Exits A-D
B1F; Concourse	Lobby	Ticket Machines, Customer Service, Station Control Room
B2F; Platforms	Platform	12 towards Songgang (Shenzhen World)
B2F; Platforms	Island platform, doors will open on the left
B2F; Platforms	Platform	12 towards Zuopaotai East (Qiaotou West)

=== Entrances/exits ===
The station has 4 points of entry/exit, with Exits C and D being accessible via elevators.

Exit	Destination
Exit A	Qiaohe Road (S), Songfu Avenue (W), Dejin Garden, Dejin Industrial Park
Exit B	Qiaohe Road (S), Songfu Avenue (E), Baigang City Peace Center, Peace Dayou Industry and Trade Building
Exit C	Qiaohe Road (N), Songfu Avenue (W), Pearl River Delta Metropolitan Region intercity railway Fuhai West Station (Entrance B), Fuhai Street Office, Xingping Estate
Exit D	Qiaohe Road (N), Songfu Avenue (E), Pearl River Delta Metropolitan Region intercity railway Fuhai West Station (Entrance C), Hetai Industrial Zone

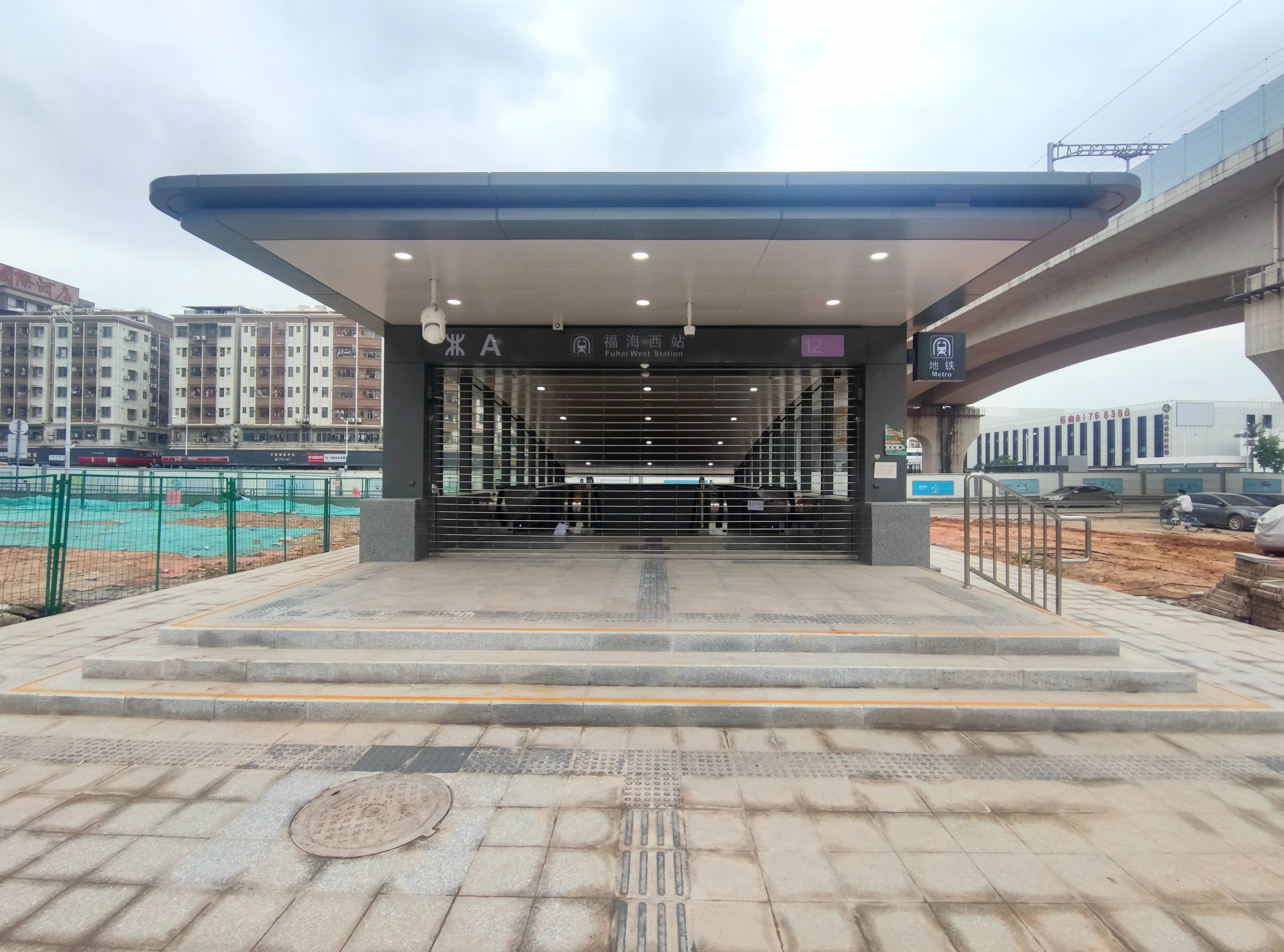
Entrance A

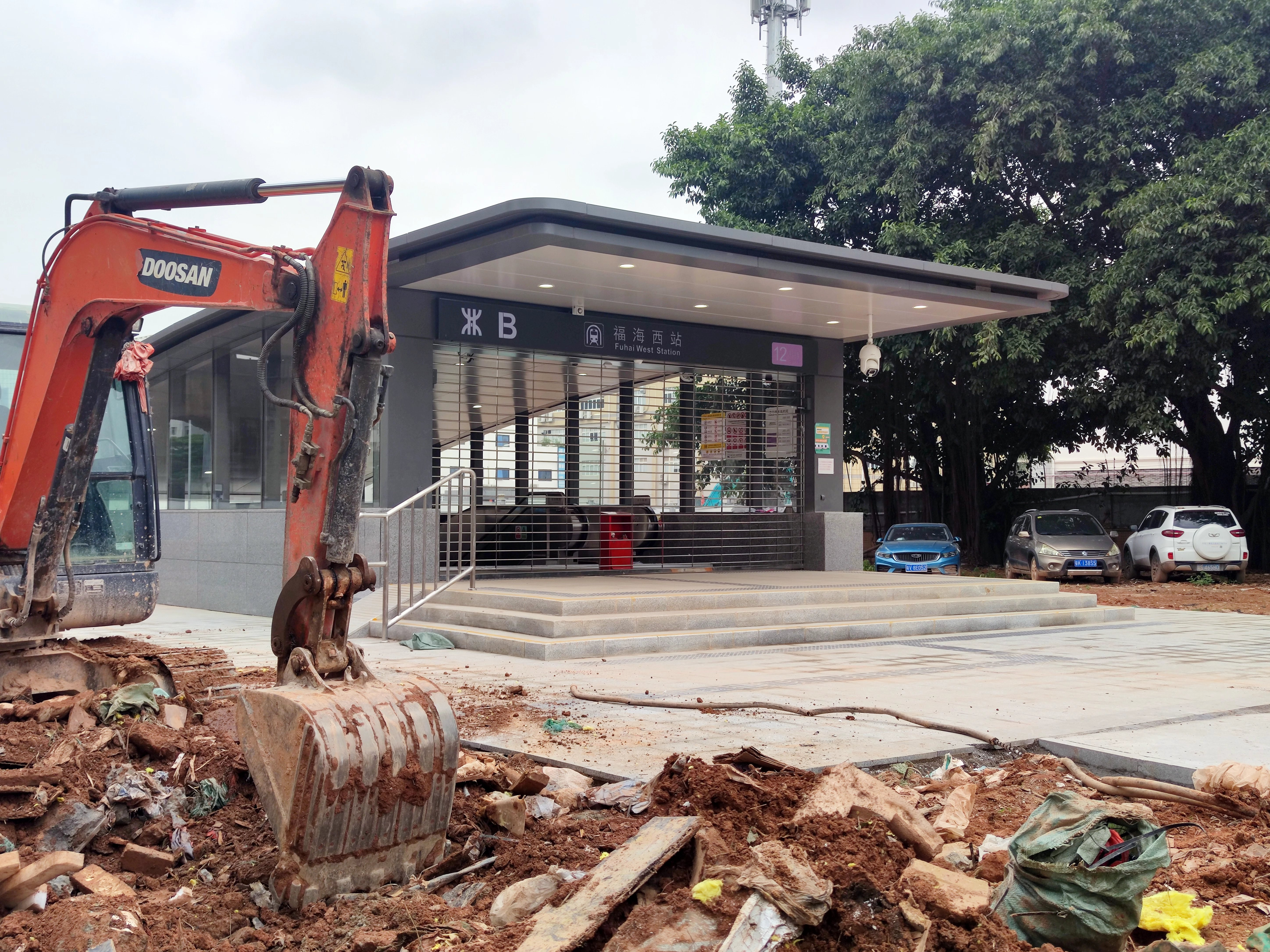
Entrance B

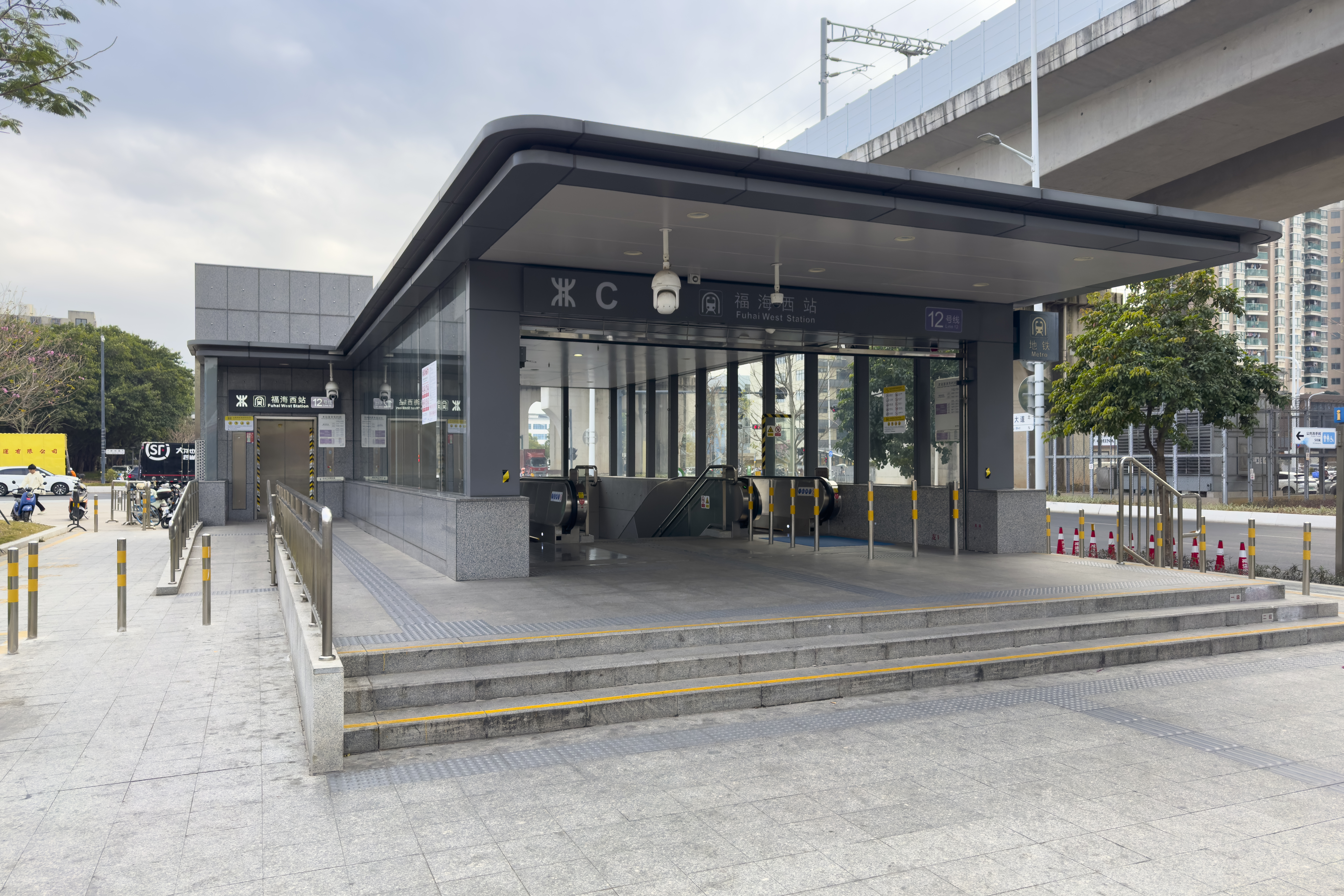
Entrance C

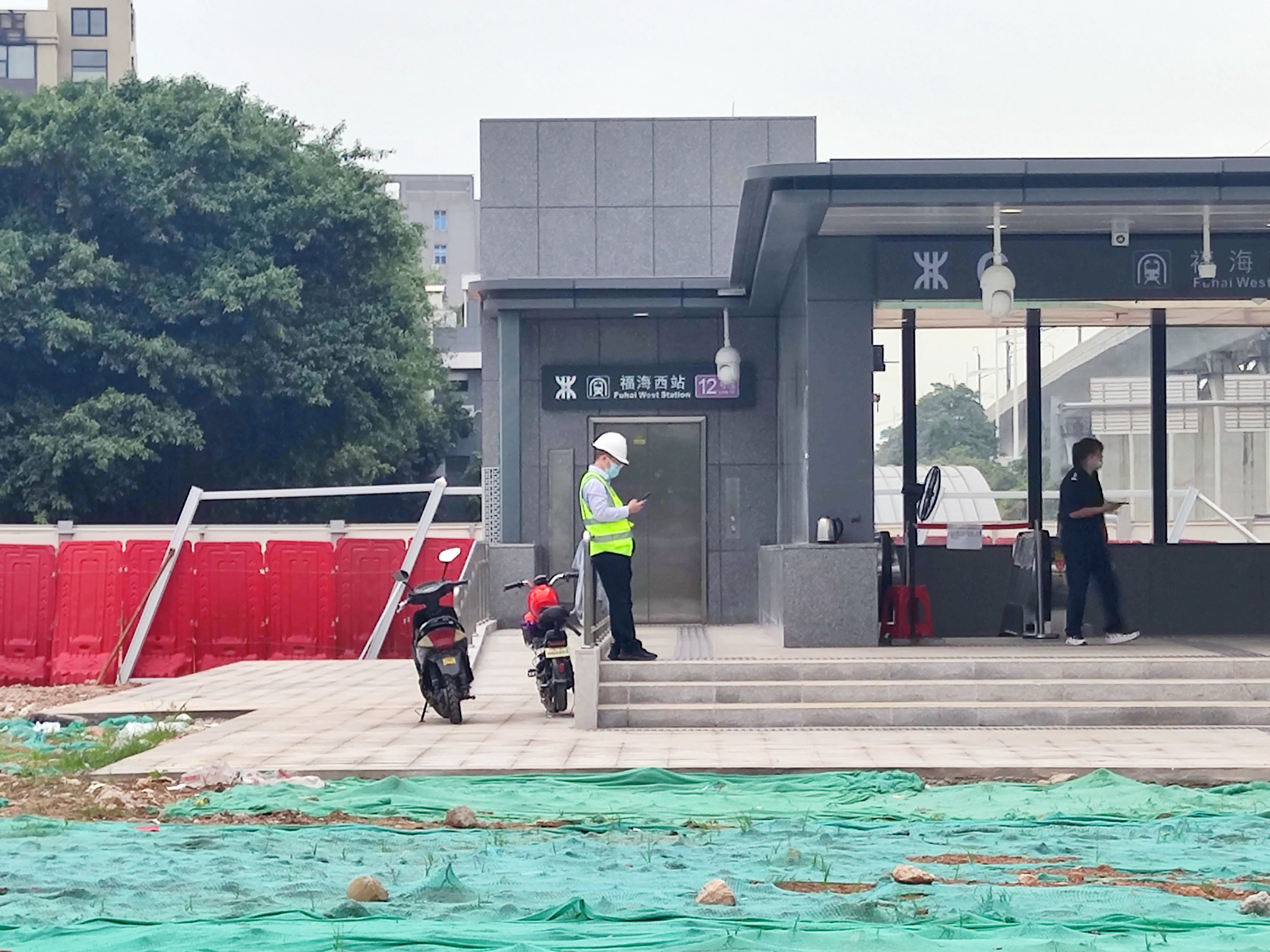
Entrance C (elevator entrance)

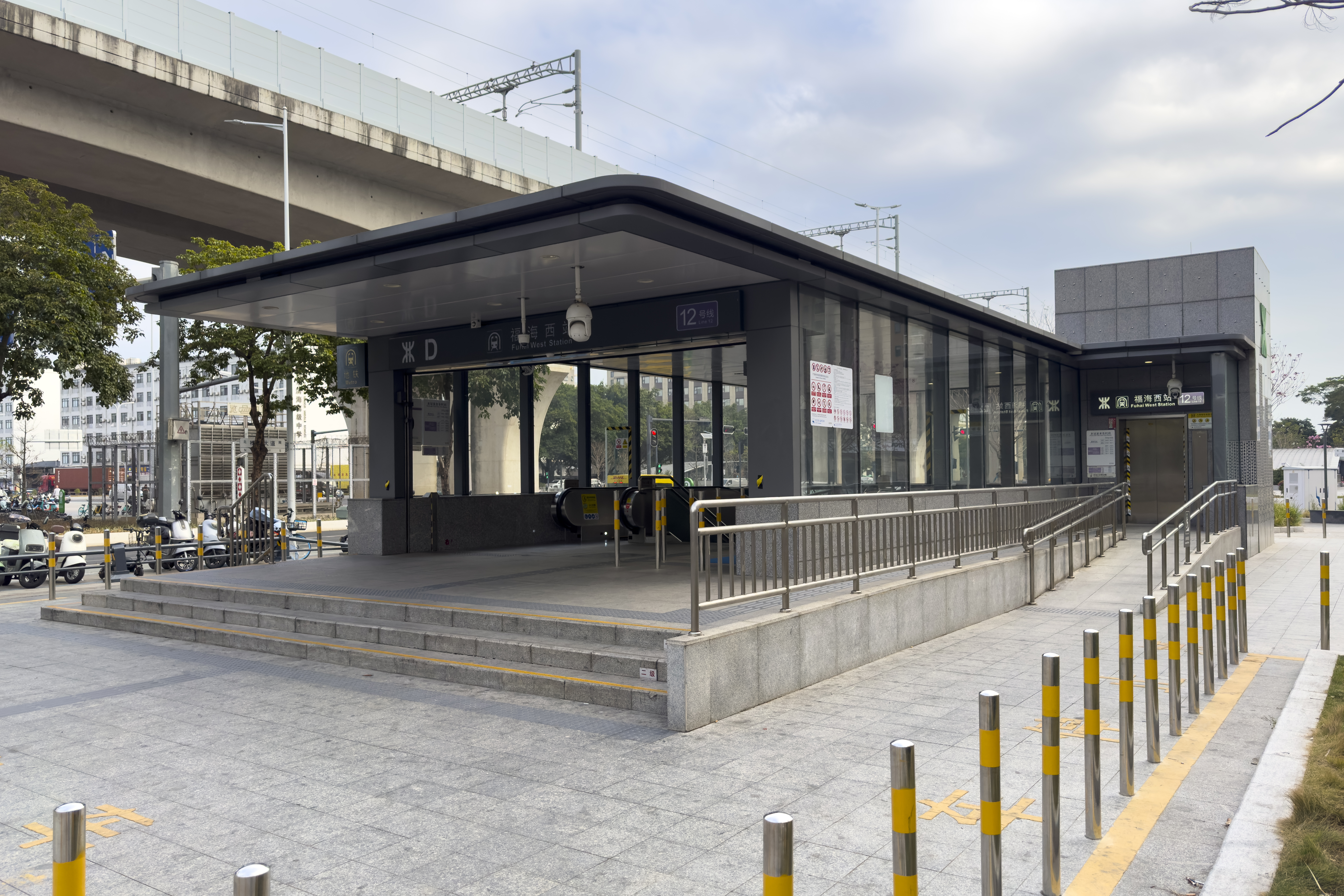
Entrance D

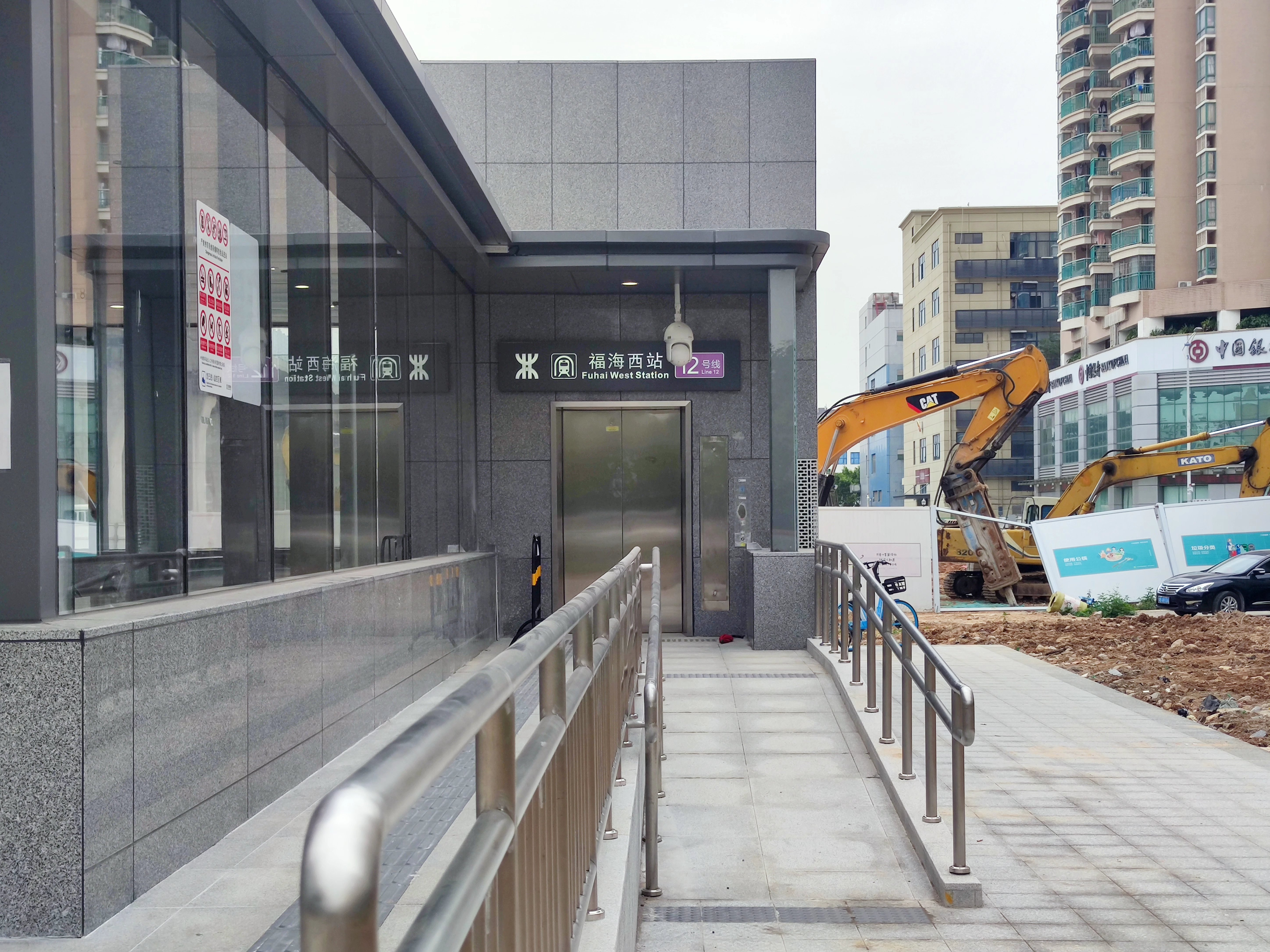
Entrance D (elevator entrance)
