= Qiaotou West station =

Shenzhen Metro Line 12 station

Qiaotou West 桥头西
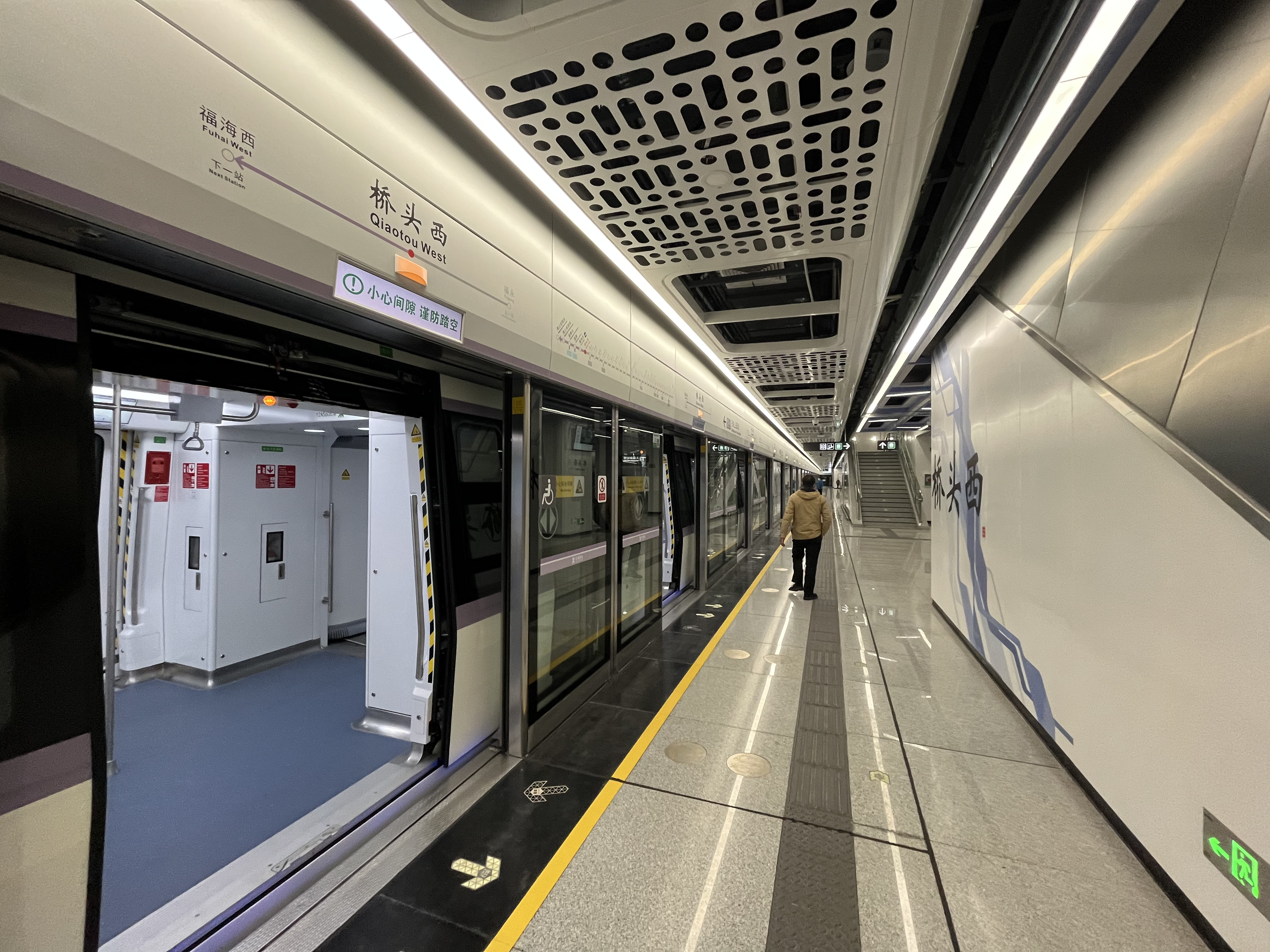
- Platform

Chinese name
- Traditional Chinese: 橋頭西
- Simplified Chinese: 桥头西
Transcriptions
Standard Mandarin
- Hanyu Pinyin: Qiáotóu Xī
Yue: Cantonese
- Yale Romanization: Kìuhtàuh Sāi
- Jyutping: Kiu4 tau4 Sai1

General information
- Location: Intersection of Qiaotou Tongfu Road and Chongqing Road; Fuhai Subdistrict, Bao'an District, Shenzhen, Guangdong; China
- Coordinates: 22°41′9.953″N 113°47′34.674″E
- Operated by: Shenzhen Line 12 Rail Transit Co., Ltd (Shenzhen Metro Group and PowerChina PPP)
- Line: Line 12
- Platforms: 2 (1 island platform)
- Tracks: 2

Construction
- Structure type: Underground
- Accessible: Yes

History
- Opened: 28 November 2022 (3 years ago)
- Previous names: Yonghe (永和)

Services
Preceding station	Shenzhen Metro	Following station
Fuhai West towards Songgang	Line 12	Fuyong towards Zuopaotai East
Location

Qiaotou West station (simplified Chinese: 桥头西; traditional Chinese: 橋頭西; pinyin: Qiáotóu Xī; Cantonese Yale: Kìuhtàuh Sāi) is a metro station on Line 12 of Shenzhen Metro. It opened on 28 November 2022.

== Station layout ==
The station has an island platform under Qiaotou Tongfu Road.

G	–	Exits A-C
B1F; Concourse	Lobby	Ticket Machines, Customer Service, Station Control Room
B2F; Platforms	Platform	12 towards Songgang (Fuhai West)
B2F; Platforms	Island platform, doors will open on the left
B2F; Platforms	Platform	12 towards Zuopaotai East (Fuyong)

=== Entrances/exits ===
The station has 3 points of entry/exit, with Exit B being accessible via elevator.

Exit	Destination
Exit A	Qiaotou Tongfu Road (E), Chongqing Road (S), Flextronics Electronic Equipment Shenzhen Co., Ltd, Fuqiao Industrial Zone
Exit B	Qiaotou Tongfu Road (E), Chongqing Road (N), Xinfeng Electric Appliance (Shenzhen) Co., Ltd., Heshun New Estate
Exit C	Qiaotou Tongfu Road (W), Chongqing Road (S), Huashengchang Science and Technology Park, Junfeng Business Building

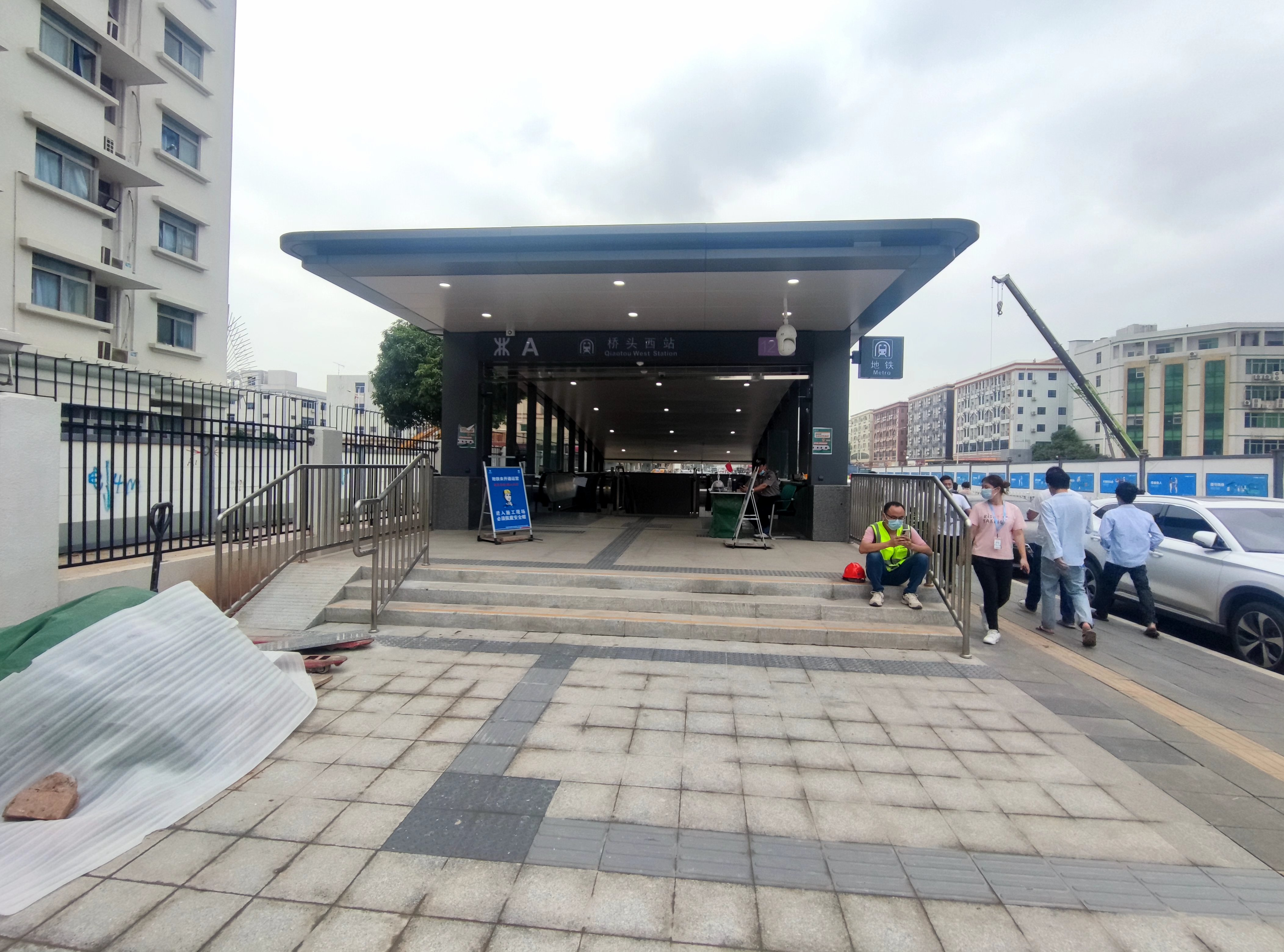
Entrance A

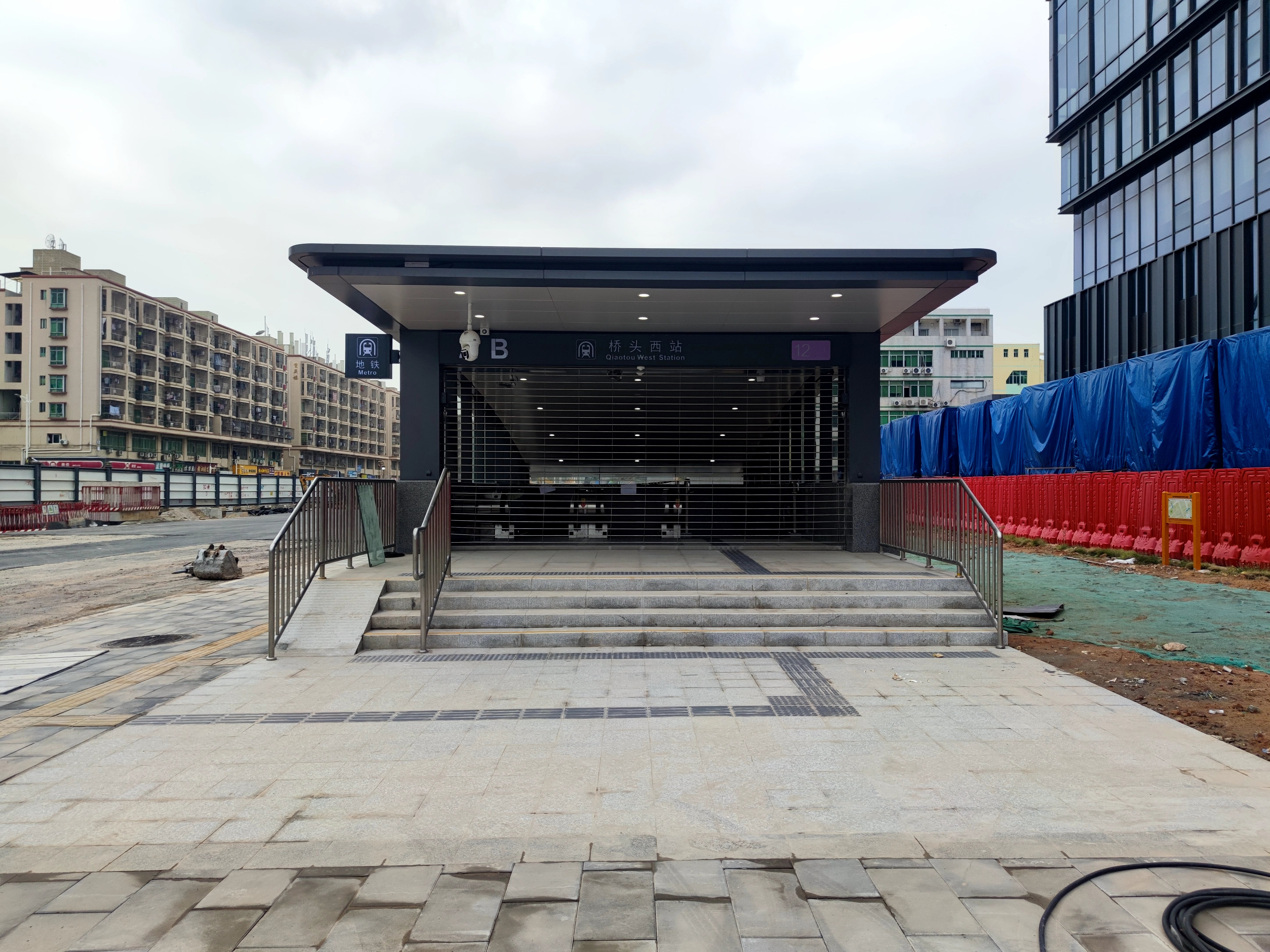
Entrance B

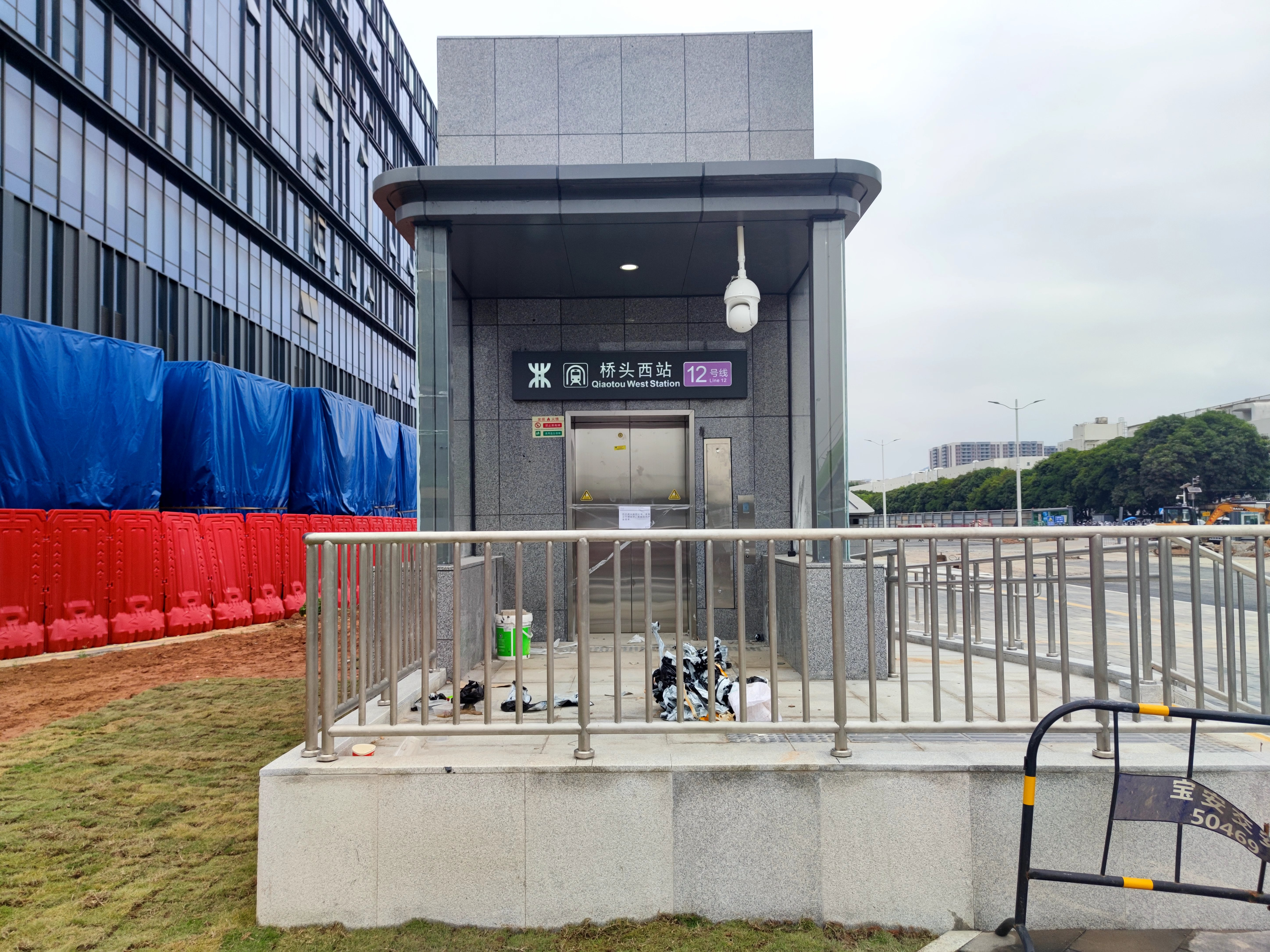
Entrance B (elevator entrance)

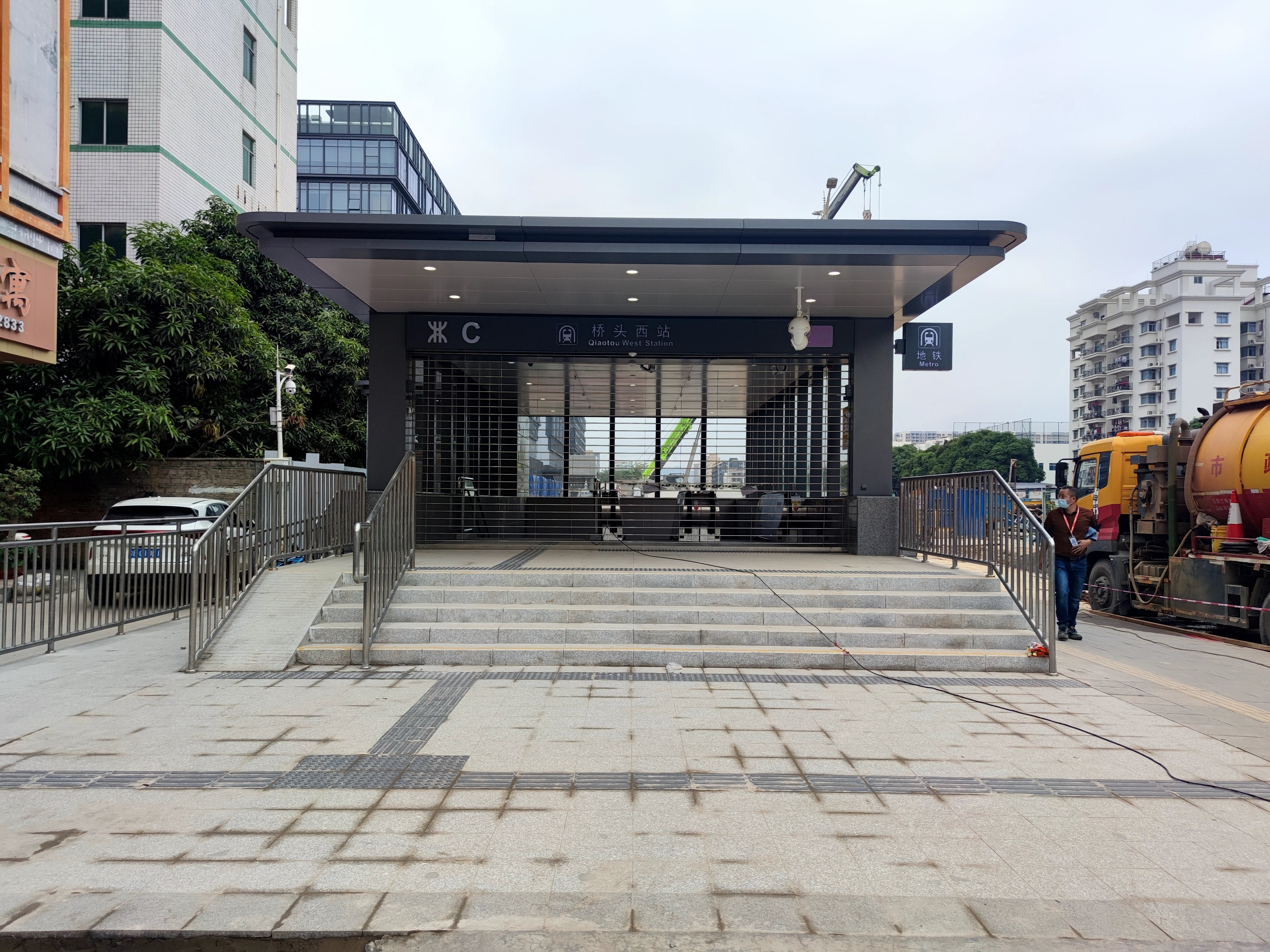
Entrance C
