= Shenzhen Airport railway station =

Railway station in Guangdong, China

Shenzhen Airport 深圳机场
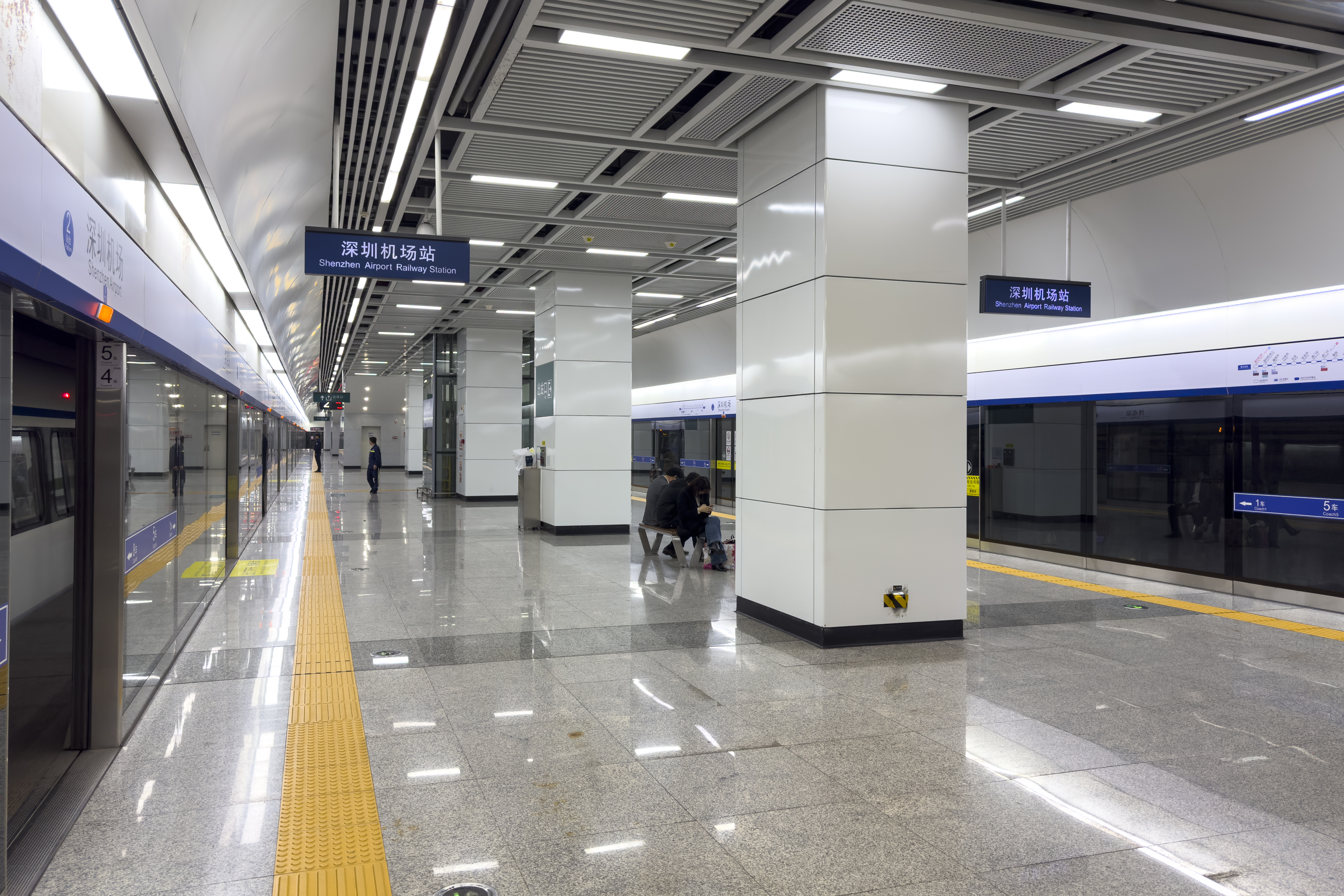
- Platform

Chinese name
- Simplified Chinese: 深圳机场站
- Traditional Chinese: 深圳機場站
Transcriptions
Standard Mandarin
- Hanyu Pinyin: Shēnzhèn Jīcháng Zhàn
Yue: Cantonese
- Yale Romanization: Sāmjan Gēichèuhng Jaahm
- Jyutping: Sam^{1}zan^{3} Gei^{1}coeng^{4} Zaam^{6}

General information
- Location: Shenzhen Bao'an International Airport, Fuyong Subdistrict, Bao'an District, Shenzhen, Guangdong; China
- Coordinates: 22°37′30″N 113°48′28″E
- Owner: Pearl River Delta Metropolitan Region intercity railway
- Operator: Guangdong Intercity
- Line: Guangzhou–Shenzhen intercity railway
- Platforms: 2 (1 island platform)
- Tracks: 2
- Connections: Shenzhen Bao'an International Airport; 11 Airport

Construction
- Structure type: Underground
- Accessible: Yes

Other information
- Station code: SCA (Pinyin: SZC)

History
- Opened: 15 December 2019 (6 years ago)

Services
Preceding station	Pearl River Delta Metropolitan Region Intercity Railway	Following station
Shenzhen Airport North towards Zhuliao	Guangzhou–Shenzhen intercity railway	Terminus
Location

Shenzhen Airport railway station (simplified Chinese: 深圳机场站; traditional Chinese: 深圳機場站; pinyin: Shēnzhèn Jīcháng Zhàn; Cantonese Yale: Sāmjan Gēichèuhng Jaahm) is an underground railway station underneath Terminal T3 of Shenzhen Bao'an International Airport in Bao'an District, Shenzhen, Guangdong, China. It opened on 15 December 2019, and is the current southern terminus of the line.

== History ==
The station began construction at the end of 2014 with the rest of the Shenzhen section of the Guangzhou–Shenzhen intercity railway. It opened on 15 December 2019.

== Gallery ==
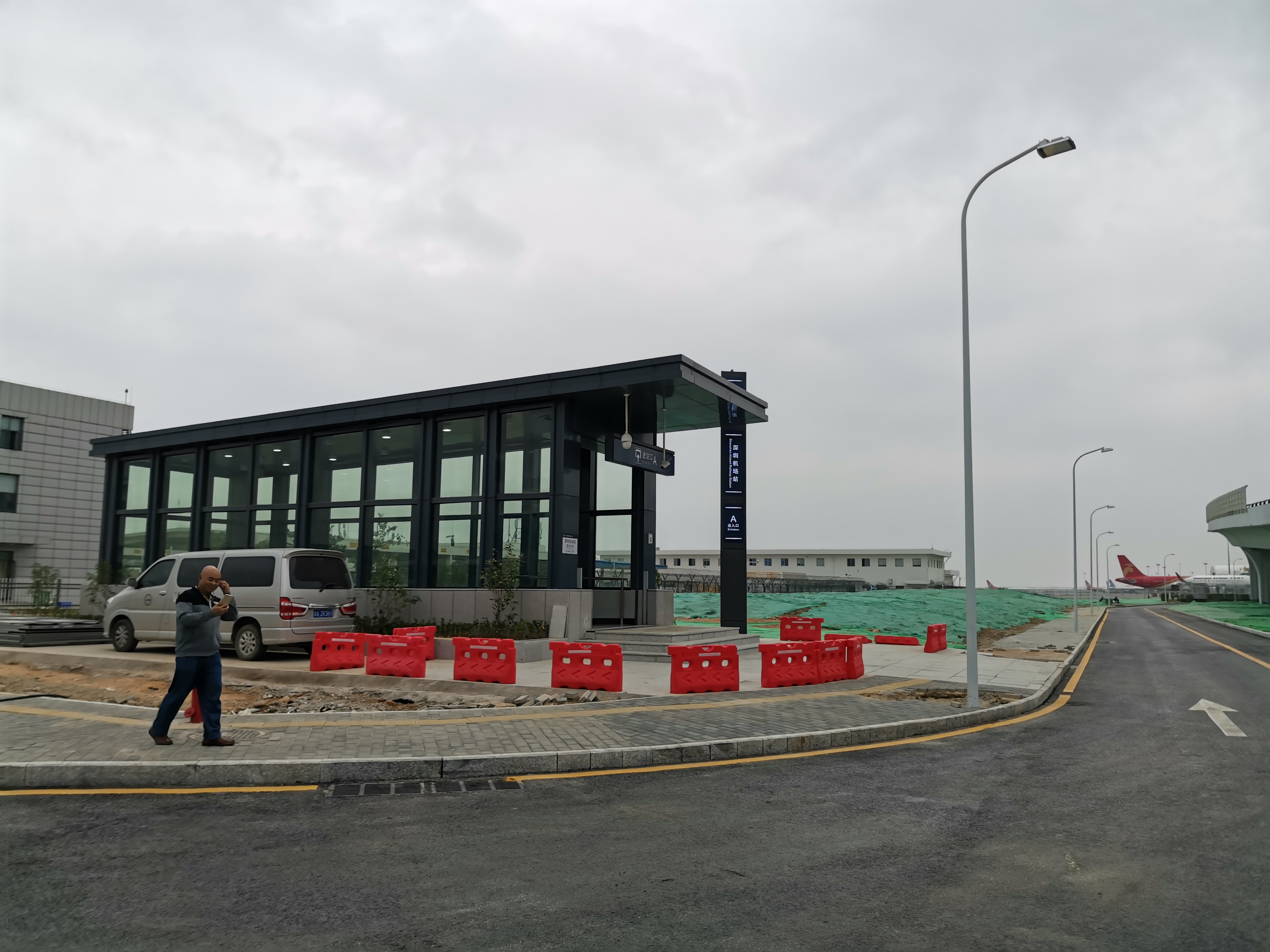
Exit A

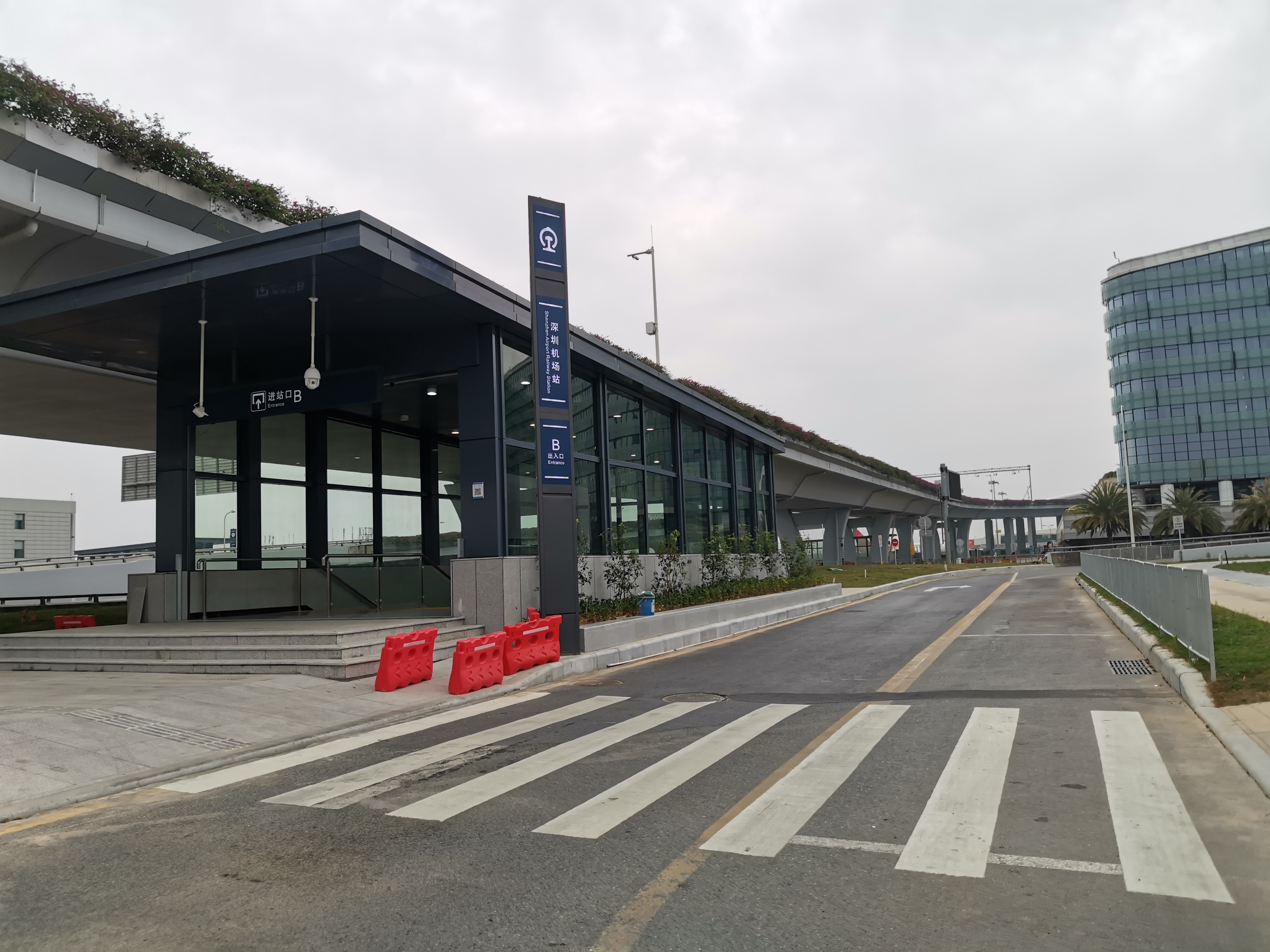
Exit B

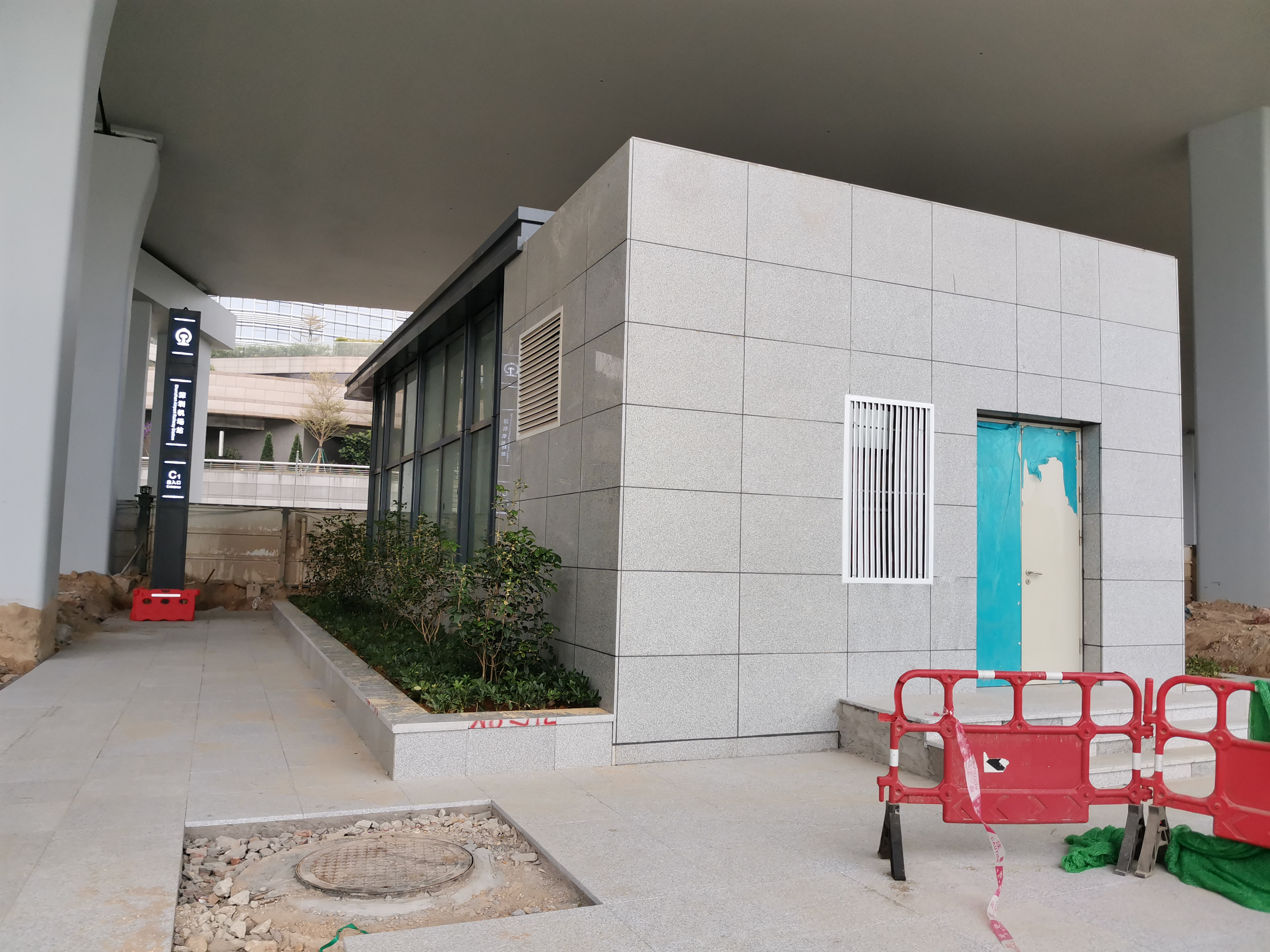
Exit C1 (unopened)

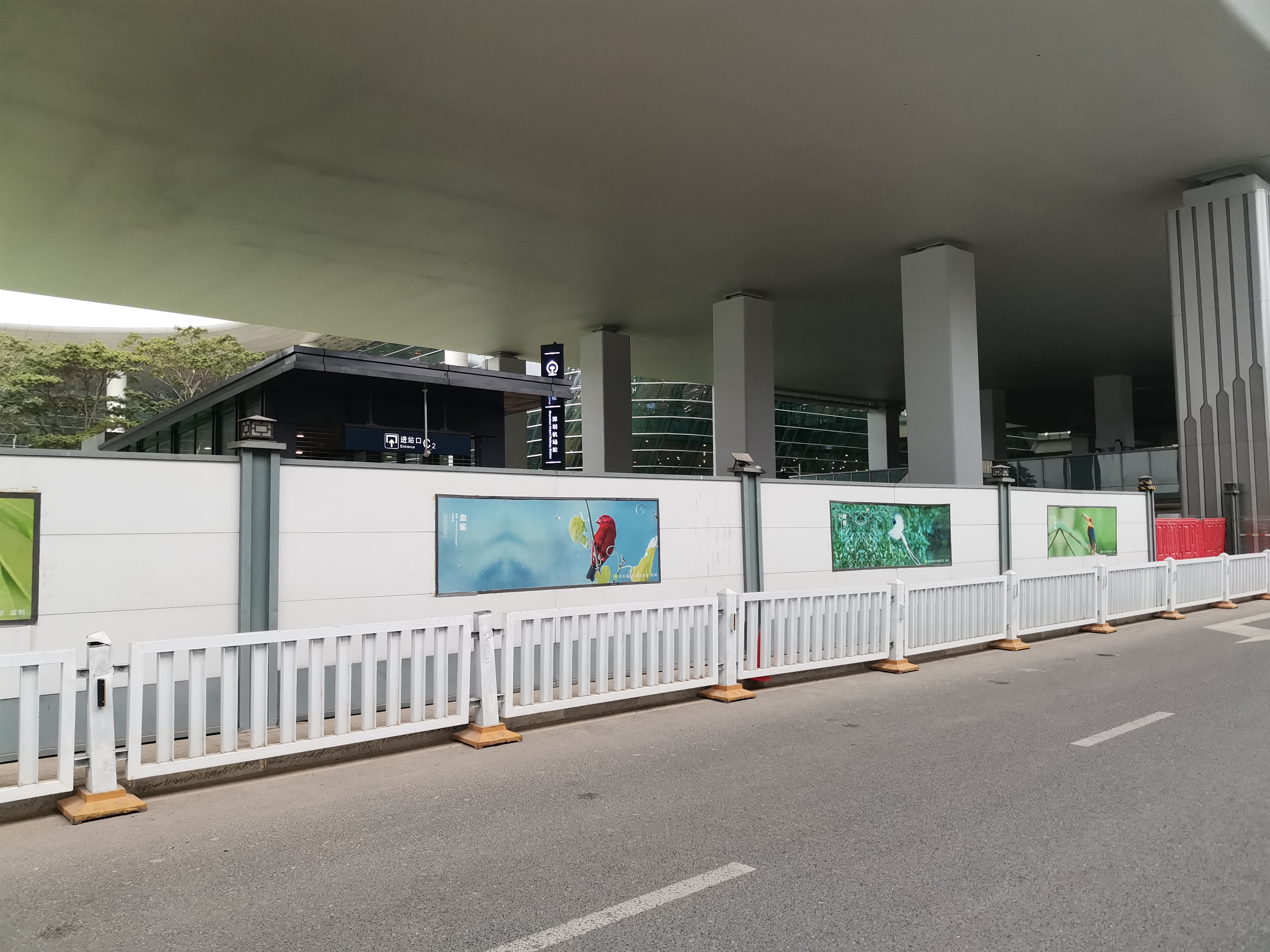
Exit C2 (unopened)
