= Langxia station =

Shenzhen Metro Line 12 station

Langxia 朗下
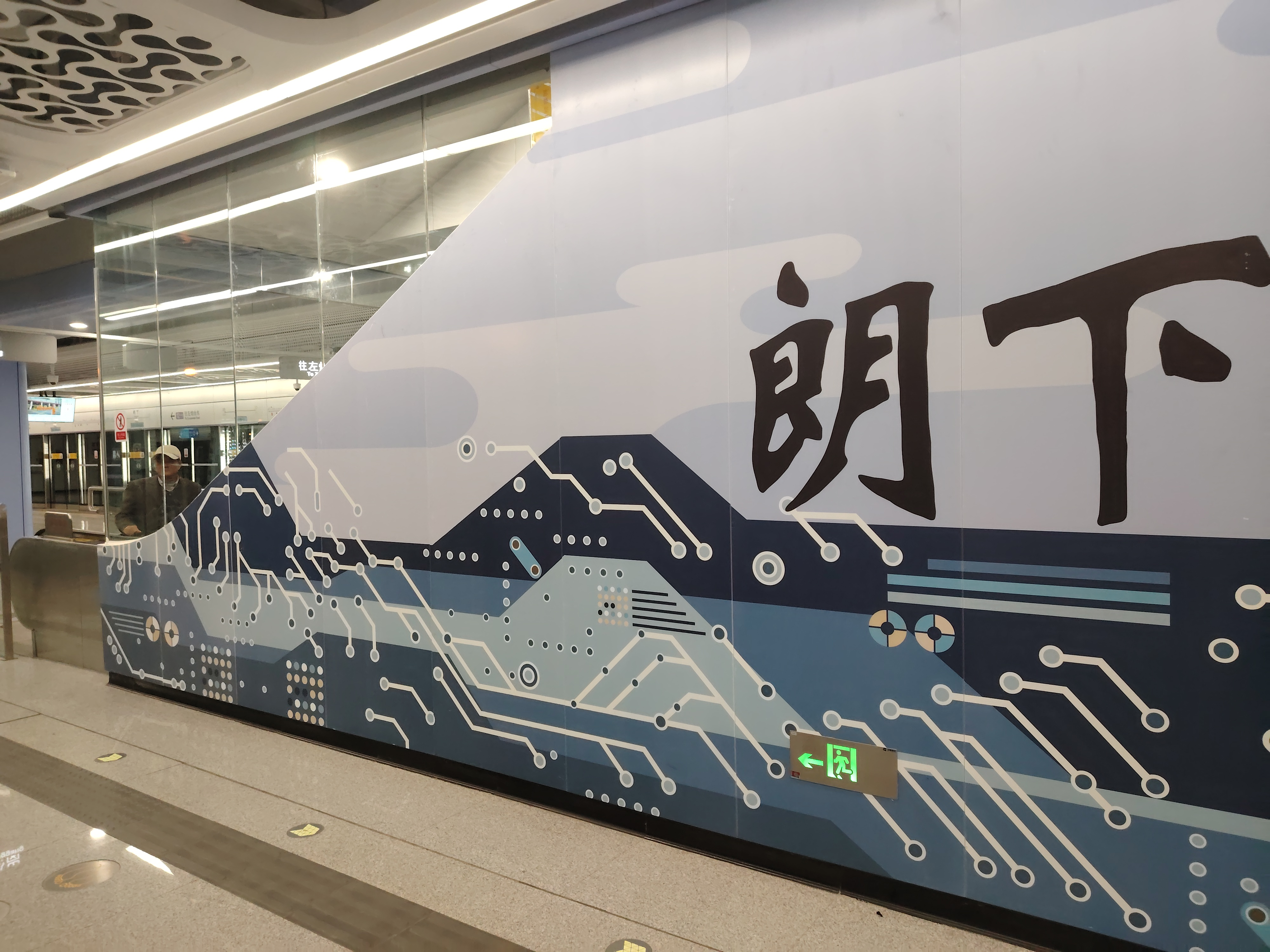
- Platform

Chinese name
- Chinese: 朗下
Transcriptions
Standard Mandarin
- Hanyu Pinyin: Lǎngxià
Yue: Cantonese
- Yale Romanization: Lóhnghah
- Jyutping: Long5haa6

General information
- Location: Intersection of Shajiang West Road (沙江西路) and Song'an Road (松安路); Shajing Subdistrict, Bao'an District, Shenzhen, Guangdong; China
- Coordinates: 22°46′13.343″N 113°48′46.685″E
- Operated by: Shenzhen Line 12 Rail Transit Co., Ltd (Shenzhen Metro Group and PowerChina PPP)
- Line: Line 12
- Platforms: 2 (1 island platform)
- Tracks: 2

Construction
- Structure type: Underground
- Accessible: Yes

History
- Opened: 28 December 2024 (17 months ago)
- Previous names: Shapu (沙埔)

Services
| Preceding station | Shenzhen Metro | Following station |
|---|---|---|
| Songgang Terminus | Line 12 | Buchong towards Zuopaotai East |
Location

Langxia station (Chinese: 朗下站; pinyin: Lǎngxià Zhàn; Jyutping: Long5 Haa6 Zaam6; Cantonese Yale: Lóhnghah Jaahm) is a station on Line 12 of Shenzhen Metro. It opened on 28 December 2024, and is located in Shajing Subdistrict in Bao'an District.

== Station layout ==
| G | - | Exits A-D |
| B1F; Concourse | Lobby | Ticket Machines, Customer Service, Vending Machines, Control Room |
| B2F; Platforms | Platform | 12 towards Songgang (terminus) |
| B2F; Platforms | Island platform, doors will open on the left |
| B2F; Platforms | Platform | 12 towards Zuopaotai East (Buchong) |

=== Entrances/exits ===
The station has 4 points of entry/exit, with Exits A and C being accessible via elevators. Exit B has a toilet.

- A: Shajing West Road, Shapuwei Maozhouhe Industrial Zone
- B: Song'an Road
- C: Song'an Road
- D: Shajing West Road, Langxia Third Industrial Zone
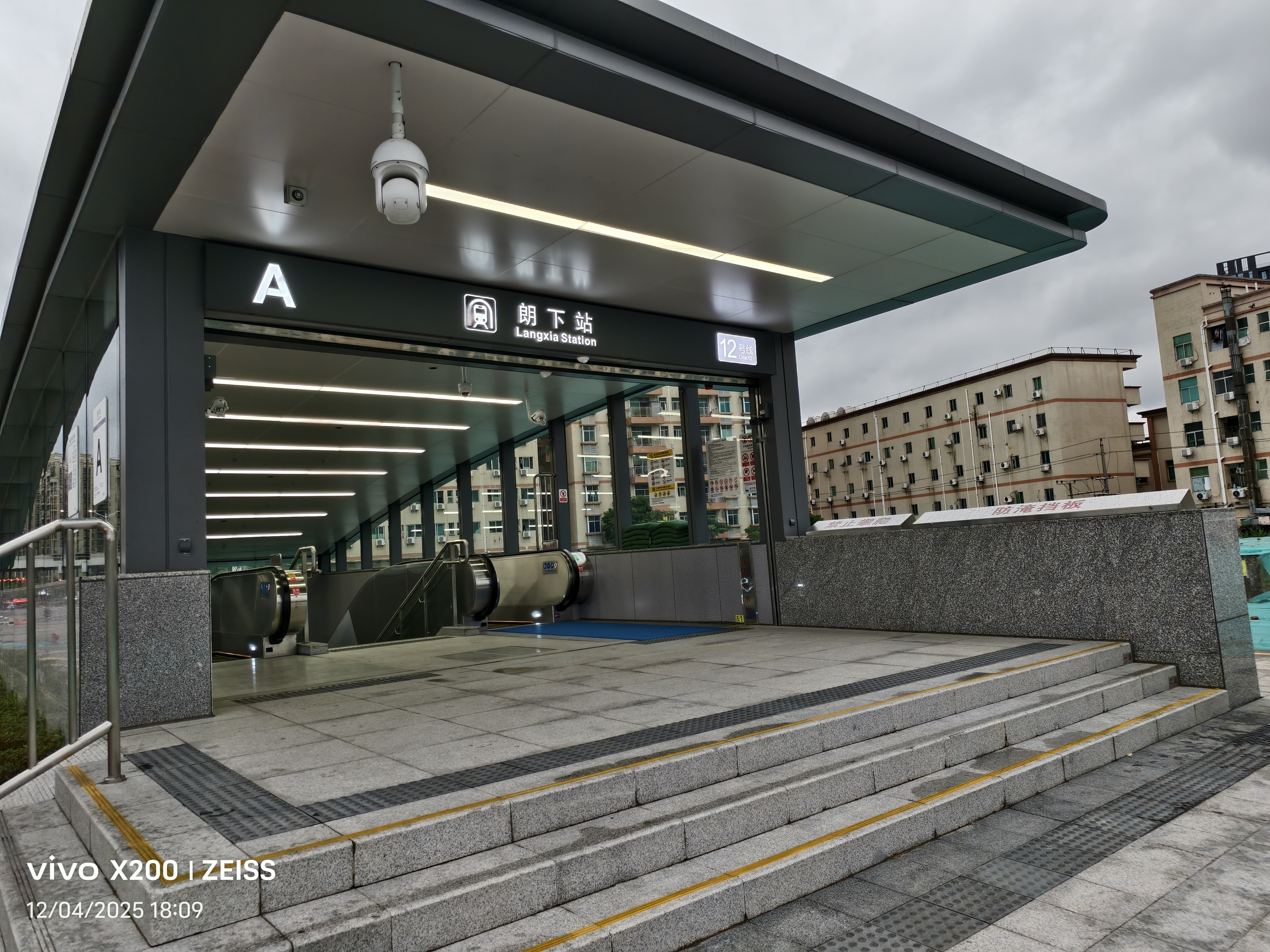
Entrance A

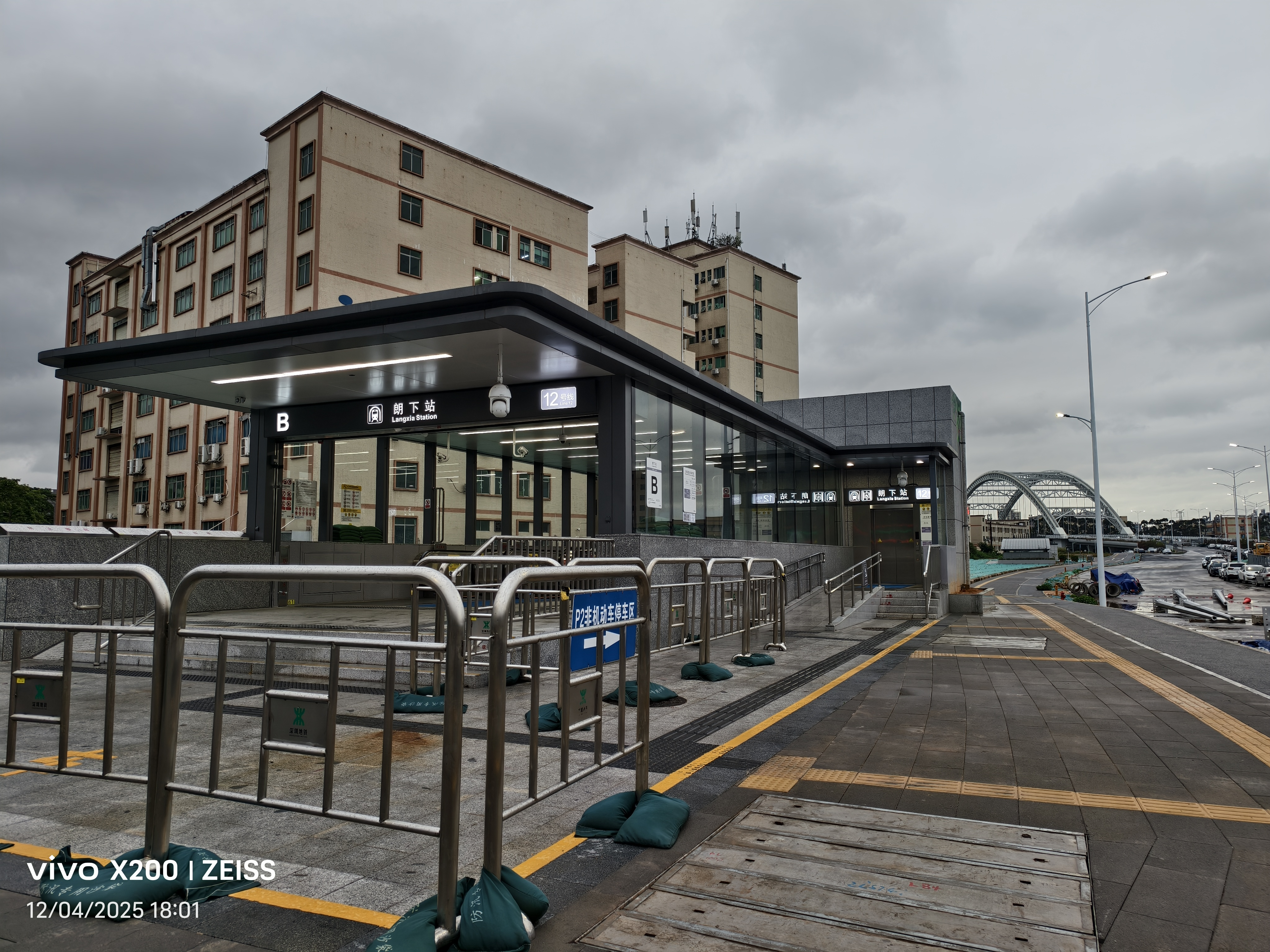
Entrance B

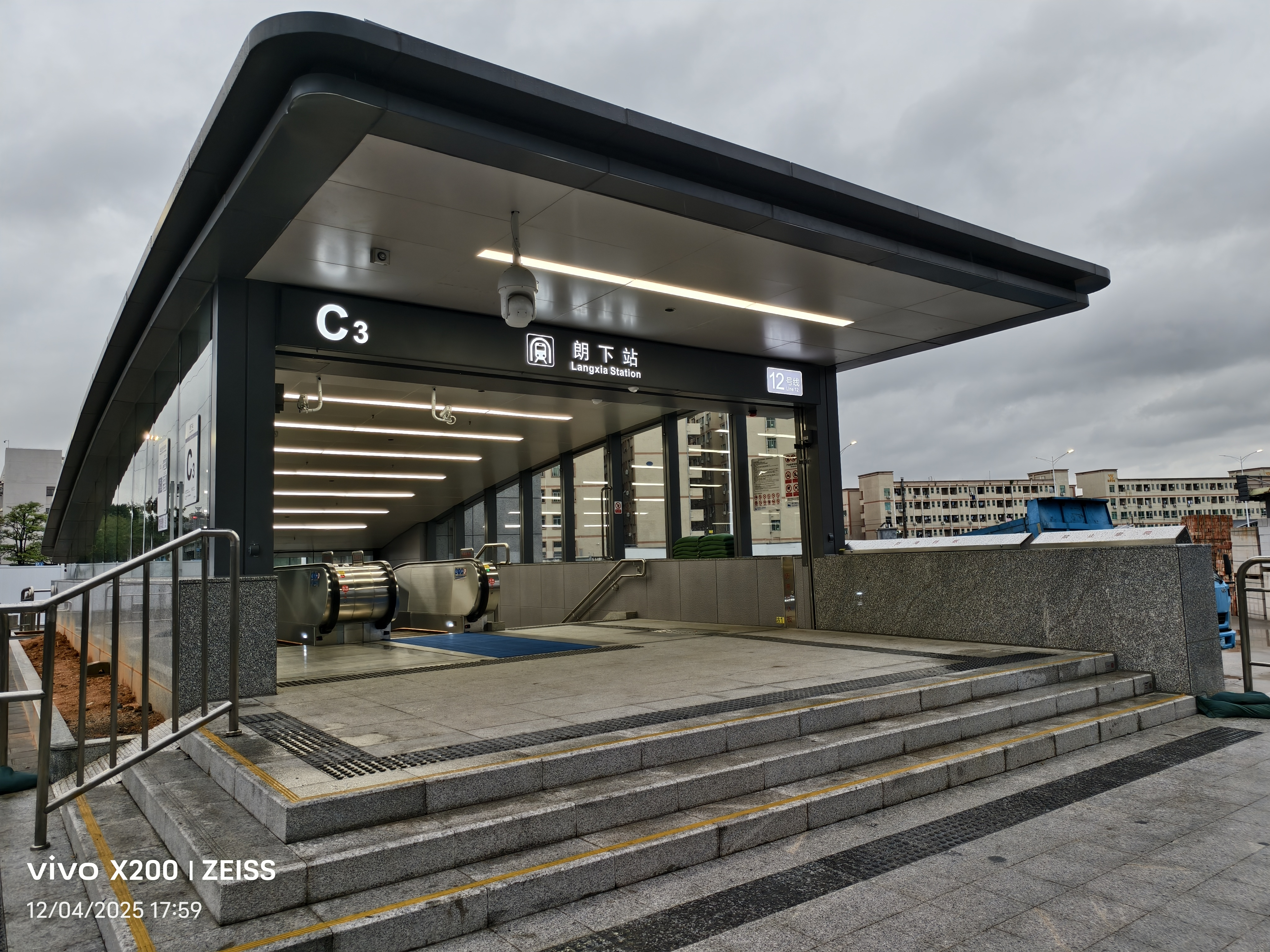
Entrance C

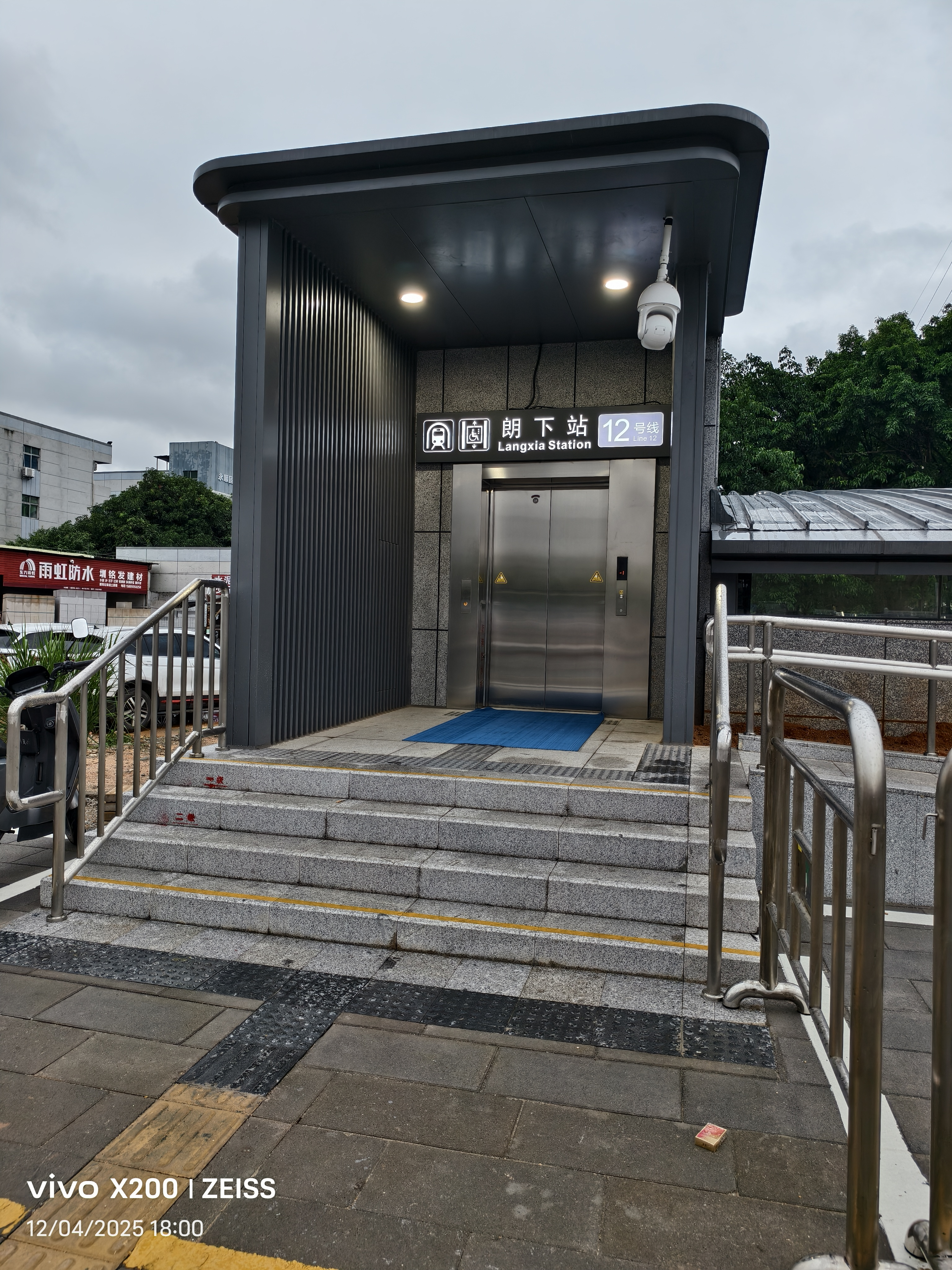
Entrance C (elevator entrance)

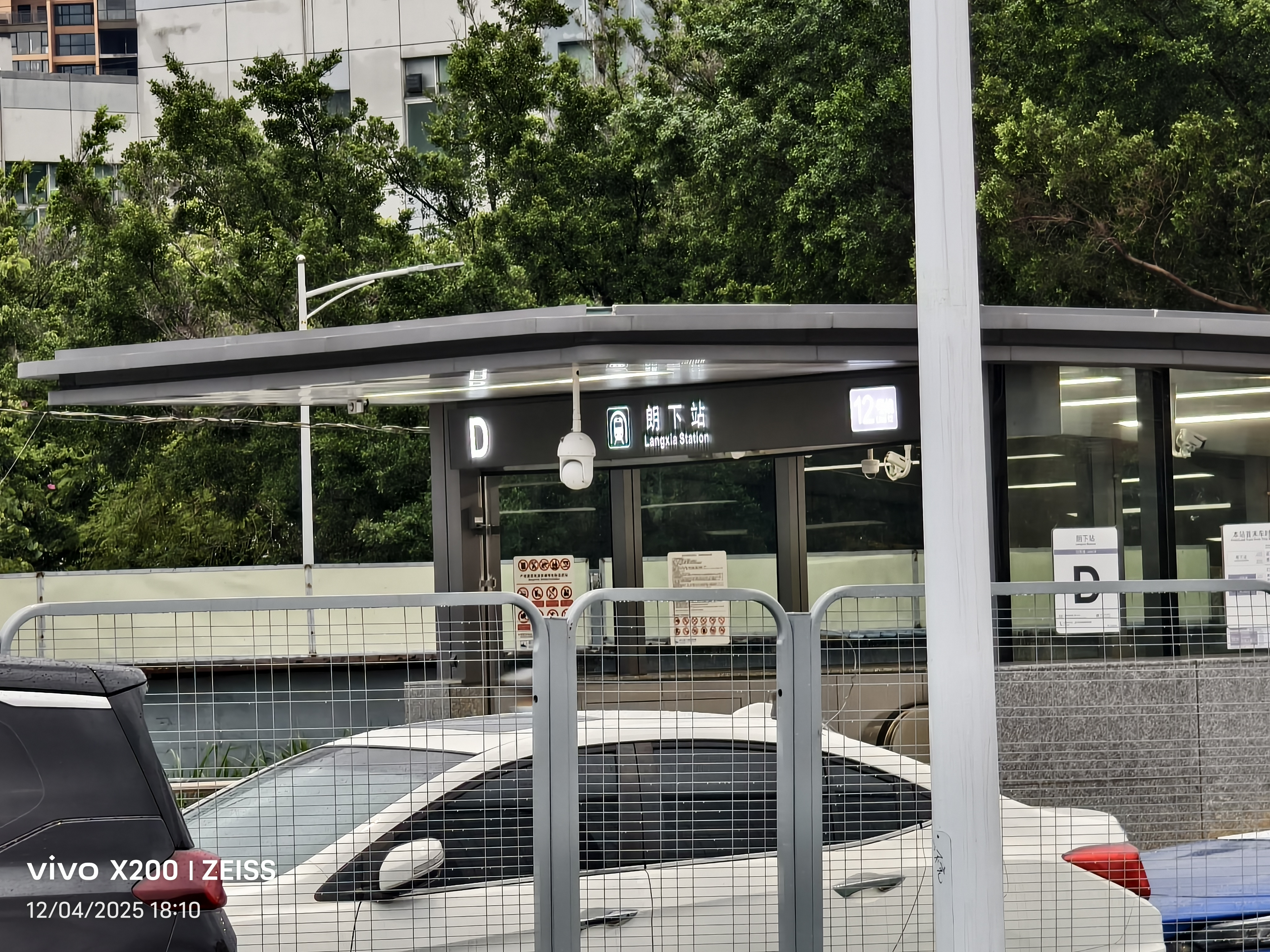
Entrance D
