= Waterlands Resort South station =

Shenzhen Metro Line 12 station

Waterlands Resort South 海上田园南
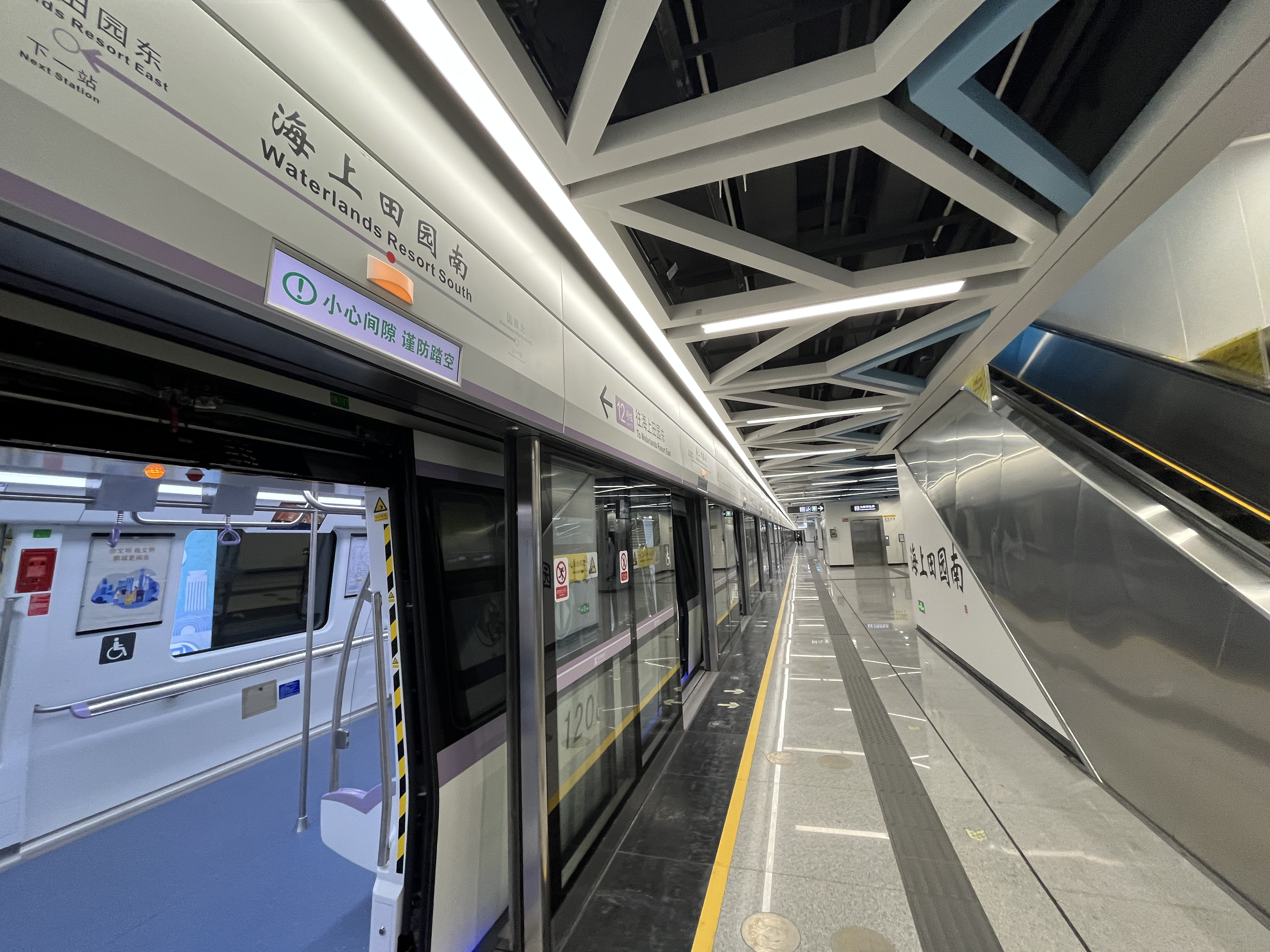
- Platform

Chinese name
- Traditional Chinese: 海上田園南
- Simplified Chinese: 海上田园南
Transcriptions
Standard Mandarin
- Hanyu Pinyin: Hǎishàng Tiányuán Nán
Yue: Cantonese
- Yale Romanization: Hóiseuhng Tìnyùhn Nàahm
- Jyutping: Hoi2 Seung6 Tin4 Jyun4 Naam4

General information
- Location: Intersection of Exhibition City Road and South Shajing Ring Road; Shajing Subdistrict, Bao'an District, Shenzhen, Guangdong; China
- Coordinates: 22°43′17.26″N 113°46′9.80″E
- Operated by: Shenzhen Line 12 Rail Transit Co., Ltd (Shenzhen Metro Group and PowerChina PPP)
- Line: Line 12
- Platforms: 2 (1 island platform)
- Tracks: 2

Construction
- Structure type: Underground
- Accessible: Yes

History
- Opened: 28 November 2022 (3 years ago)

Services
| Preceding station | Shenzhen Metro | Following station |
|---|---|---|
| Waterlands Resort East towards Songgang | Line 12 | Shenzhen World North towards Zuopaotai East |
Location

Waterlands Resort South station (simplified Chinese: 海上田园南; traditional Chinese: 海上田園南; pinyin: Hǎishàng Tiányuán Nán; Cantonese Yale: Hóiseuhng Tìnyùhn Nàahm) is a metro station on Line 12 of Shenzhen Metro. It opened on 28 November 2022.

== Station layout ==
The station has an island platform.

| G | – | Exits A & C |
| B1F; Concourse | Lobby | Ticket Machines, Customer Service, Station Control Room |
| B2F; Platforms | Platform | 12 towards Songgang (Waterlands Resort East) |
| B2F; Platforms | Island platform, doors will open on the left |
| B2F; Platforms | Platform | 12 towards Zuopaotai East (Shenzhen World North) |

=== Entrances/exits ===
The station has 2 points of entry/exit. Both are accessible via elevators.

| Exit | Destination |
|---|---|
| Exit A | Exhibition City Road (E), Exhibition Bay Yongjing Garden, Yunhaizhen Mansion |
| Exit C | South Shajing Ring Road (N), Shenzhen Qianhai Huafa Ice and Snow World, Waterlands Resort |
