= Shajing Ancient Market station =

Shenzhen Metro Line 12 station

Shajing Ancient Market 沙井古墟
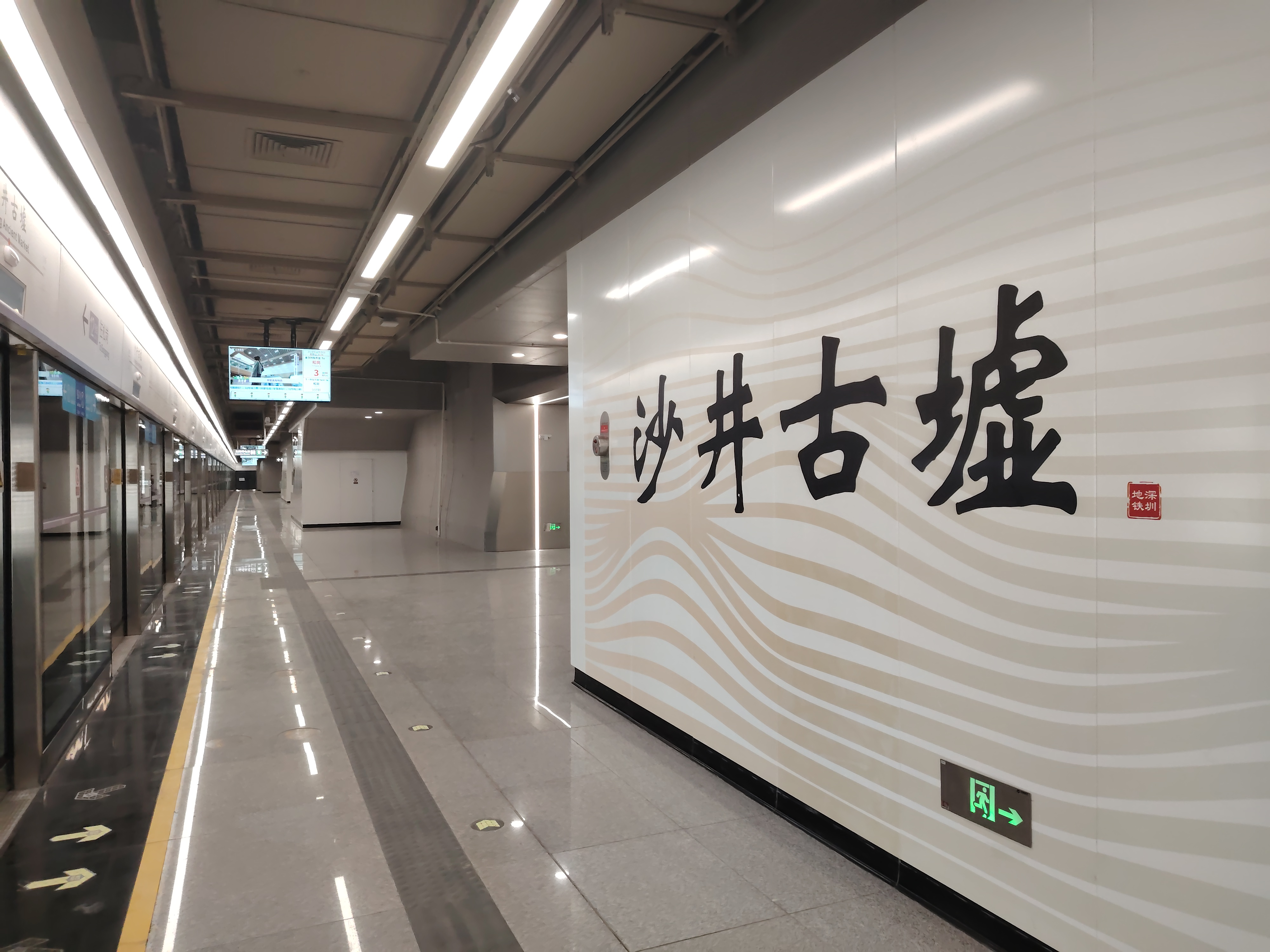
- Platform

Chinese name
- Chinese: 沙井古墟
Transcriptions
Standard Mandarin
- Hanyu Pinyin: Shājǐng Gǔxū
Yue: Cantonese
- Yale Romanization: Sāajéng Gúhēui
- Jyutping: Saa1zeng2 Gu2heoi1

General information
- Location: Intersection of Ditang Road (帝堂路) and Shajing Main Street (沙井大街); Shajing Subdistrict, Bao'an District, Shenzhen, Guangdong; China
- Coordinates: 22°44′49.60″N 113°48′11.88″E
- Operated by: Shenzhen Line 12 Rail Transit Co., Ltd (Shenzhen Metro Group and PowerChina PPP)
- Line: Line 12
- Platforms: 2 (1 island platform)
- Tracks: 2

Construction
- Structure type: Underground
- Accessible: Yes

History
- Opened: 28 December 2024 (17 months ago)
- Previous names: Shasan (沙三), Longjin (龙津)

Services
Preceding station	Shenzhen Metro	Following station
Buchong towards Songgang	Line 12	Shahao towards Zuopaotai East
Location

Shajing Ancient Market station (Chinese: 沙井古墟站; pinyin: Shājǐng Gǔxū Zhàn; Jyutping: Saa1 Zeng2 Gu2 Heoi1 Zaam6; Cantonese Yale: Sāajéng Gúhēui Jaahm) is a station on Line 12 of Shenzhen Metro. It opened on 28 December 2024, and is located in Shajing Subdistrict in Bao'an District.

== Station layout ==
G	-	Exits C & D
B1F; Concourse	Lobby	Ticket Machines, Customer Service, Vending Machines, Control Room
B2F; Platforms	Platform	12 towards Songgang (Buchong)
B2F; Platforms	Island platform, doors will open on the left
B2F; Platforms	Platform	12 towards Zuopaotai East (Shahao)

=== Entrances/exits ===
The station has 2 points of entry/exit, with Exit D being accessible via elevator.

- C: Shajing Main Street, Ditang Road
- D: Shajing Main Street, Ditang Road
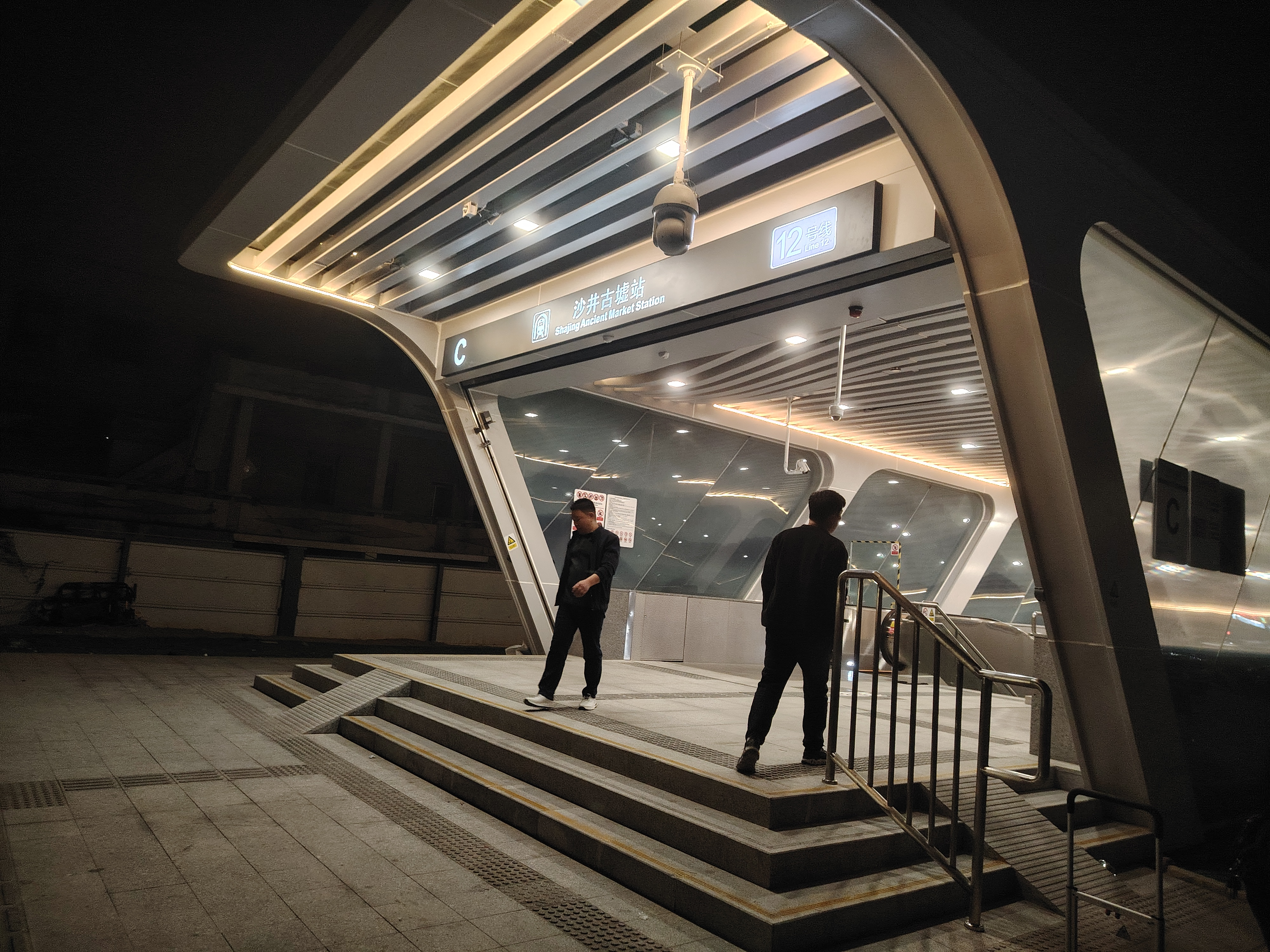
Entrance C

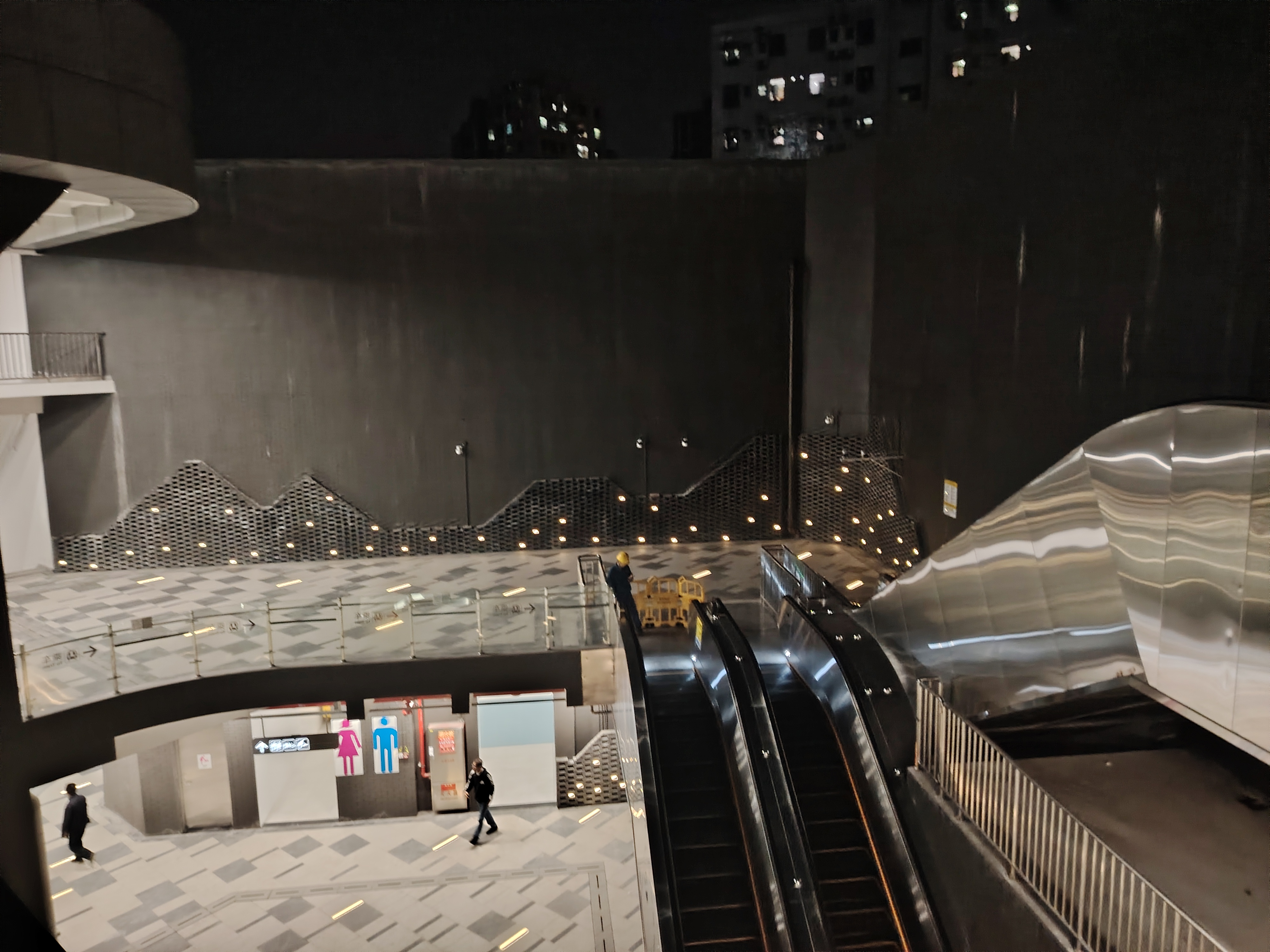
Entrance D

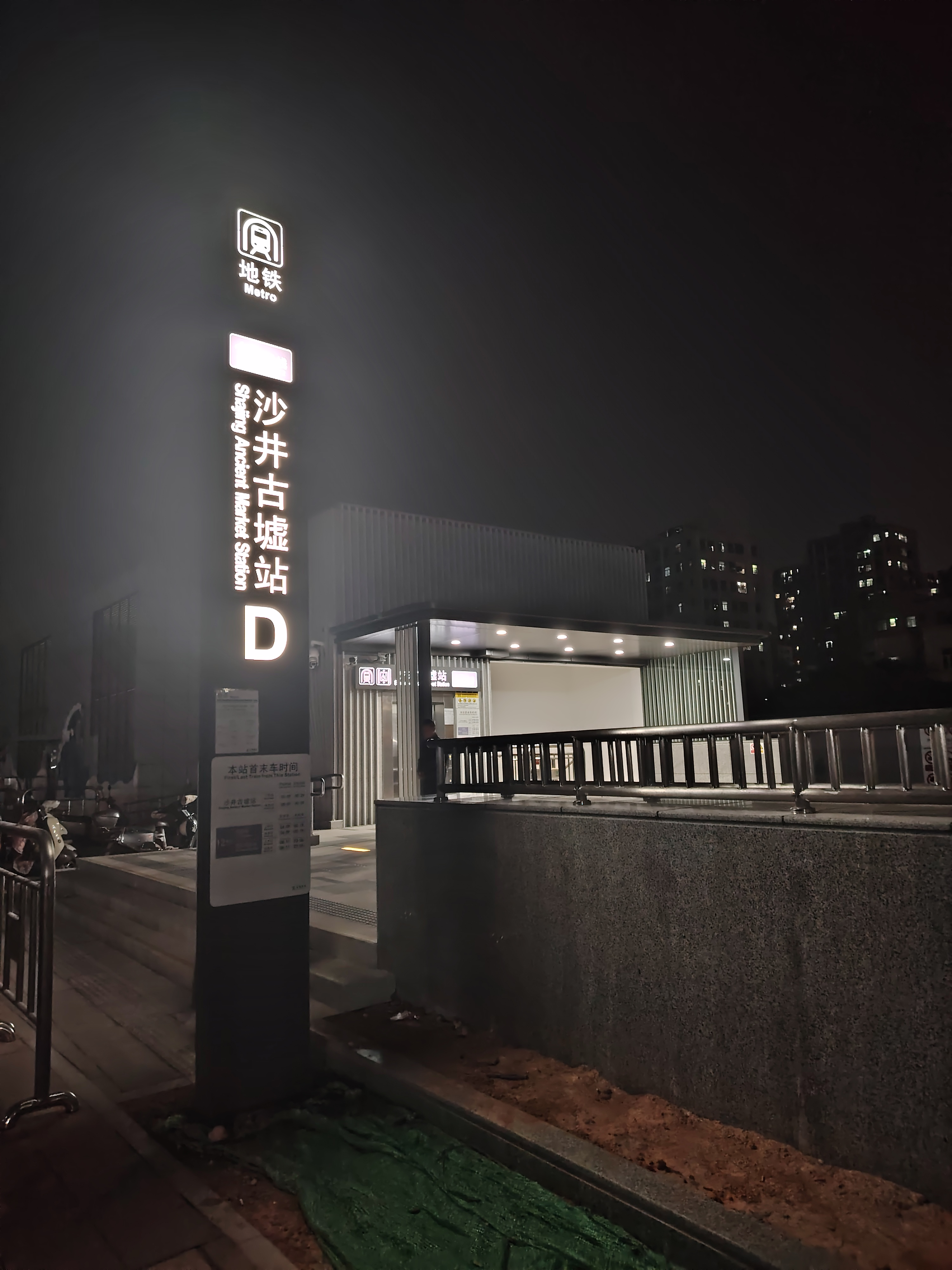
Entrance D Sign
