= Shahao station =

Shenzhen Metro Line 12 station

Shahao 沙蚝
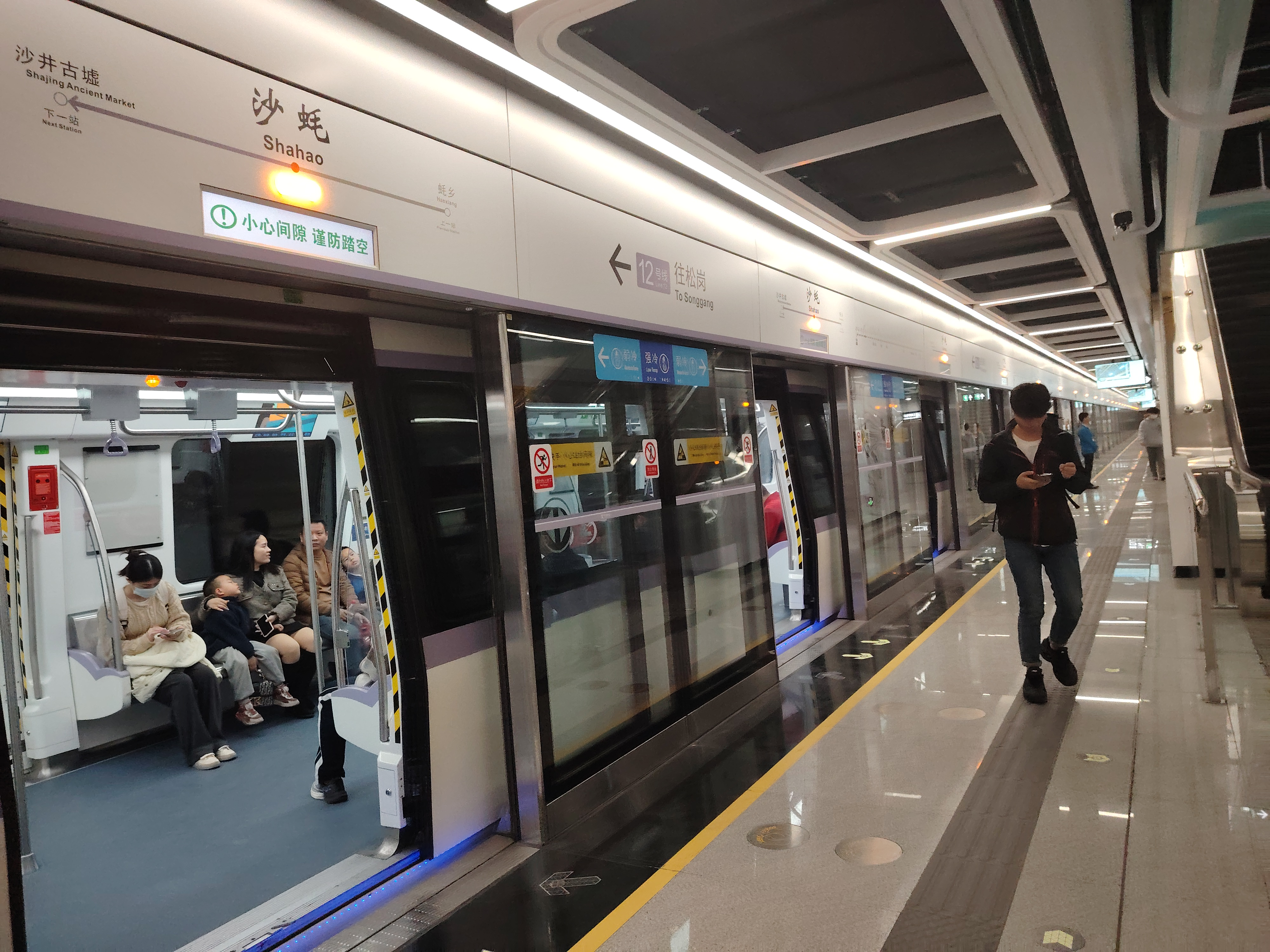
- Platform

Chinese name
- Simplified Chinese: 沙蚝
- Traditional Chinese: 沙蠔
Transcriptions
Standard Mandarin
- Hanyu Pinyin: Shāháo
Yue: Cantonese
- Yale Romanization: Sāahòuh
- Jyutping: Saa1hou4

General information
- Location: Intersection of Haoxiang Road (蚝乡路) and Shajing West Circular Road (沙井西环路); Shajing Subdistrict, Bao'an District, Shenzhen, Guangdong; China
- Coordinates: 22°44′33.29″N 113°47′47.69″E
- Operated by: Shenzhen Line 12 Rail Transit Co., Ltd (Shenzhen Metro Group and PowerChina PPP)
- Line: Line 12
- Platforms: 2 (1 island platform)
- Tracks: 2

Construction
- Structure type: Underground
- Accessible: Yes

History
- Opened: 28 December 2024 (17 months ago)
- Previous names: Xihuan Road (西环路)

Services
Preceding station	Shenzhen Metro	Following station
Shajing Ancient Market towards Songgang	Line 12	Haoxiang towards Zuopaotai East
Location

Shahao station (simplified Chinese: 沙蚝站; traditional Chinese: 沙蠔站; pinyin: Shāháo Zhàn; Jyutping: Saa1hou4 Zaam6; Cantonese Yale: Sāahòuh Jaahm) is a station on Line 12 of Shenzhen Metro. It opened on 28 December 2024, and is located in Shajing Subdistrict in Bao'an District.

== Station layout ==
G	-	Exits A-D
B1F; Concourse	Lobby	Ticket Machines, Customer Service, Vending Machines, Control Room
B2F; Platforms	Platform	12 towards Songgang (Shajing Ancient Market)
B2F; Platforms	Island platform, doors will open on the left
B2F; Platforms	Platform	12 towards Zuopaotai East (Haoxiang)

=== Entrances/exits ===
The station has 4 points of entry/exit, with Exits A and C being accessible via elevators. Exit B has a toilet.

- A: Haoxiang Road, Shajing West Circular Road
- B: Haoxiang Road, Shajing West Circular Road
- C: Haoxiang Road, Shajing West Circular Road
- D: Haoxiang Road, Shajing West Circular Road
