= Waterlands Resort East station =

Shenzhen Metro Line 12 station

Waterlands Resort East 海上田园东
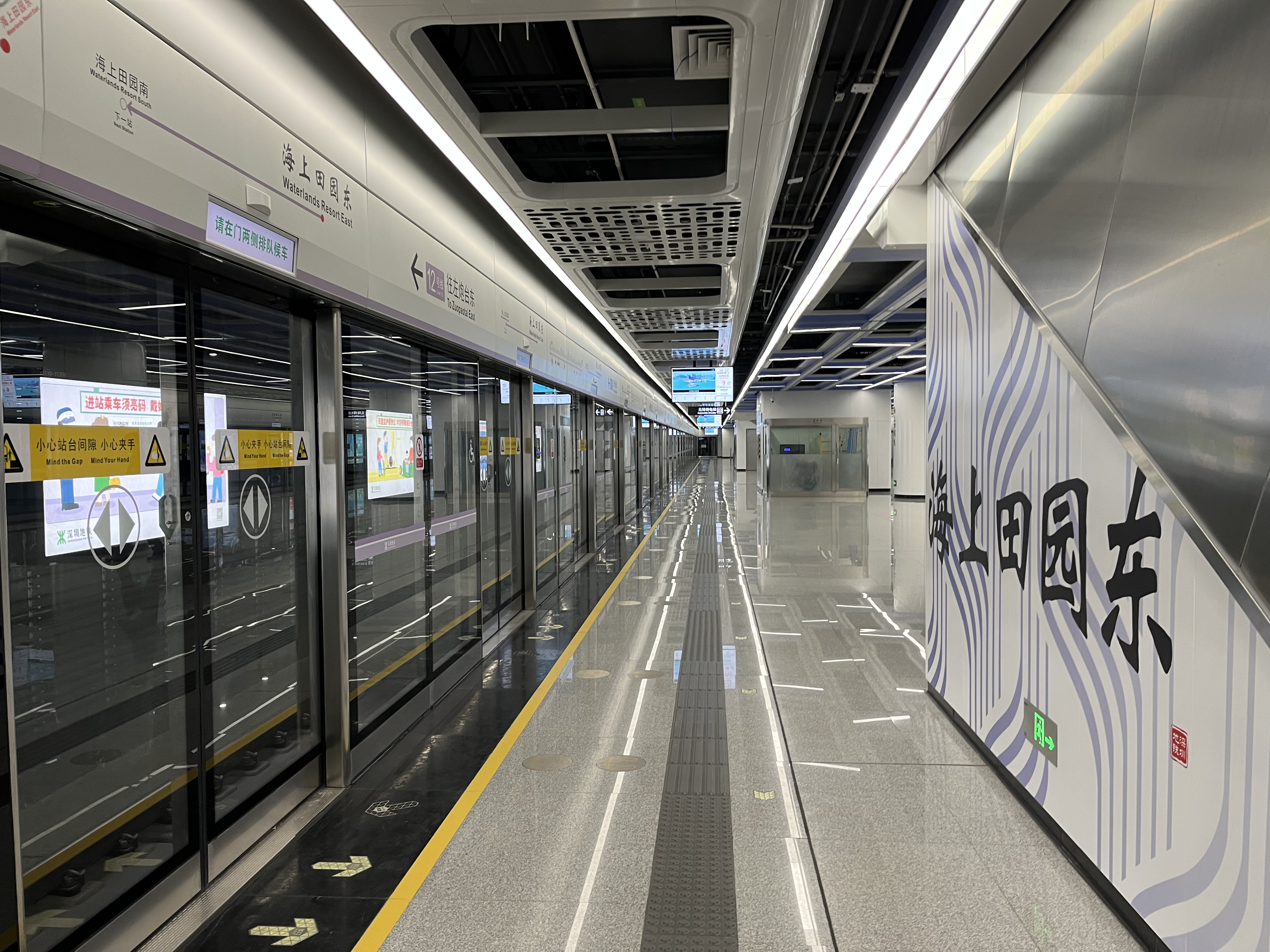
- Platform

Chinese name
- Traditional Chinese: 海上田園東
- Simplified Chinese: 海上田园东
Transcriptions
Standard Mandarin
- Hanyu Pinyin: Hǎishàng Tiányuán Dōng
Yue: Cantonese
- Yale Romanization: Hóiseuhng Tìnyùhn Dōng
- Jyutping: Hoi2 Seung6 Tin4 Jyun4 Dung1

General information
- Location: North of the intersection of Fengmin Road and Xinsha Road; Shajing Subdistrict, Bao'an District, Shenzhen, Guangdong; China
- Coordinates: 22°43′59″N 113°46′35″E
- Operated by: Shenzhen Line 12 Rail Transit Co., Ltd (Shenzhen Metro Group and PowerChina PPP)
- Line: Line 12
- Platforms: 2 (1 island platform)
- Tracks: 2

Construction
- Structure type: Underground
- Accessible: Yes

History
- Opened: 28 November 2022 (3 years ago)

Services
Preceding station	Shenzhen Metro	Following station
Haoxiang towards Songgang	Line 12	Waterlands Resort South towards Zuopaotai East
Location

Waterlands Resort East station (simplified Chinese: 海上田园东; traditional Chinese: 海上田園東; pinyin: Hǎishàng Tiányuán Dōng; Cantonese Yale: Hóiseuhng Tìnyùhn Dōng) is a metro station on Line 12 of Shenzhen Metro. It opened on 28 November 2022. It was the northern terminus of the line until the extension to Songgang opened on 28 December 2024.

== Station layout ==
The station has an island platform.

G	–	Exits A-D
B1F; Concourse	Lobby	Ticket Machines, Customer Service, Station Control Room
B2F; Platforms	Platform	12 towards Songgang (Haoxiang)
B2F; Platforms	Island platform, doors will open on the left
B2F; Platforms	Platform	12 towards Zuopaotai East (Waterlands Resort South)

=== Entrances/exits ===
The station has 4 points of entry/exit, with Exit B being accessible via elevator.

Exit	Destination
Exit A	Fengmin Road (E), Xinsha Road (N), Shenzhen No. 7 Senior High School, Oyster 2 - West Coast
Exit B	Fengmin Road (W), Minzhu Boulevard (S), Hangshi Science and Technology Park, Democracy New Village, Oyster 3 - Democratic Fengze Park, Waterlands Resort
Exit C	Fengmin Road (W), Xinsha Road (N)
Exit D	Fengmin Road (W), Xinsha Road (S)

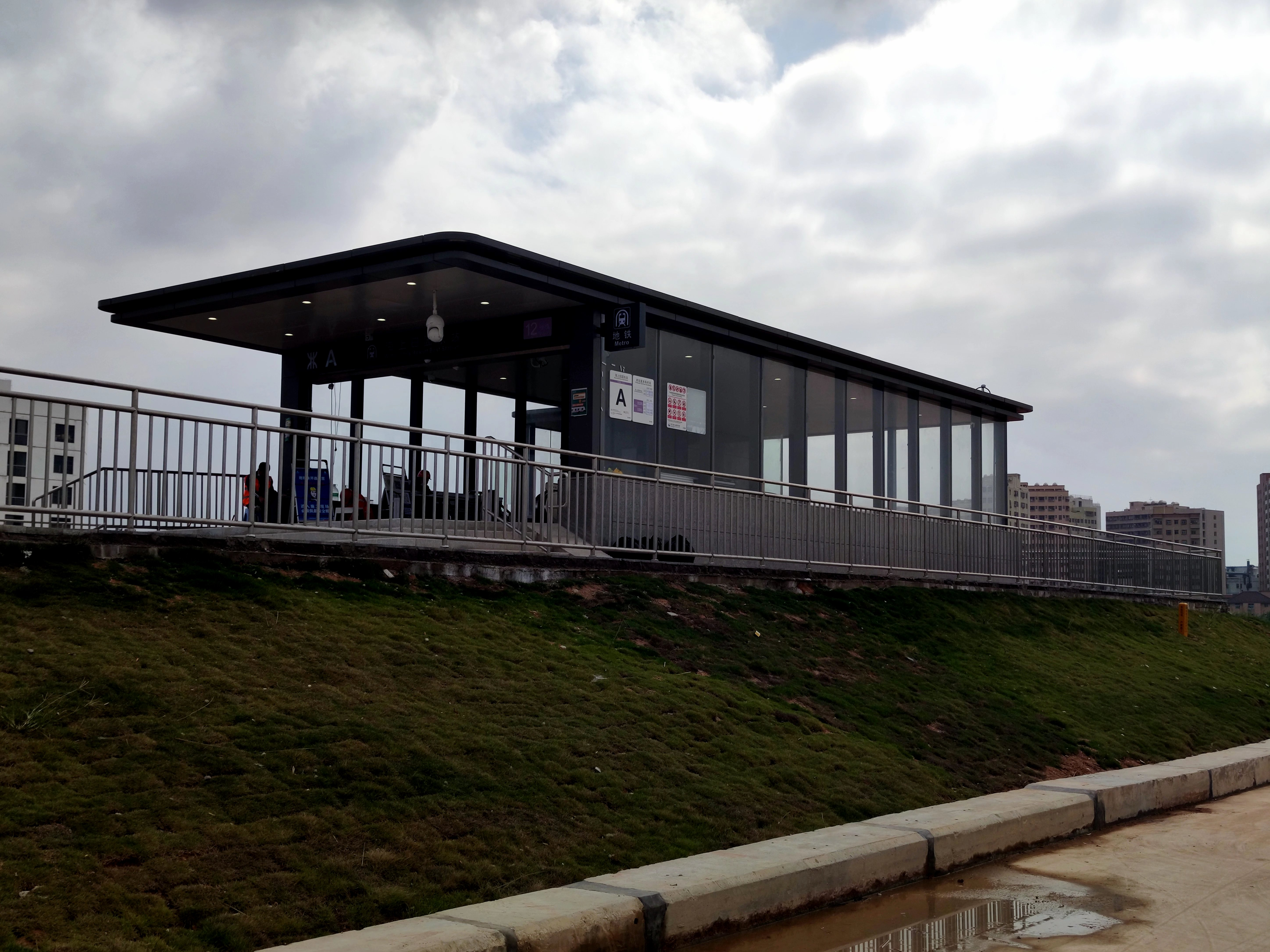
Entrance A

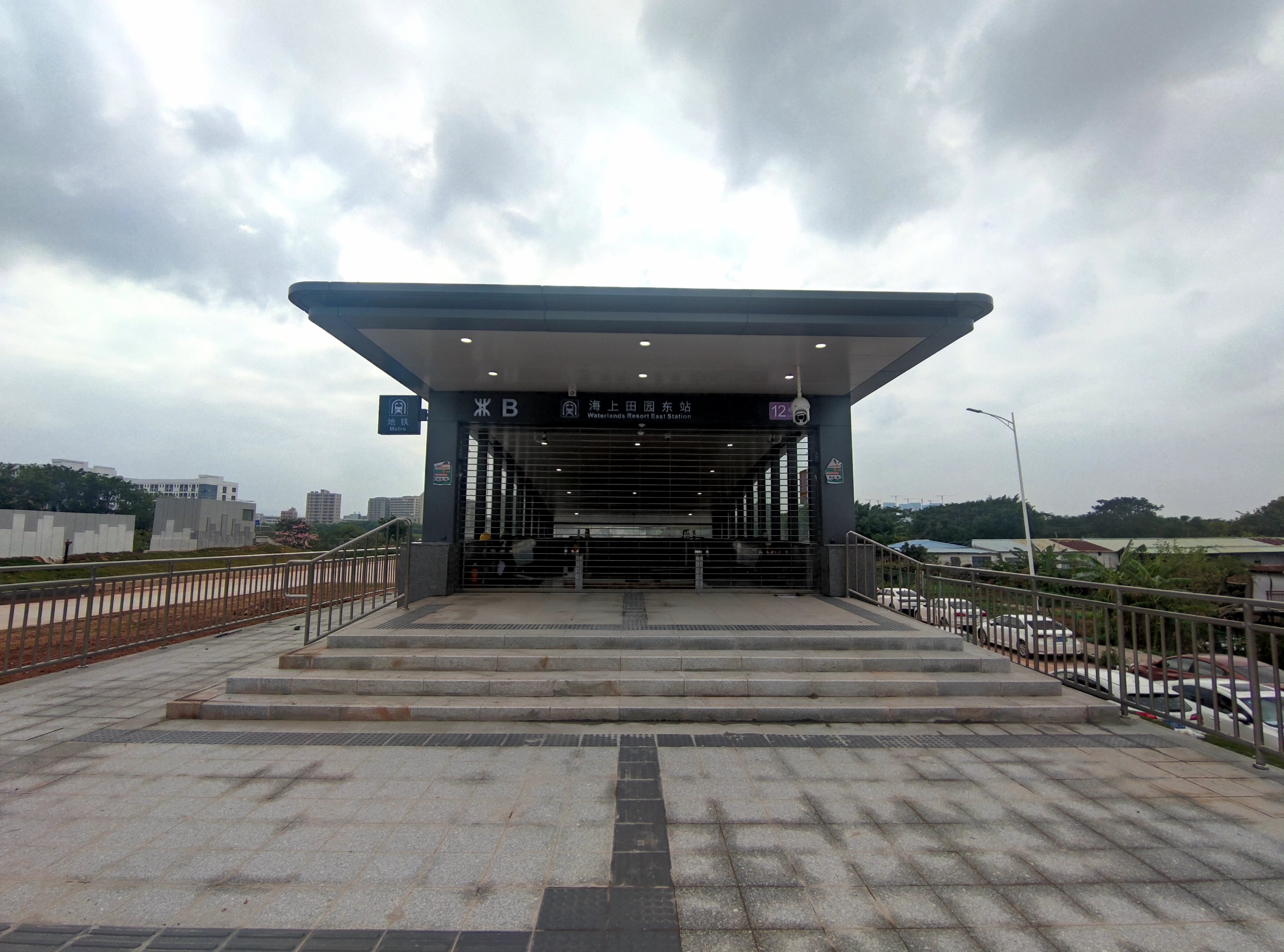
Entrance B

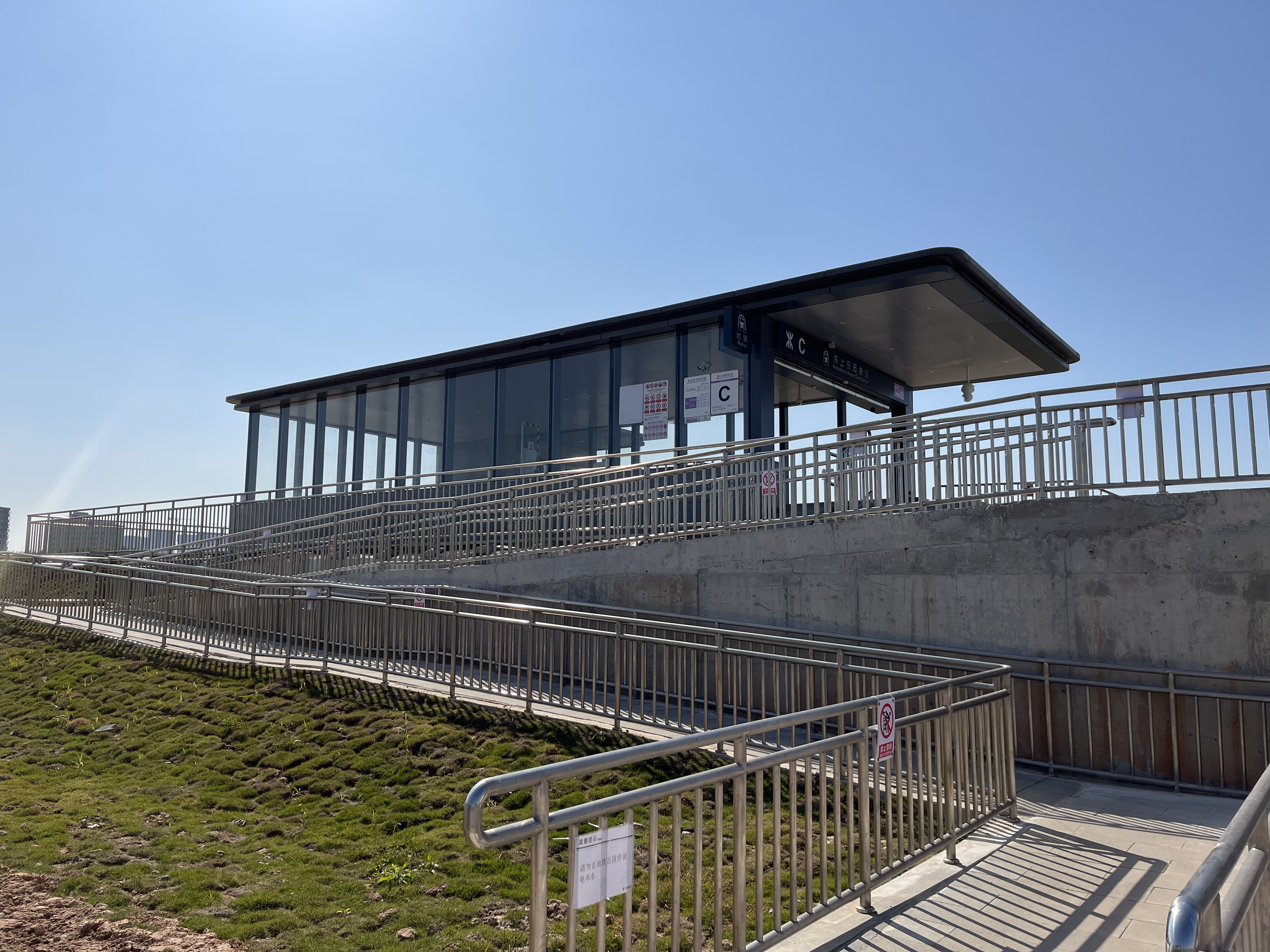
Entrance C

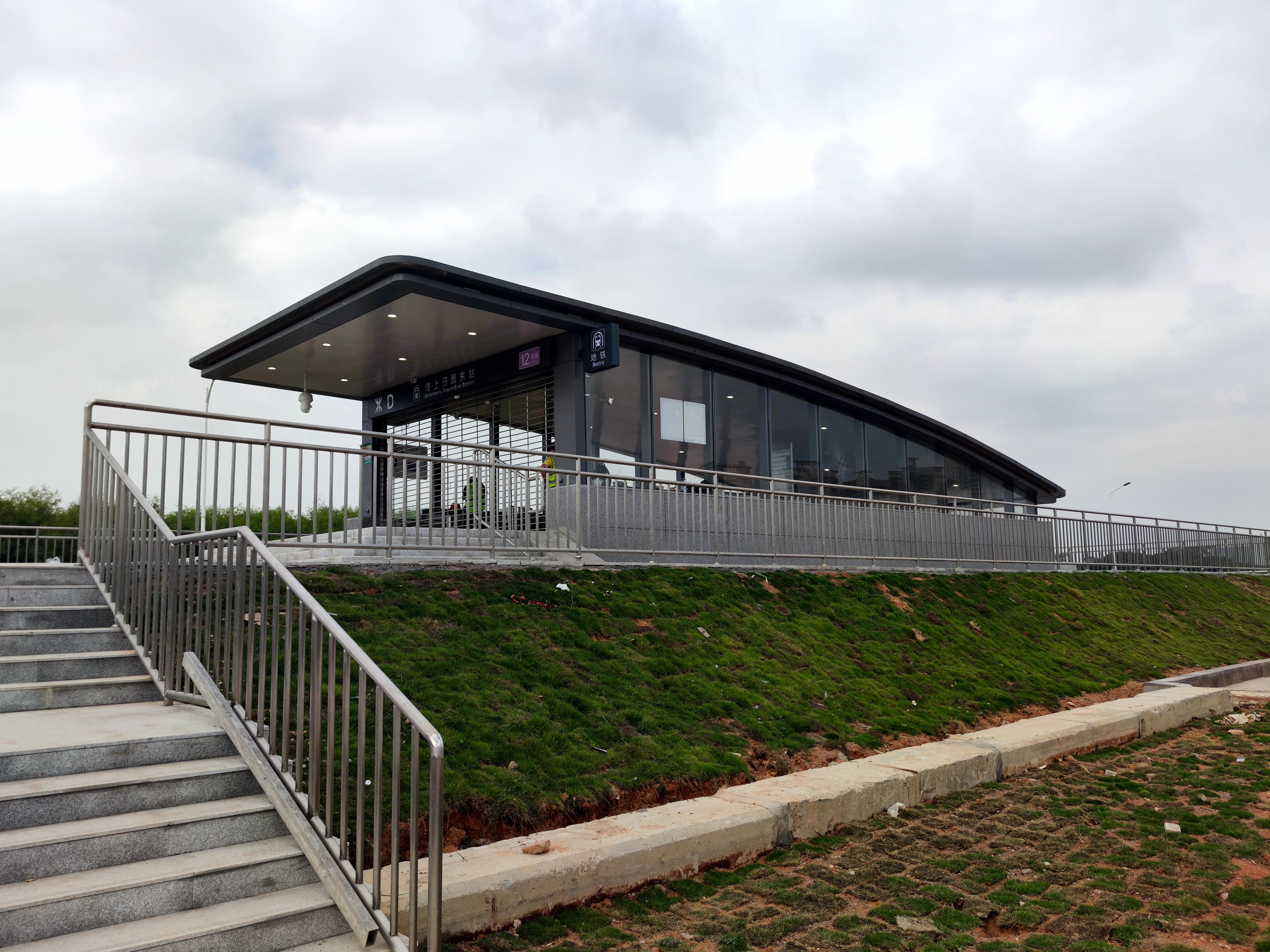
Entrance D
