= Buchong station =

Shenzhen Metro Line 12 station

Buchong 步涌
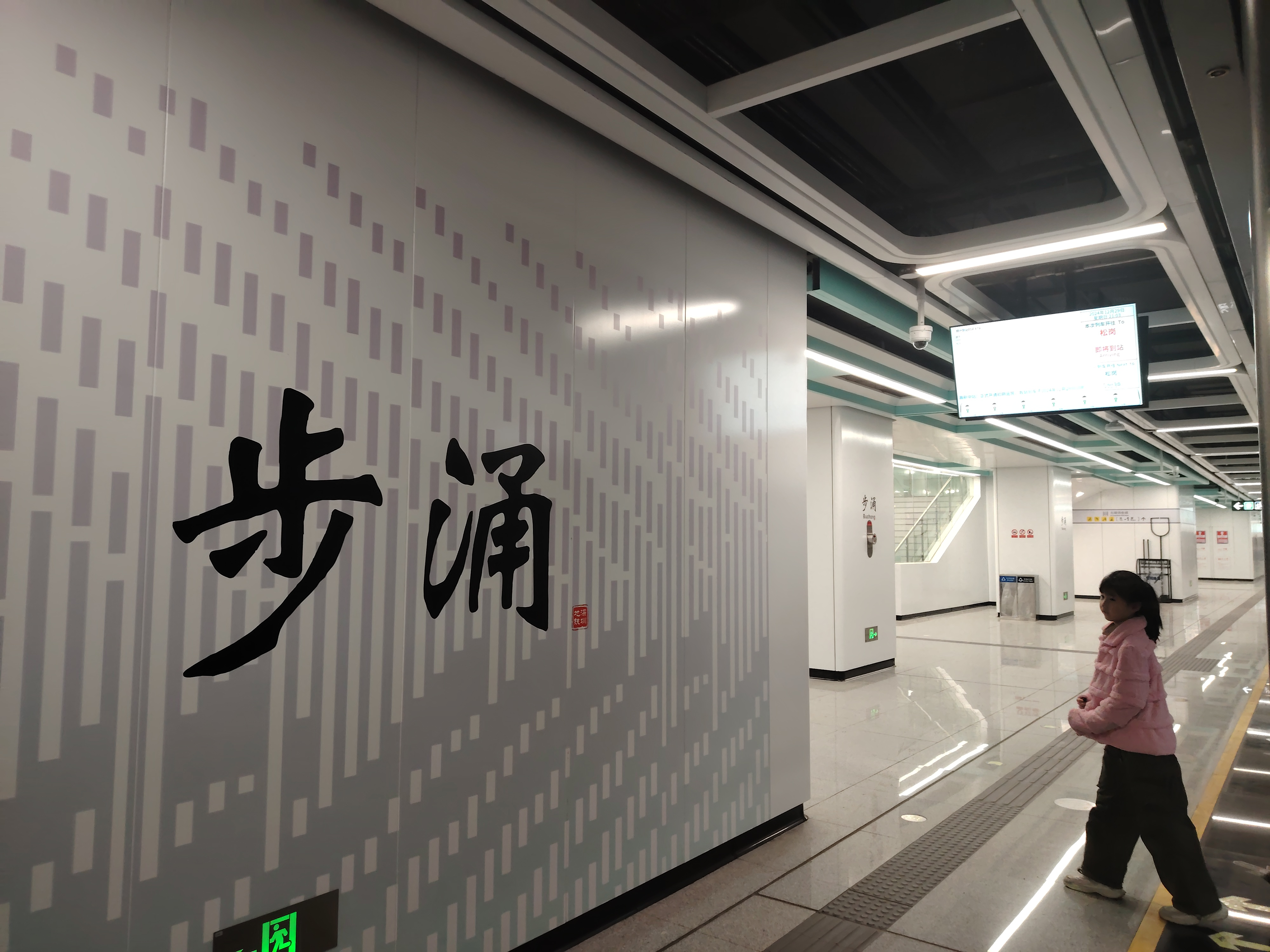
- Platform

Chinese name
- Chinese: 步涌
Transcriptions
Standard Mandarin
- Hanyu Pinyin: Bùchōng
Yue: Cantonese
- Yale Romanization: Bouchūng
- Jyutping: Bou6cung1

General information
- Location: Intersection of Shajing Road (沙井路) and Xinhe Avenue (新和大道); Shajing Subdistrict, Bao'an District, Shenzhen, Guangdong; China
- Coordinates: 22°45′39.820″N 113°48′26.852″E
- Operated by: Shenzhen Line 12 Rail Transit Co., Ltd (Shenzhen Metro Group and PowerChina PPP)
- Line: Line 12
- Platforms: 2 (1 island platform)
- Tracks: 2

Construction
- Structure type: Underground
- Accessible: Yes

History
- Opened: 28 December 2024 (17 months ago)

Services
Preceding station	Shenzhen Metro	Following station
Langxia towards Songgang	Line 12	Shajing Ancient Market towards Zuopaotai East
Location

Buchong station (Chinese: 步涌站; pinyin: Bùchōng Zhàn; Jyutping: Bou6cung1 Zaam6; Cantonese Yale: Bouchūng Jaahm) is a station on Line 12 of Shenzhen Metro. It opened on 28 December 2024, and is located in Shajing Subdistrict in Bao'an District.

== Station layout ==
G	-	Exits A-D
B1F; Concourse	Lobby	Ticket Machines, Customer Service, Vending Machines, Control Room
B2F; Platforms	Platform	12 towards Songgang (Langxia)
B2F; Platforms	Island platform, doors will open on the left
B2F; Platforms	Platform	12 towards Zuopaotai East (Shajing Ancient Market)

=== Entrances/exits ===
The station has 4 points of entry/exit, with Exits B and C being accessible via elevators. Exit B has a toilet.

- A: Xinhe Avenue
- B: Xinhe Avenue, Gonghe Second Industrial Zone
- C: Shajing Road
- D: Shajing Road, Shajing West Circular Road
