= Haoxiang station =

Shenzhen Metro Line 12 station

Haoxiang 蚝乡
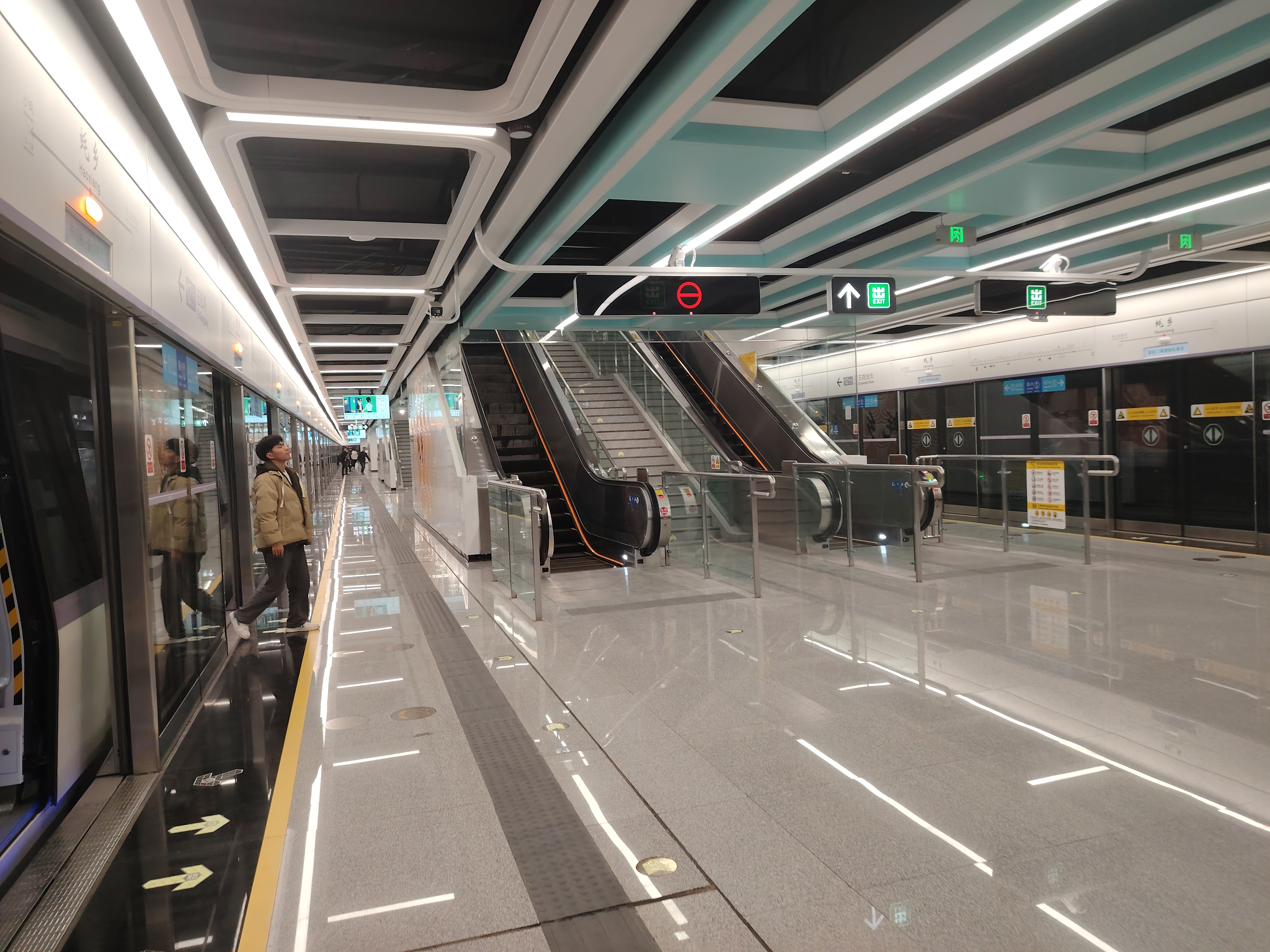
- Platform

Chinese name
- Simplified Chinese: 蚝乡
- Traditional Chinese: 蠔鄉
Transcriptions
Standard Mandarin
- Hanyu Pinyin: Háoxiāng
Yue: Cantonese
- Yale Romanization: Hòuh Hēung
- Jyutping: Hou4hoeng1

General information
- Location: Intersection of Haoxiang Road (蚝乡路) and Xisha Road (西沙路); Shajing Subdistrict, Bao'an District, Shenzhen, Guangdong; China
- Coordinates: 22°44′36.71″N 113°47′5.50″E
- Operated by: Shenzhen Line 12 Rail Transit Co., Ltd (Shenzhen Metro Group and PowerChina PPP)
- Line: Line 12
- Platforms: 2 (1 island platform)
- Tracks: 2

Construction
- Structure type: Underground
- Accessible: Yes

History
- Opened: 28 December 2024 (17 months ago)

Services
| Preceding station | Shenzhen Metro | Following station |
|---|---|---|
| Shahao towards Songgang | Line 12 | Waterlands Resort East towards Zuopaotai East |
Location

Haoxiang station (simplified Chinese: 蚝乡站; traditional Chinese: 蠔鄉站; pinyin: Háoxiāng Zhàn; Jyutping: Hou4hoeng1 Zaam6; Cantonese Yale: Hòuh Hēung Jaahm) is a station on Line 12 of Shenzhen Metro. It opened on 28 December 2024, and is located in Shajing Subdistrict in Bao'an District.

== Station layout ==
| G | - | Exits A-D |
| B1F; Concourse | Lobby | Ticket Machines, Customer Service, Vending Machines, Control Room |
| B2F; Platforms | Platform | 12 towards Songgang (Shahao) |
| B2F; Platforms | Island platform, doors will open on the left |
| B2F; Platforms | Platform | 12 towards Zuopaotai East (Waterlands Resort East) |

=== Entrances/exits ===
The station has 4 points of entry/exit, with Exits A and C being accessible via elevators. Exit B has a toilet.

- A: Haoxiang Road, Xisha Road
- B: Haoxiang Road, Xisha Road, Shajing West railway station
- C: Haoxiang Road, Xisha Road
- D: Haoxiang Road, Xisha Road
