= Zhenmei station =

Metro station in Shenzhen, China

Zhenmei 圳美
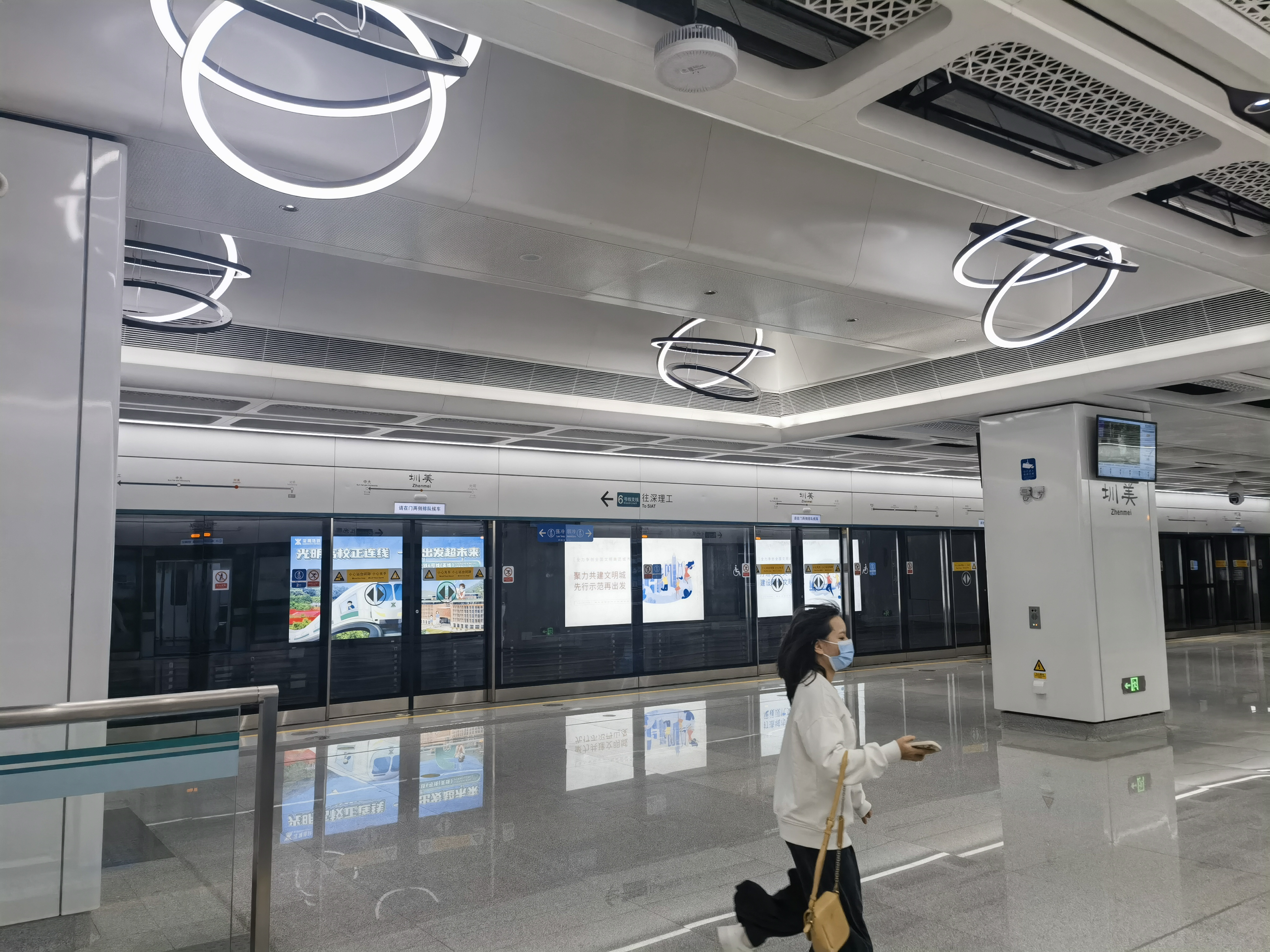
- Platform

General information
- Location: Guangming District, Shenzhen, Guangdong; China
- Coordinates: 22°32′58″N 114°7′22″E
- Operated by: SZMC (Shenzhen Metro Group)
- Line(s): Line 6 Branch
- Platforms: 2 (1 island platform)
- Tracks: 2

Construction
- Structure type: Underground
- Accessible: Yes

History
- Opened: 28 November 2022

Services
| Preceding station | Shenzhen Metro | Following station |
|---|---|---|
| Sun Yat-sen University towards SUAT | Line 6 Branch | Guangming towards Guangmingcheng |
Location

Zhenmei station (Chinese: 圳美站; pinyin: Zhènměi Zhàn), is a station on Line 6 Branch of the Shenzhen Metro. It opened on 28 November 2022.

== Station layout ==
| G | - | Exit |
| B1F; Concourse | Lobby | Customer Service, Shops, Vending machines, ATMs |
| B2F; Platforms | Platform | 6B towards Guangmingcheng (Guangming) |
| B2F; Platforms | Island platform, doors will open on the left |
| B2F; Platforms | Platform | 6B towards SUAT (Sun Yat-sen University) |

== Exits ==
| Exit | Destination |
