= Guangming station =

Metro station in Shenzhen, Guangdong, China

Guangming 光明
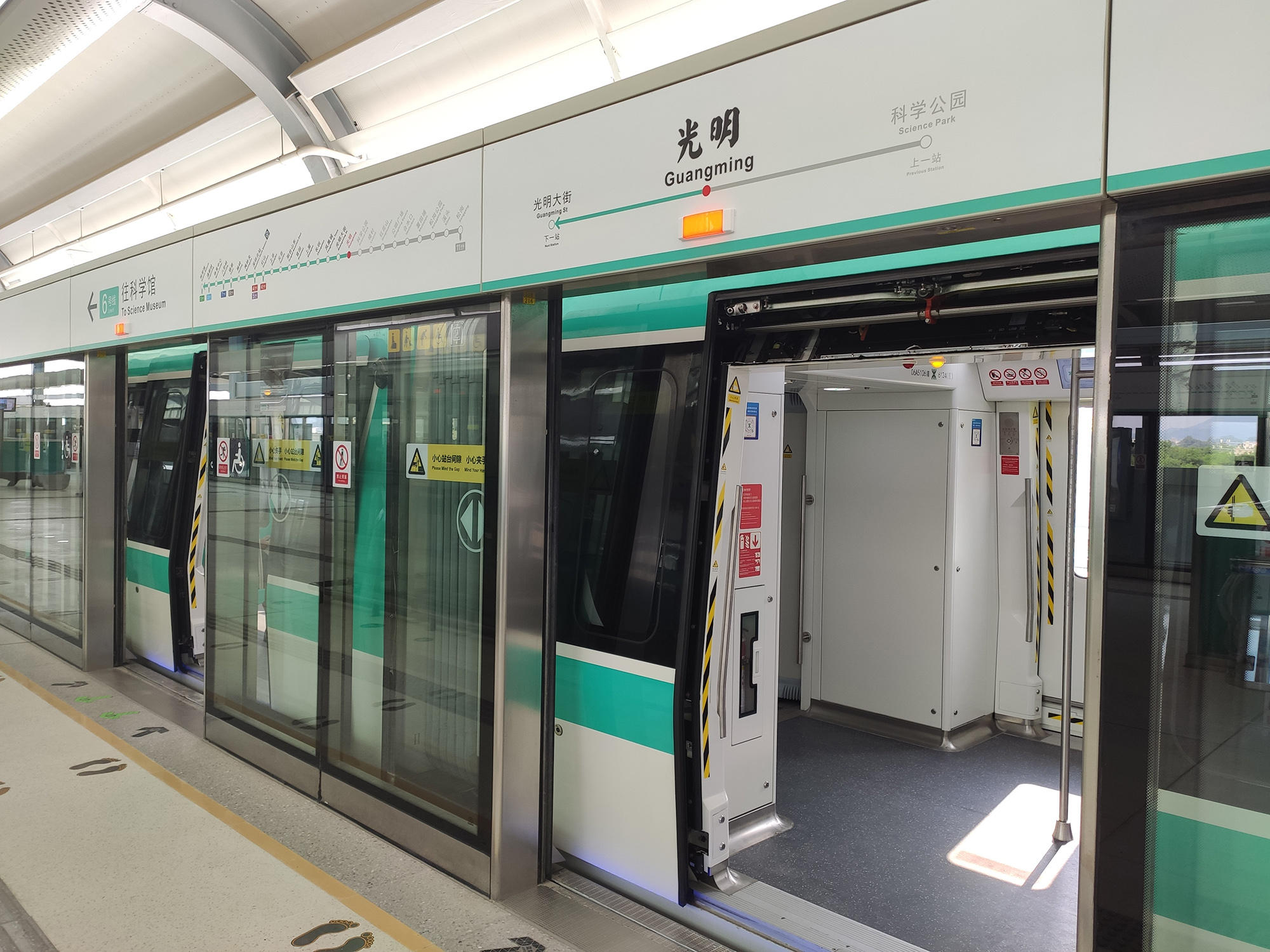
- Line 6 platform

General information
- Location: Guangming District, Shenzhen, Guangdong; China
- Coordinates: 22°32′58″N 114°7′22″E
- Operated by: SZMC (Shenzhen Metro Group)
- Lines: Line 6; Line 6 Branch
- Platforms: 4 (2 island platforms)
- Tracks: 4

Construction
- Structure type: Elevated
- Accessible: Yes

History
- Opened: 18 August 2020 (Line 6); 28 November 2022 (Line 6 Branch)

Services
Preceding station	Shenzhen Metro	Following station
Science Park towards Songgang	Line 6	Guangming Street towards Science Museum
Zhenmei towards SUAT	Line 6 Branch	Biyan towards Guangmingcheng
Location

Guangming station (Chinese: 光明站; pinyin: Guāngmíng zhàn) is a station of Line 6 and Line 6 Branch of the Shenzhen Metro. Line 6 platforms opened on 18 August 2020 and Line 6 Branch platforms opened on 28 November 2022. It was the southern terminus of Line 6 Branch until it was extended to Guangmingcheng on 28 September 2025.

== Station layout ==
3F; Platforms		6 towards Songgang (Science Park)
3F; Platforms	Island platform, doors will open on the left
3F; Platforms		6 towards Science Museum (Guangming Street)
3F; Platforms		6B towards Guangmingcheng (Biyan)
3F; Platforms	Island platform, doors will open on the left
3F; Platforms		6B towards SUAT (Zhenmei)
2F; Concourse	Lobby	Customer Service, Shops, Vending machines, ATMs
G	-	Exit

== Exits ==
Exit	Destination
Exit A	Xinjianxing Science and Technology Park, Cuihu Park
Exit C	Shenzhen Second Vocational and Technical School
Exit D	
