= Zhongshan Station =

Zhongshan Station may refer to:

- Zhongshan railway station in Guangdong, China
- Zhongshan metro station, on the Taipei Metro, Taiwan
- Zhongshan Station (Antarctica), a Chinese research base

== See also ==
- Nakayama Station (disambiguation)
- Sun Yat-sen Memorial Hall Station (disambiguation)
- Sun Yat-sen University station (disambiguation)
- Zhongshan Elementary School metro station, on the Taipei Metro, Taiwan
- Zhongshan Junior High School metro station, on the Taipei Metro, Taiwan
- Zhongshan Park Station (disambiguation)
- Zhongshan (disambiguation)
