= 中山 =

中山 is an East Asian name composed of two characters which collectively mean "central mountain". 中山 may refer to:

- Chūzan (中山王国), one of the three kingdoms that controlled Okinawa in the 14th century

== People with the given name ==
- Sun Yat-sen (孫中山 Sūn Zhōngshān, 1866–1925), Chinese revolutionary and political leader

== See also ==
- Chung Shan (disambiguation), the Chinese Wade–Giles transliteration
- Nakayama (disambiguation), the Japanese transliteration
- Zhongshan (disambiguation), the Chinese pinyin transliteration
