= Nakayama Station =

Nakayama Station may refer to either of the following railway stations in Japan:

- Nakayama Station (Kanagawa), on the Yokohama Line and the Yokohama Subway Green Line
- Nakayama Station (Kochi), on the Tosa Electric Railway Ino Line
- Baraki-Nakayama Station, on the Tokyo Metro Tozai Line
- Iyo-Nakayama Station, on the Yosan Line
- Keisei Nakayama Station, on the Keisei Main Line
- Shimousa-Nakayama Station, on the Sobu Main Line
- Uzen-Nakayama Station, on the Ou Line

It may also refer to:

- Nakayama-kannon Station, on the Hankyu Takarazuka Line (formerly named Nakayama Station)
- Nakayamadera Station, on the Fukuchiyama Line (formerly named Nakayama Station)

== See also ==
- Zhongshan Station (disambiguation)
- Zhongshan Park Station (disambiguation)
- Zhongshan (disambiguation)
