= Line 6 Branch (Shenzhen Metro) =

Metro line in Shenzhen, Guangdong, China

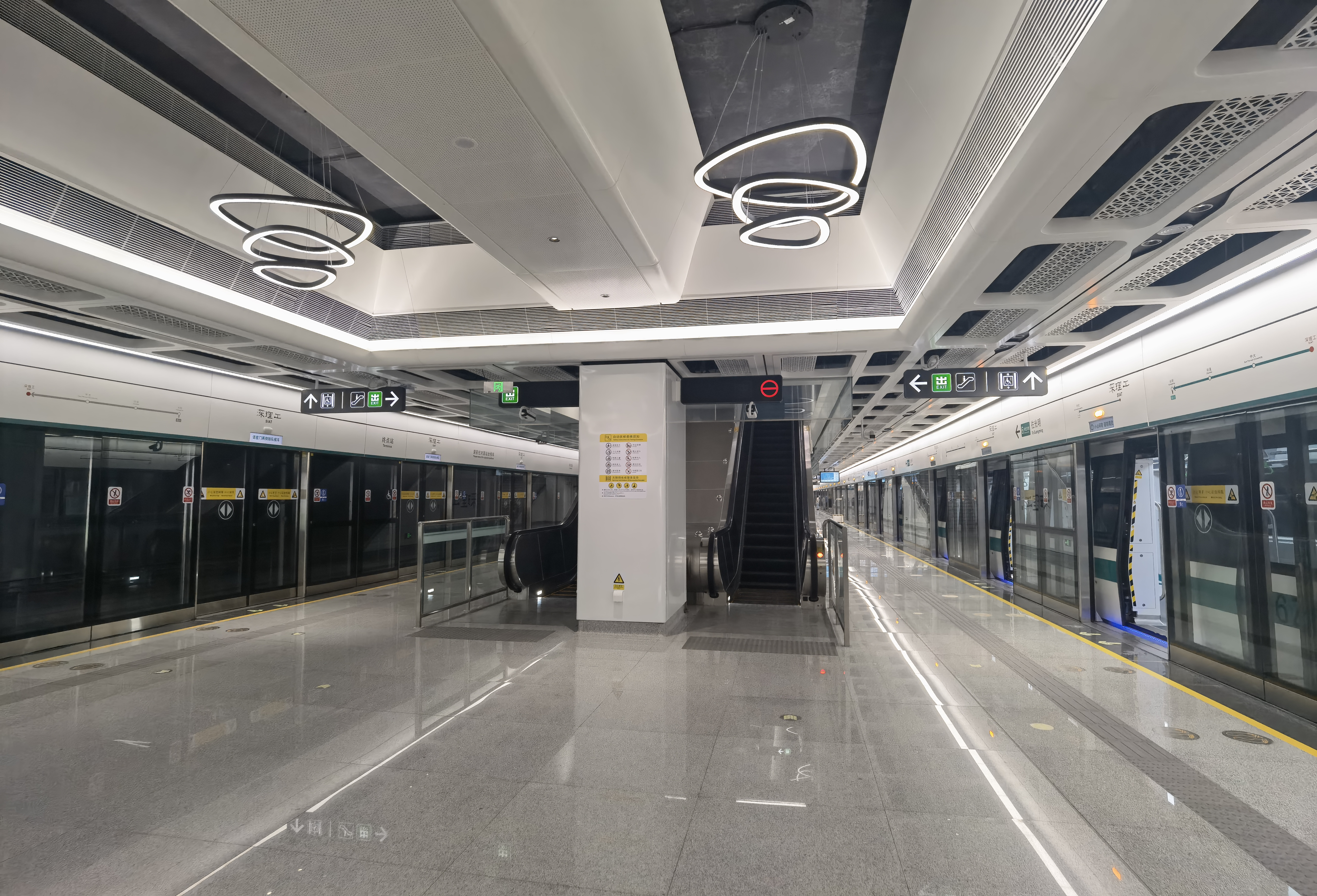
- SIAT station

Overview
- Status: Operational
- Locale: Shenzhen, Guangdong, China
- Termini: SIAT; Guangmingcheng
- Stations: 7
- Color on map: Turquoise blue (#037776)

Service
- Type: Rapid transit
- System: Shenzhen Metro
- Operator: SZMC (Shenzhen Metro Group)
- Depot: Changzhen Depot (Phase 1, before Phase 2 open)

History
- Opened: 28 November 2022; 3 years ago

Technical
- Line length: 11.07 km (6.9 mi)
- Number of tracks: 2
- Character: Underground and elevated
- Track gauge: 1,435 mm (4 ft 8 1/2 in) standard gauge
- Electrification: 1,500 V DC overhead lines
- Operating speed: 120 km/h (75 mph)
- Signalling: CBTC Moving block

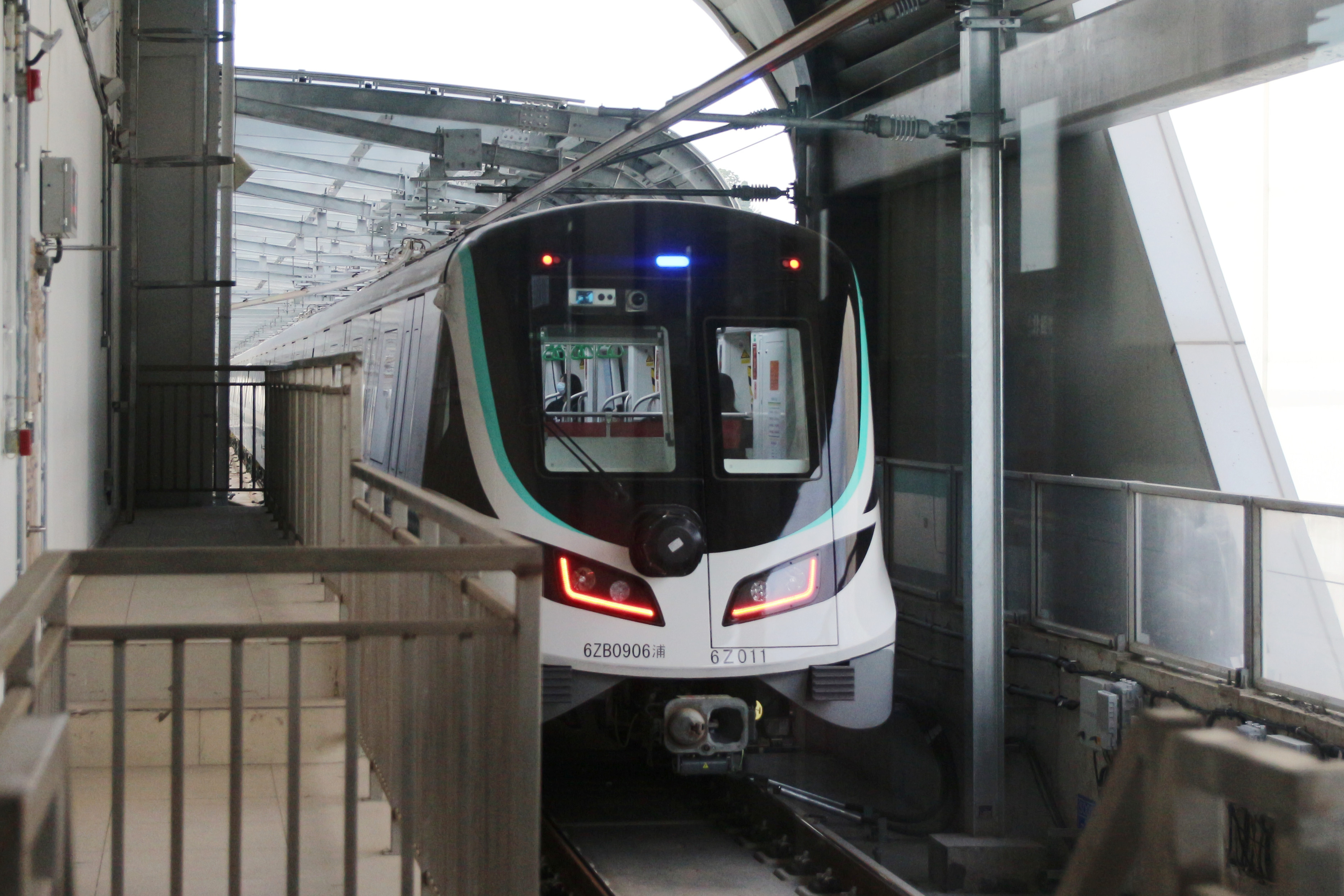
Line 6 Branch train

Line 6 Branch (simplified Chinese: 六号线支线; traditional Chinese: 六號線支線; pinyin: Liùhào Xiàn Zhīxiàn) of the Shenzhen Metro, also known as Branch Line 6, is a metro line in Shenzhen. Despite being nominally the branch of Line 6, it is actually a separate line, whose color, train type and train numbers are all different from those of the main line of Line 6.

== Sections ==
=== Phase 1 ===
Phase 1 of Line 6 Branch has a length of 6.13 km (3.81 mi) with four stations, from SIAT to Guangming. Phase 1 from Shenzhen Institute of Advanced Technology to Guangming opened on 28 November 2022.

=== Phase 2 ===
Phase 2 has a length of 4.9 km (3.0 mi) with three more stations, from Guangming to Guangmingcheng. Phase 2 from Guangming to Guangmingcheng opened on 28 September 2025.

=== Northern extension ===
A reserved northern extension from SIAT, currently under planning and not submitted to National Development and Reform Commission, will connect Line 6 Branch with Dongguan Rail Transit Line 1.

== Stations ==
Station name		Connections	Nearby bus stops	Distance km	Location
English	Chinese	Connections	Nearby bus stops	Distance km	Location
SUAT	深理工		Dongguan 747（莞747）		Guangming
Sun Yat-sen University	中大		M356 Dongguan 747（莞747）		Guangming
Zhenmei	圳美		325 B901 E3 M356 M411 M490 M596 Peak-time 149（高峰149）Dongguan 747（莞747）		Guangming
Guangming	光明	6			Guangming
Biyan	碧眼				Guangming
Hongqiao Park	虹桥公园				Guangming
Guangmingcheng	光明城	13 IMQ			Guangming
