= International Journal of Biological Sciences =

- Discipline: Life sciences
- Language: English
- Edited by: Chuxia Deng

Publication details
- History: 2005-present
- Publisher: Ivyspring International Publisher
- Frequency: 10/year
- Open access: Yes
- Impact factor: 9.2 (2022)

Standard abbreviations
- ISO 4: Int. J. Biol. Sci.

Indexing
- CODEN: IJBSB9
- ISSN: 1449-2288
- OCLC no.: 57564437

Links
- Journal homepage; Online access; Online archive

The International Journal of Biological Sciences is a peer-reviewed open access scientific journal published by Ivyspring International Publisher. It publishes original articles, reviews, and short research communications in all areas of biological sciences. The editor-in-chief is Chuxia Deng (Shenzhen University of Advanced Technology).

== Abstracting and indexing ==
The journal is abstracted and indexed in MEDLINE/PubMed, Science Citation Index Expanded, Current Contents/Life Sciences, Current Contents/Clinical Medicine, Biological Abstracts, BIOSIS Previews, The Zoological Record, EMBASE, Chemical Abstracts, CAB International, and Scopus. According to the Journal Citation Reports, the journal has a 2022 impact factor of 9.2.
