= Sun Yat-sen University station (Shenzhen Metro) =

Metro station in Shenzhen, China

Sun Yat-sen University 中大
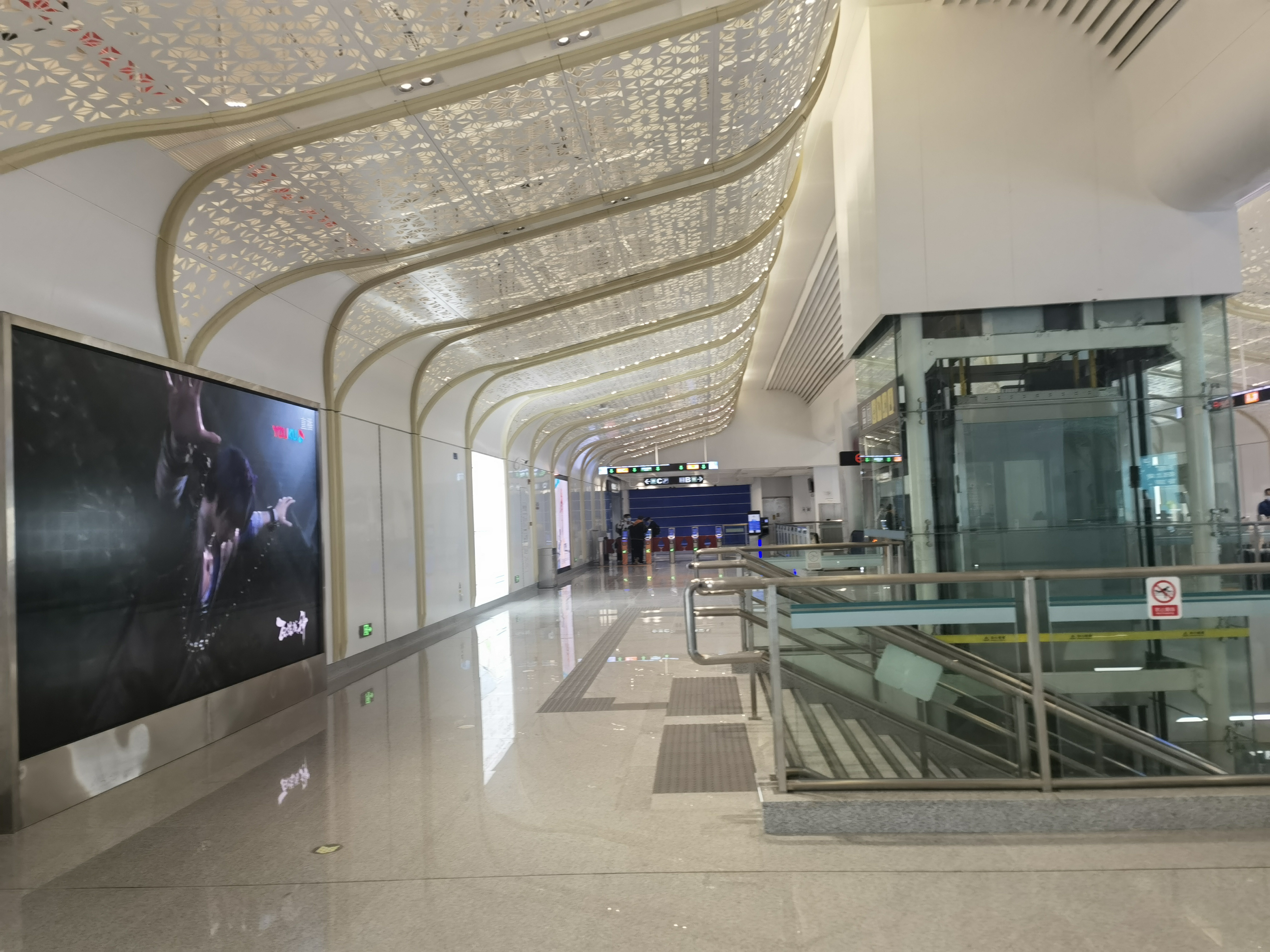
- Concourse

General information
- Location: Guangming District, Shenzhen, Guangdong; China
- Coordinates: 22°32′58″N 114°7′22″E
- Operated by: SZMC (Shenzhen Metro Group)
- Line(s): Line 6 Branch
- Platforms: 2 (1 island platform)
- Tracks: 2

Construction
- Structure type: Underground
- Accessible: Yes

History
- Opened: 28 November 2022

Services
Preceding station	Shenzhen Metro	Following station
SUAT Terminus	Line 6 Branch	Zhenmei towards Guangmingcheng
Location

Sun Yat-sen University station (Chinese: 中大站; pinyin: Zhōngdà zhàn; Jyutping: zung^{1}daai^{6} zaam^{6}), is a station on Line 6 Branch of the Shenzhen Metro. It opened on 28 November 2022. Its name is derived from the nearby Shenzhen Campus of Sun Yat-sen University.

== Station layout ==
G	-	Exit
B1F; Concourse	Lobby	Customer Service, Shops, Vending machines, ATMs
B2F; Platforms	Platform	6B towards Guangmingcheng (Zhenmei)
B2F; Platforms	Island platform, doors will open on the left
B2F; Platforms	Platform	6B towards SUAT (Terminus)

== Exits ==
Exit	Destination
