= Zhongshan Park station =

Zhongshan Park station may refer to:

- Zhongshan Park station (Shanghai Metro), a station on the Shanghai Metro in Shanghai
- Zhongshan Park station (Wuhan Metro), a station on the Wuhan Metro in Wuhan, Hubei
- Zhongshan Park station (Qingdao Metro), a station on the Qingdao Metro in Shinan District, Qingdao
- Zhongshan Park station (Xiamen Metro), a station on the Xiamen Metro in Siming District, Xiamen
- Zhongshan Park station (Shenzhen Metro), a station on the Shenzhen Metro in Shenzhen
- Zhongshan Park station (Wuxi Metro), a station on the Wuxi Metro in Jiangyin, Wuxi
- Zhongshan Park station (Foshan Metro), a station on the Foshan Metro in Chancheng District, Foshan

== See also ==
- Nakayama Station (disambiguation)
- Zhongshan Station (disambiguation)
- Zhongshan (disambiguation)
