= Sun Yat-sen University station =

Sun Yat-sen University station may refer to:

- Sun Yat-sen University station (Guangzhou Metro), a station on the Guangzhou Metro in Guangzhou, Guangdong.
- Sun Yat-sen University station (Shenzhen Metro), a station on the Shenzhen Metro in Shenzhen, Guangdong.
