= Guangming Culture and Art Center =

Arts center in Shenzhen, China

Coordinates: 22.7496°N 113.9322°E

Guangming Culture and Art Center (Simplified Chinese: 光明文化艺术中心，Traditional Chinese: 光明文化藝術中心) is a public cultural and arts facility located in Guangming District, Shenzhen, Guangdong Province, China. Situated at the intersection of Guanguang Road and Guangming Avenue, it has a total construction area of 130,000 square meters. The center includes a theater with a capacity of 1,500 seats, a 500-seat concert hall, an art gallery, a library, an exhibition hall, and more. Completed in 2020, it was funded by the Guangming District Government and is operated by Shenzhen OCT Cultural and Sports Industry Management Co., Ltd. The building features an iconic spiral staircase and a futuristic arched entrance known as the "Eye of Guangming", and has been awarded the Luban Prize for Architecture in China.

== Gallery ==
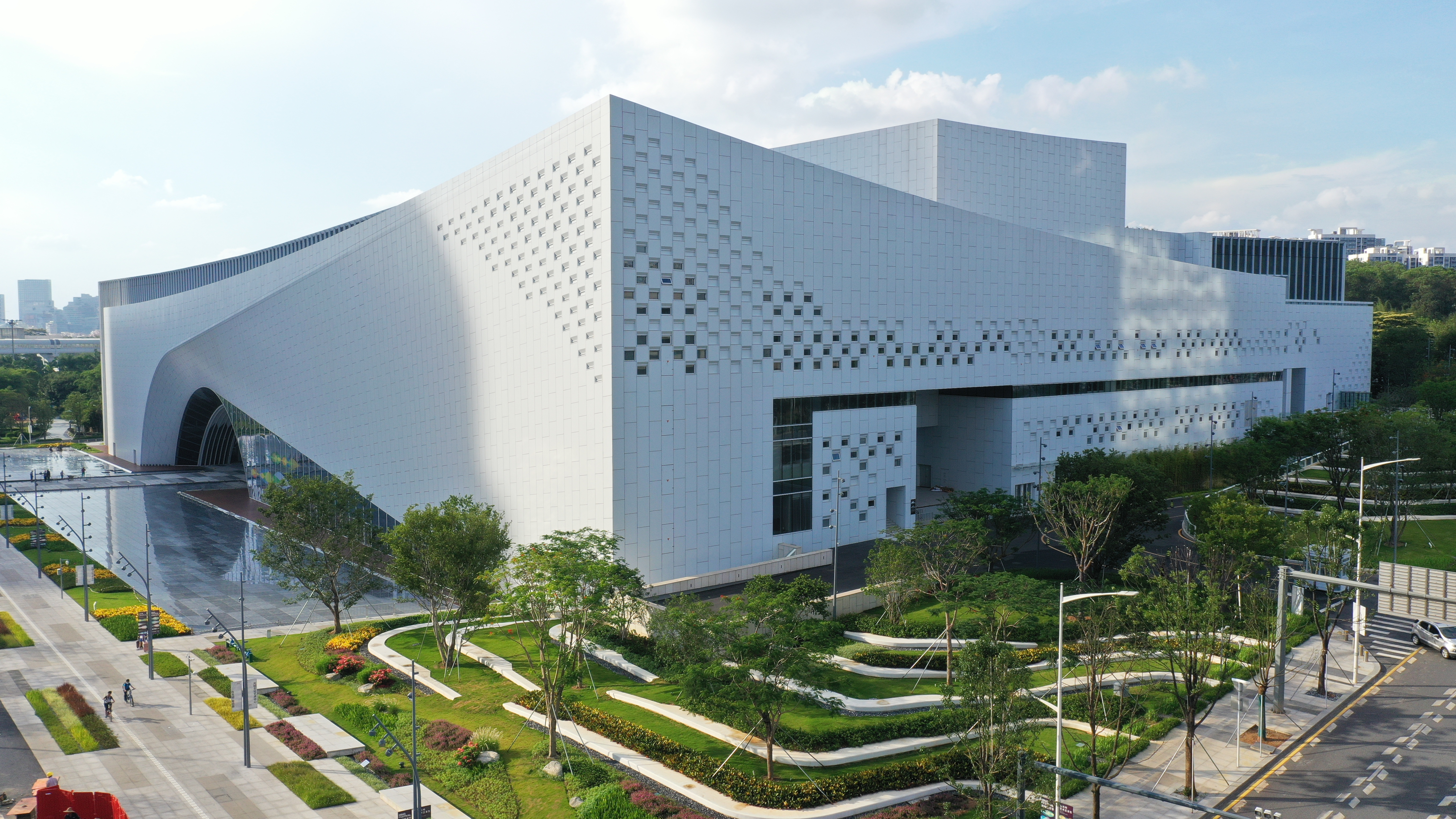
Exterior View

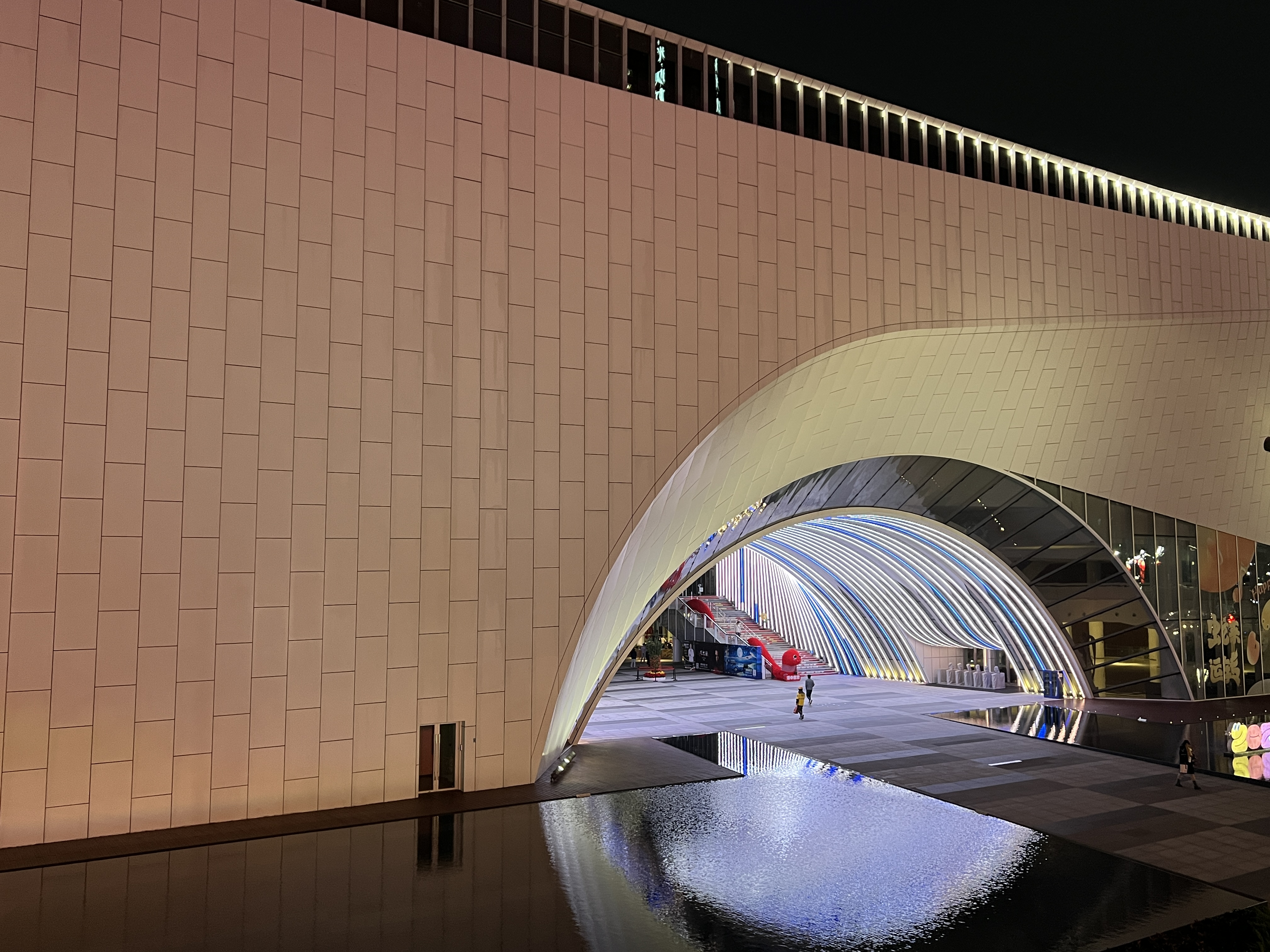
Night View

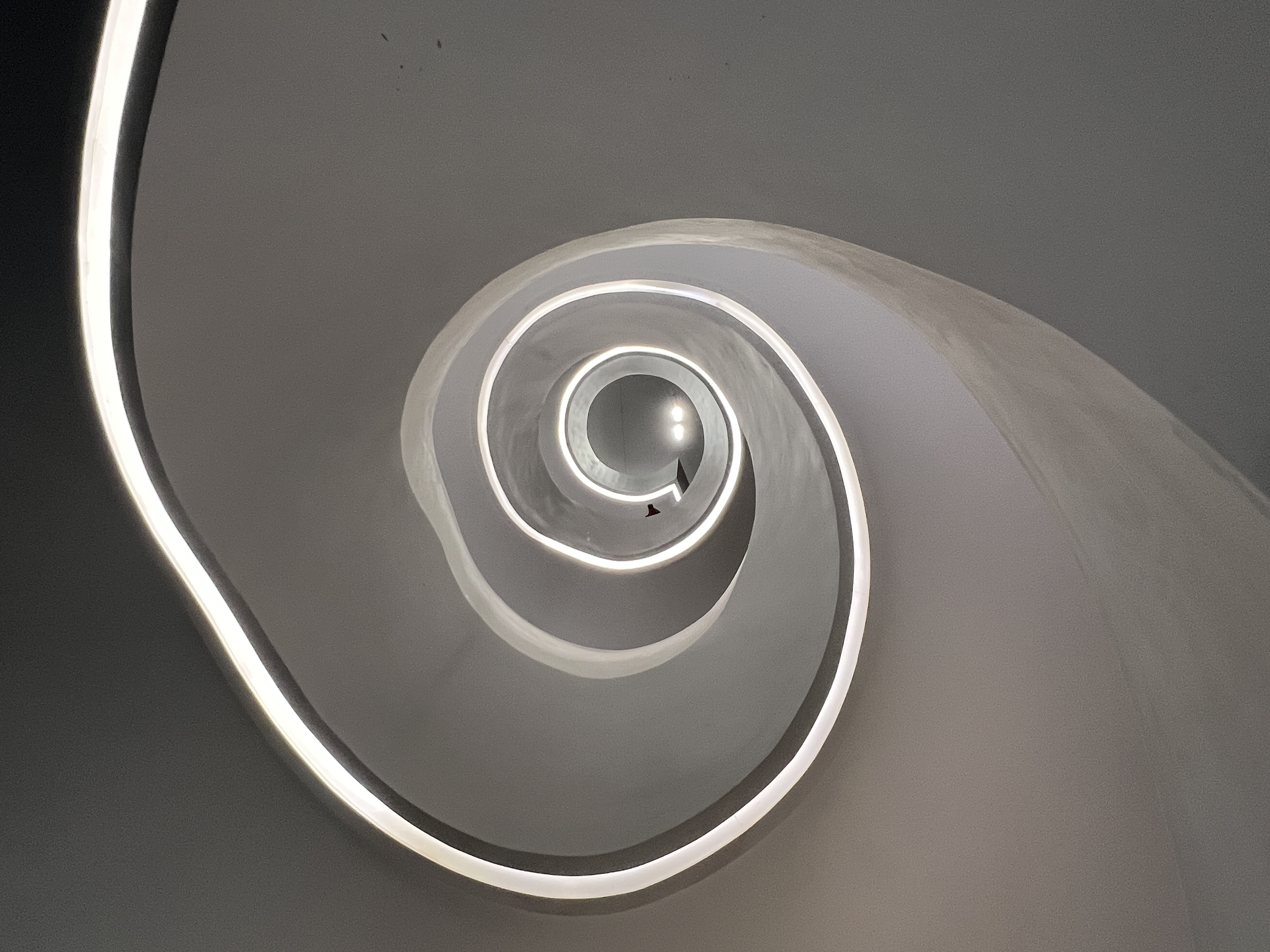
Spiral Staircase

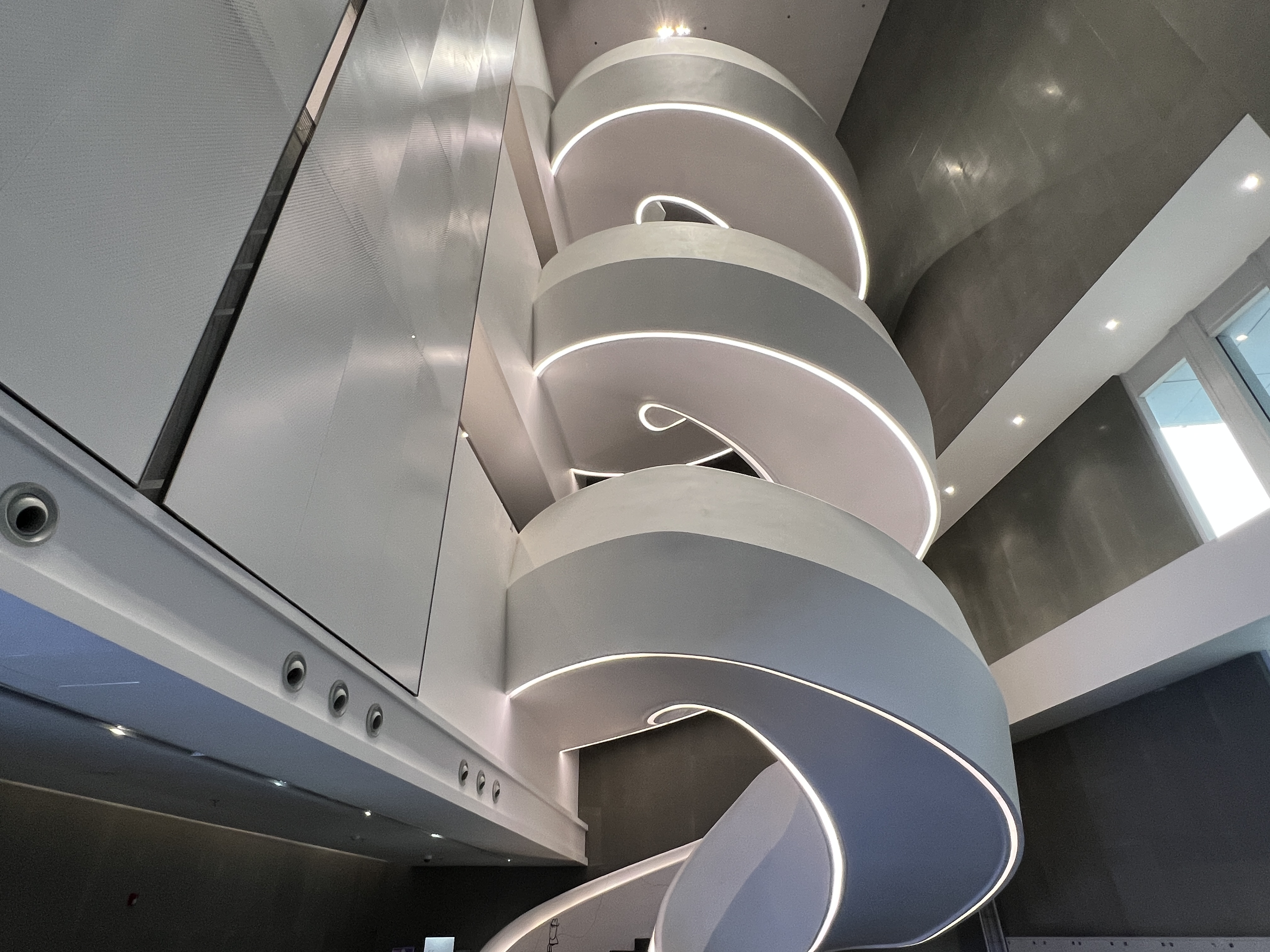
Spiral Staircase

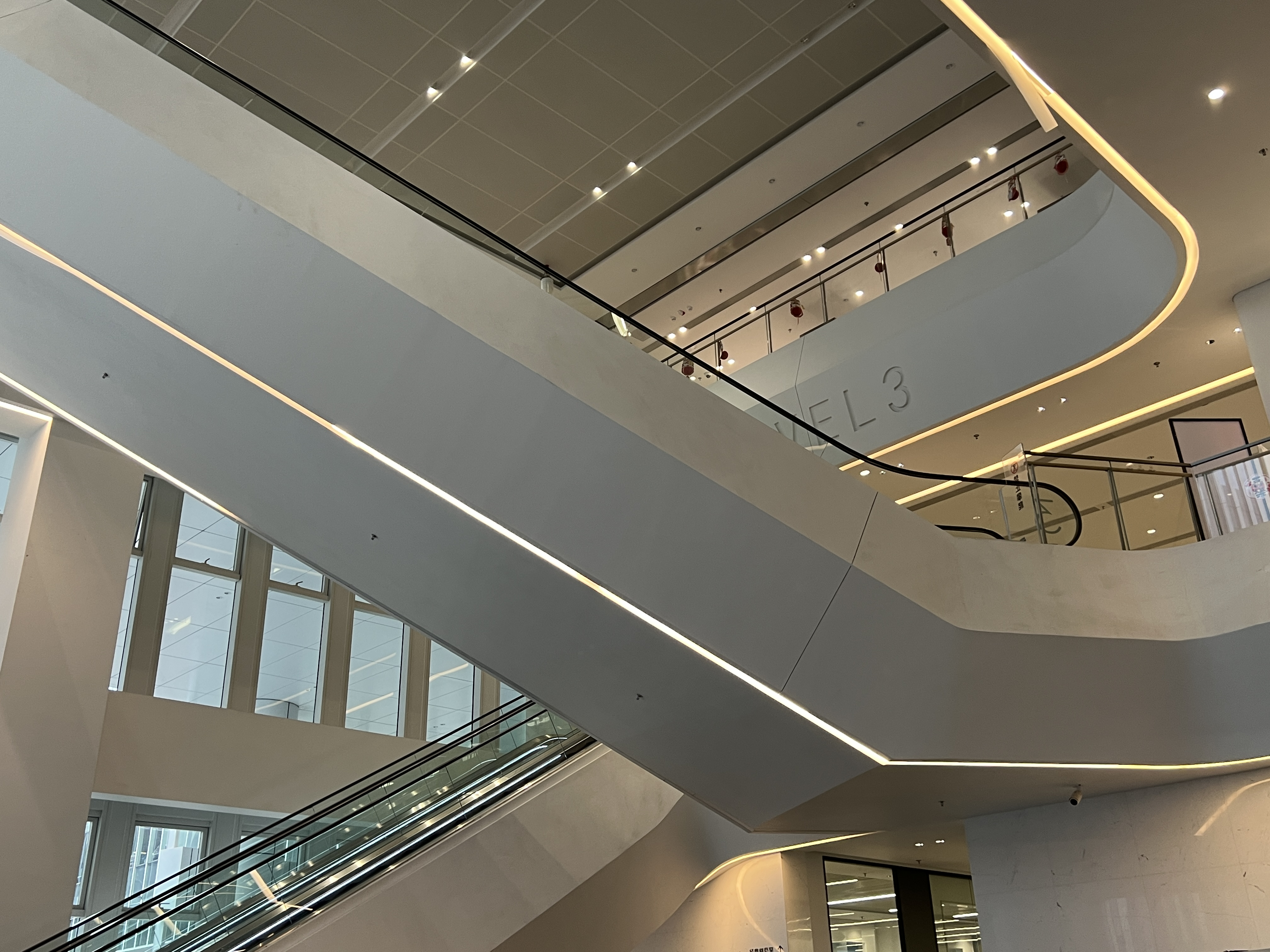
Library Escalator
