= Shenzhen University of Advanced Technology station =

Station of Shenzhen Metro

SUAT 深理工
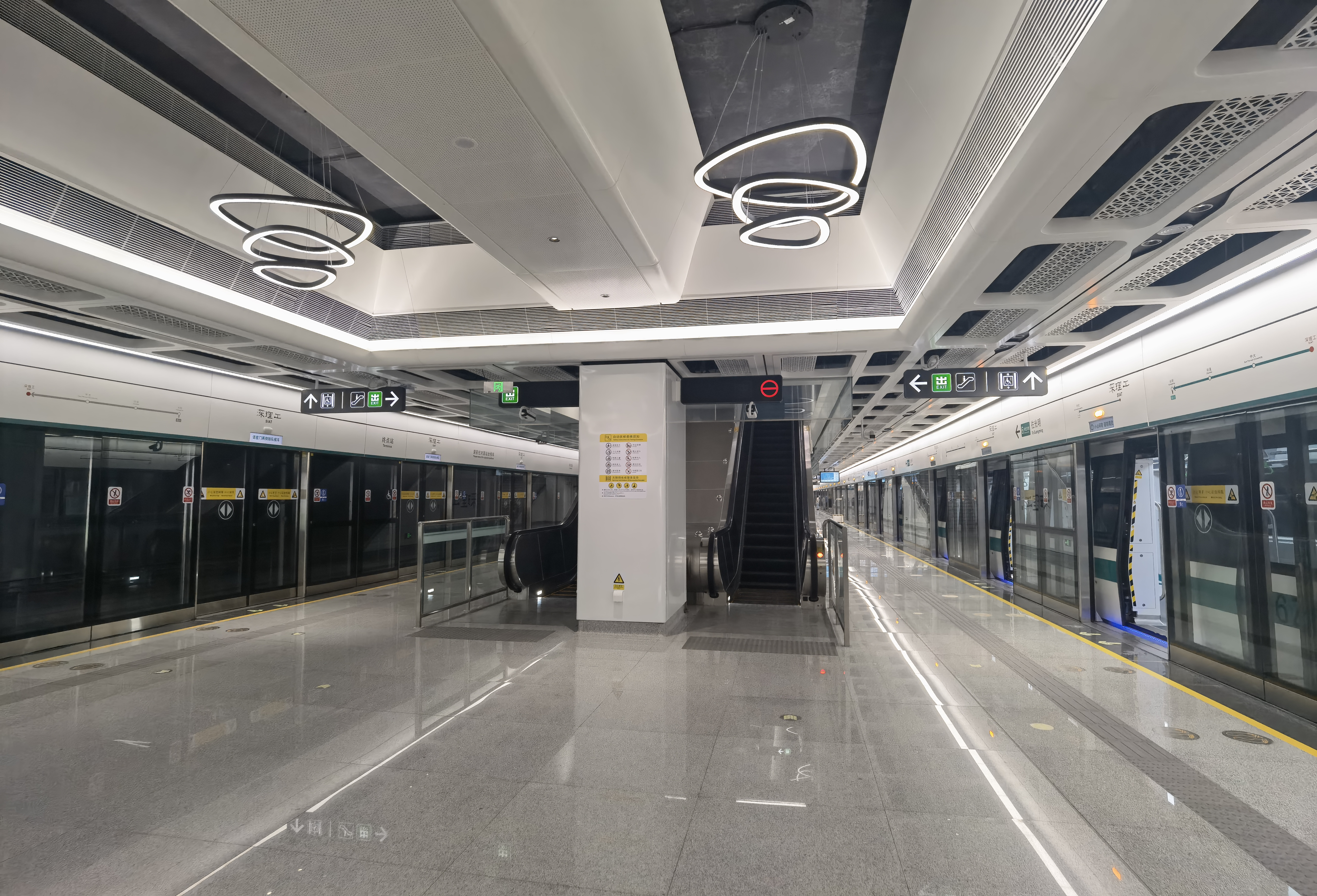
- Platform

General information
- Location: Guangming District, Shenzhen, Guangdong; China
- Coordinates: 22°48′34″N 113°57′51″E
- Operated by: SZMC (Shenzhen Metro Group)
- Line: Line 6 Branch
- Platforms: 2 (1 island platform)
- Tracks: 2

Construction
- Structure type: Underground
- Accessible: Yes

History
- Opened: 28 November 2022
- Previous names: SIAT

Services
Preceding station	Shenzhen Metro	Following station
Terminus	Line 6 Branch	Sun Yat-sen University towards Guangmingcheng
Future services
Huangjiang South Terminus	Line 6 Branch	Sun Yat-sen University towards Guangmingcheng
Location

SUAT station (Chinese: 深理工站; pinyin: Shēn Lǐgōng zhàn) is a station on Line 6 Branch of the Shenzhen Metro. It opened on 28 November 2022. Its name is derived from the nearby Shenzhen University of Advanced Technology, Chinese Academy of Sciences (Chinese: 中国科学院深圳理工大学).

== Station layout ==
G	-	Exit
B1F; Concourse	Lobby	Customer Service, Shops, Vending machines, ATMs
B2F; Platforms	Platform	6B towards Guangmingcheng (Sun Yat-sen University)
B2F; Platforms	Island platform, doors will open on the left
B2F; Platforms	Platform	6B reserved platform

== Exits ==
Exit		Destination
C1	C2	Guang Ming Science City, Shenzhen Medical Academy of Research and Translation (SMART)
