= Zhongshan (disambiguation) =

Zhongshan (中山市) is a prefecture-level city in Guangdong province, People's Republic of China.

Zhongshan may also refer to:

== People ==
- Sun Yat-sen (1866–1925) or Sun Zhongshan (孫中山), Chinese politician and the founding father of the Republic of China
  - Zhongshan suit, a type of clothing
  - Sun Yat-sen University, in Guangzhou, Guangdong
  - Chinese gunboat Zhongshan, named after Dr. Sun Yat-sen in 1925
- Zhong Shan (钟山, born 1955), male Chinese politician, Minister of Commerce of the People's Republic of China

== Places ==
=== China ===
- Zhongshan (state), of the Zhou Dynasty
- Zhongshan County (钟山县), Guangxi
- Zhongshan District, Liupanshui, Guizhou
- Zhongshan District, Dalian, Liaoning
  - Zhongshan Square
  - Zhongshan Park Subdistrict, Shahekou District, Dalian, Liaoning
- Zhongshan Island, Guangdong
- North Zhongshan Road station, Shanghai Metro
- Purple Mountain (Nanjing), also known as Zhongshan (钟山), Nanjing, Jiangsu

=== Taiwan ===
- Zhongshan District, Keelung, Taiwan
- Zhongshan District, Taipei, Taiwan
  - Zhongshan metro station
  - Zhongshan Elementary School metro station
  - Zhongshan Junior High School metro station

=== Various ===
- Zhongshan Park, several uses
- List of streets named after Sun Yat-sen
- Zhongshan Station (Antarctica), a Chinese Antarctic research station

== Other uses ==
- Zhongshan Kingdom (Han dynasty), a Han dynasty kingdom
- Zhongshan, the Chinese name of the star Omicron Herculis

== See also ==
- 中山 (disambiguation)
- Chung Shan (disambiguation)
- Nakayama (disambiguation) (中山), Japanese surname written with the same Chinese characters as "Zhongshan", and the inspiration for Sun Yatsen's choice of nom de guerre
- Zhongshan Park Station (disambiguation)
- Zhongshan Station (disambiguation)
