= Chung Shan =

Chung Shan is a historical alternative spelling of "Zhongshan", a Chinese name. It most commonly refers to:

- Sun Yat-sen (1866–1925), pseudonym Chung Shan, Chinese revolutionary and political leader
- Chung Shan (warship), a gunboat named after Sun Yat-sen
- Zhongshan, a city in Guangdong, China
- Zhongshan District, Taipei, Taiwan
- Chung Shan Industrial and Commercial School, Daliao District, Kaohsiung, Taiwan

== See also ==
- Zhongshan (disambiguation)
