= Shenzhen University of Advanced Technology =

Polytechnic university in Shenzhen, China

Coordinates: 22°48′12″N 113°57′48″E

- 深圳理工大学
- Type: Public university
- Established: 2024
- Founders: Shenzhen Municipal People's Government
- Affiliations: Shenzhen Municipal People's Government
- President: Fan Jianping
- Location: 1 Gongchang Road, Guangming District, Shenzhen, Guangdong Province, the People's Republic of China
- Campus: Main campus (Guangming), Xili campus (Nanshan), Mingzhu campus (Guangming)
- Colors: SUAT Purple; SUAT Gray
- Website: suat-sz.edu.cn

Shenzhen University of Advanced Technology (Chinese: 深圳理工大学, abbreviation: SUAT) is a public polytechnic university located in Shenzhen, the People's Republic of China. It is jointly established by Shenzhen Municipal People's Government and Shenzhen Institutes of Advanced Technology, Chinese Academy of Sciences.

== Campuses ==
=== Main campus ===
The main campus is located in Guangming District on the east side of the intersection of Gongchang Road and Beizhen Road in |Xinhua Subdistrict. It covers an area of 544,065.12 m^{2} and has a gross floor area of 562,418 m^{2}. To the west are Sun Yat-sen University Shenzhen Campus and the Weiguang Biotech Industrial Park, and to the east is Guangming Forest Park.

The main campus was designed by a consortium of "China Academy of Building Research Co., Ltd., Beijing Critical Space Architectural Design Consulting Co., Ltd., and Wadi Engineering Design Consulting (Beijing) Co., Ltd.", and construction began in December 2021. The first phase was delivered for use in August 2024, and phases two and three were expected to be completed by the end of 2024.

=== Xili campus ===
The Xili campus of Shenzhen University of Advanced Technology is located in Nanshan District in Xili Lake International Science and Education City. It covers an area of 51,000 m^{2} and has a gross floor area of 138,000 m^{2}.

=== Mingzhu campus (transitional campus) ===
The Mingzhu campus of Shenzhen University of Advanced Technology is located in the Binhai Mingzhu Industrial Park in Guangming District. It is the university's transitional campus, covering an area of 64,000 m^{2} with a gross floor area of 95,000 m^{2}, mainly comprising 9 buildings including public teaching buildings and dormitories.

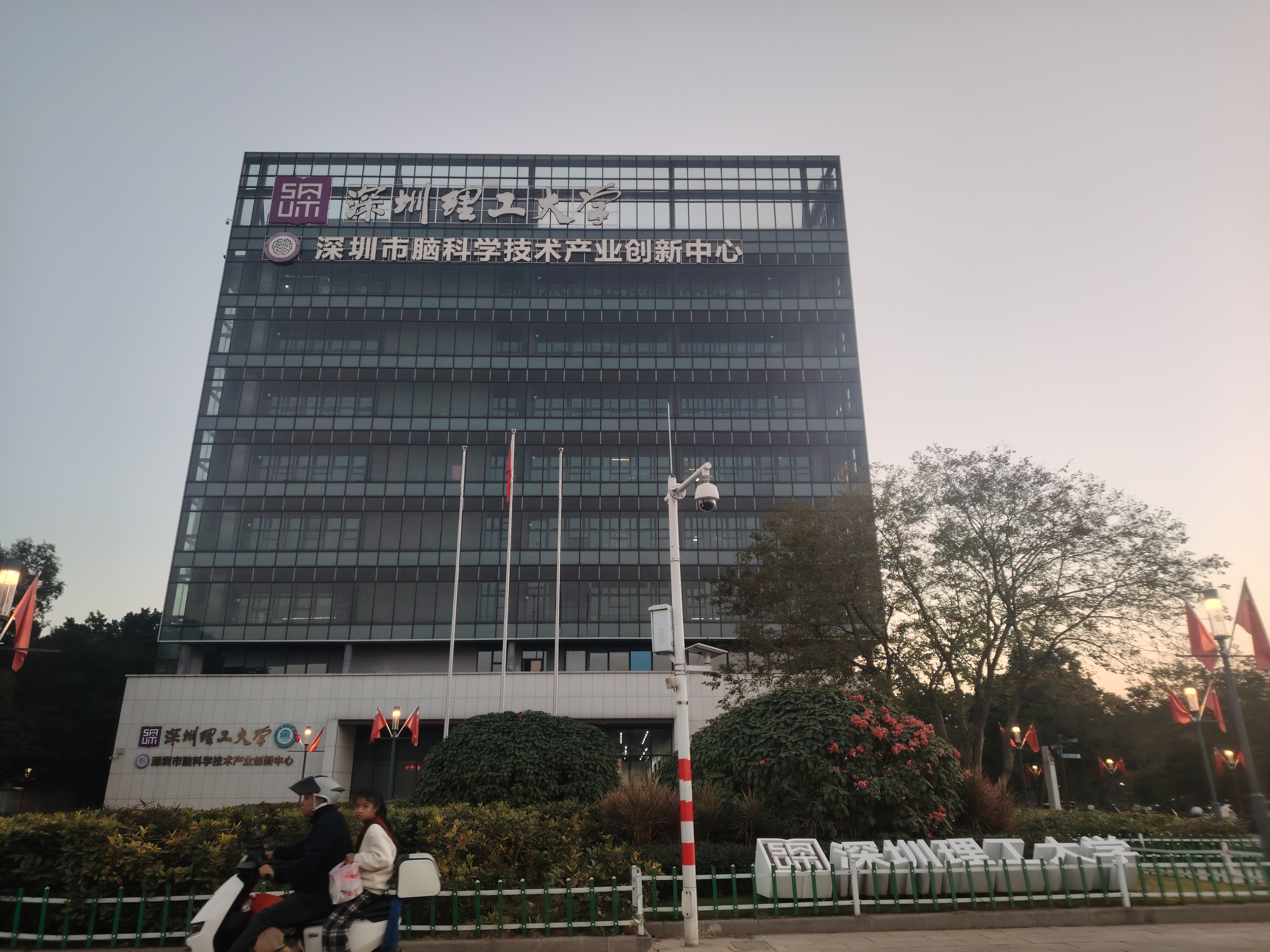
Mingzhu campus main building

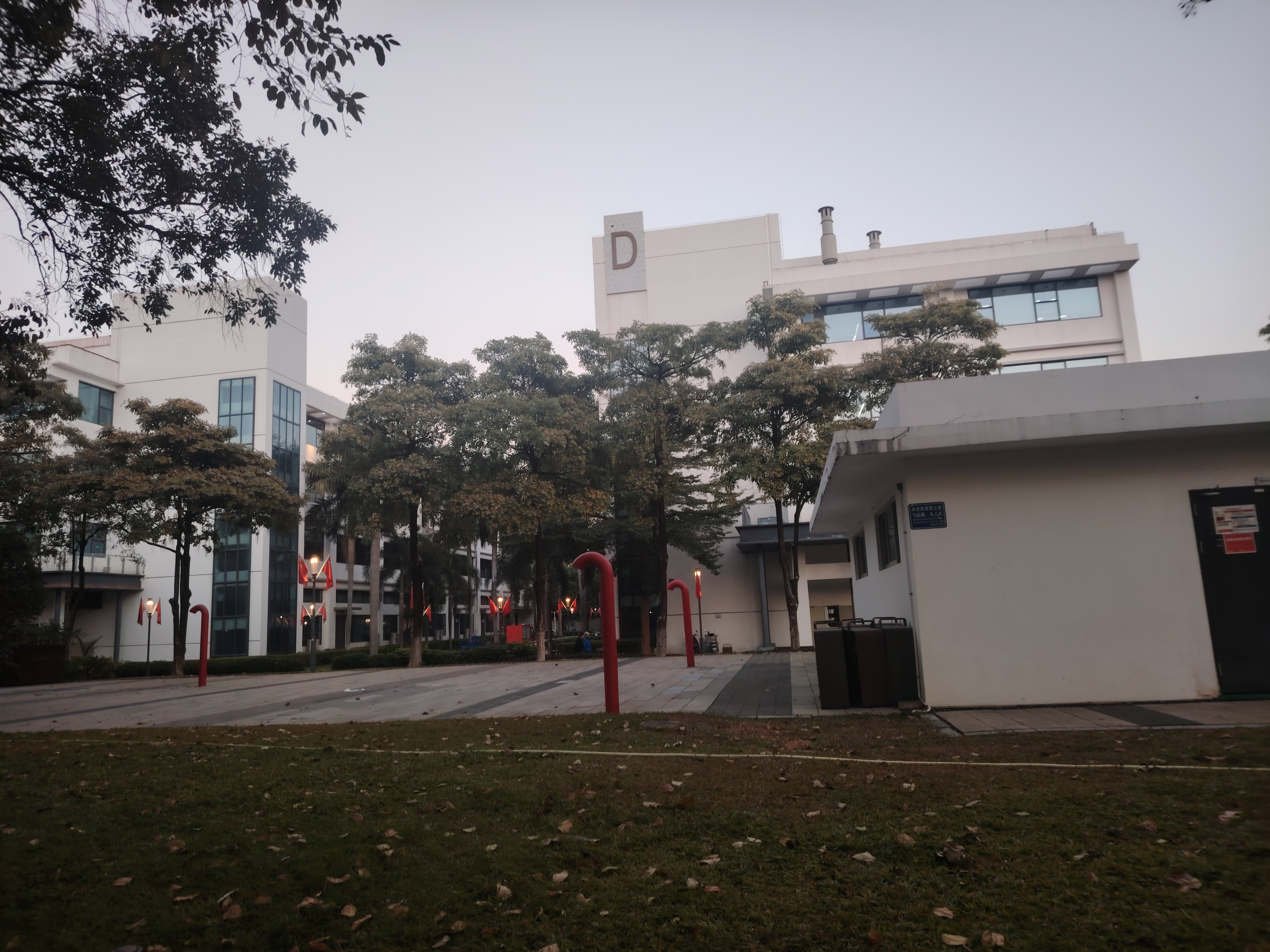
Mingzhu campus Building D
