= Sun Yat-sen Memorial Hall Station =

Sun Yat-sen Memorial Hall Station may refer to:

- Sun Yat-sen Memorial Hall station (Guangzhou Metro), a station on the Guangzhou Metro in Guangzhou, Guangdong.
- Sun Yat-sen Memorial Hall MRT station, a station on the Taipei Metro in Taipei, Taiwan.
