= Nakayama =

Nakayama (中山) may refer to:

== People ==
- Nakayama (surname)

== Places ==
- Nakayama, Ehime, a town in Ehime Prefecture
- Nakayama, Tottori, a town in Tottori Prefecture
- Nakayama, Yamagata, a town in Yamagata Prefecture
- Nakayama-dera, a temple in Hyōgo Prefecture
- Zhongshan District, Taipei (中山區), a district in Taipei named after Sun Yat-sen, also known as his Japanese name Nakayama shō. The Japanese broadcasting of Zhongshan metro station is pronounced as Nakayama in the station.

== Other uses ==
- Nakayama Racecourse, a horse racing track in Chiba Prefecture
  - Nakayama Grand Jump, an annual steeplechase
- Nakayama Circuit, a motorsport venue in Okayama Prefecture
- Nakayama Station (Kanagawa)
- Nakayama Station (Hyogo)

== See also ==
- Nakayama lemma, a lemma in commutative algebra
