= Guangmingcheng railway station =

Railway station in Shenzhen, China

Guangmingcheng 光明城
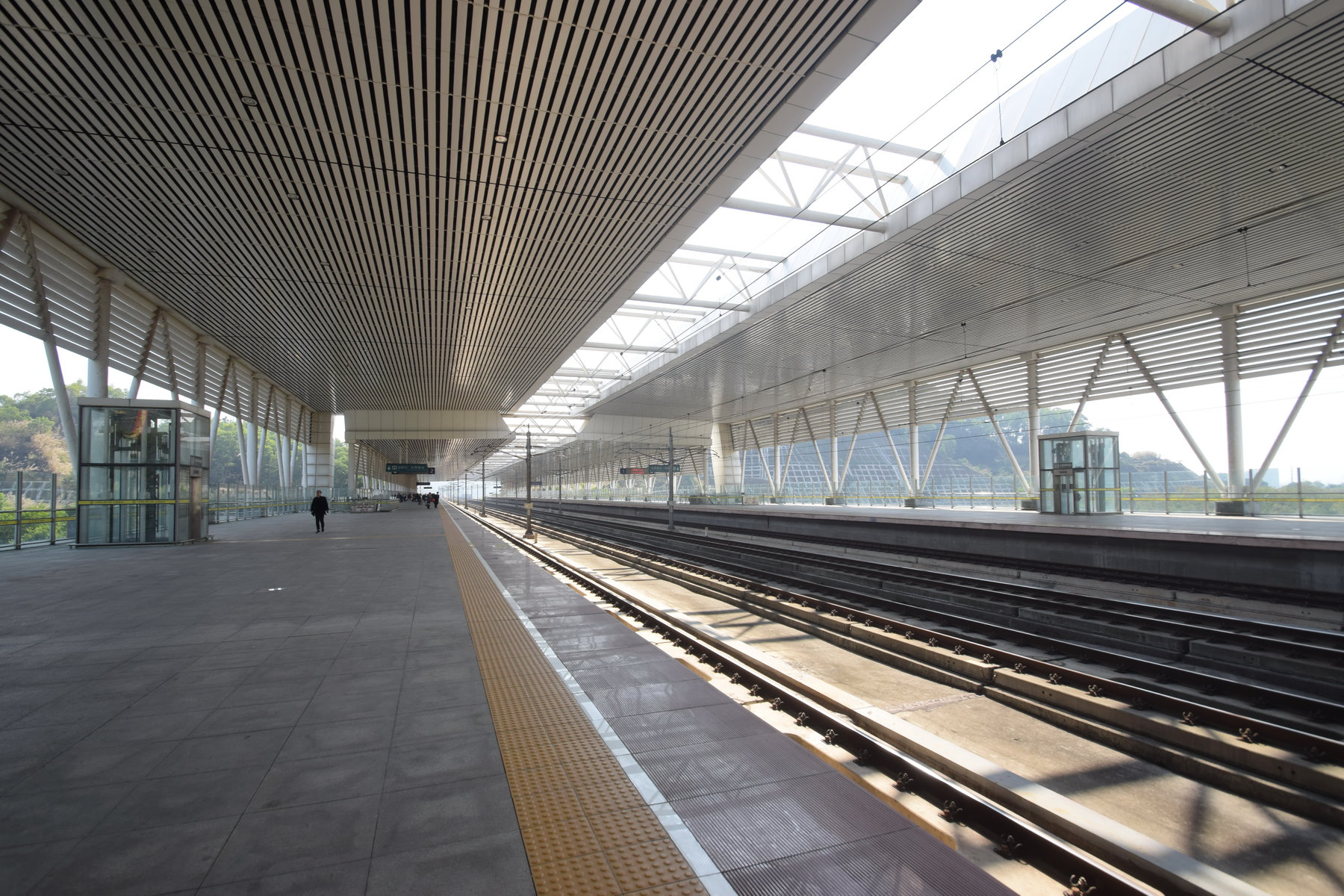
- Platform

Chinese name
- Chinese: 光明城
Transcriptions
Standard Mandarin
- Hanyu Pinyin: Guāngmíngchéng
Yue: Cantonese
- Yale Romanization: Gwōngmìhngsìhng
- Jyutping: Gwong1ming4sing4

General information
- Location: 38th Road, Fenghuang Subdistrict, Guangming District, Shenzhen, Guangdong; China
- Coordinates: 22.7357°N 113.9495°E
- Line: Guang-Shen-HK XRL
- Platforms: 4 (4 side platforms)
- Tracks: 8

Construction
- Structure type: Elevated
- Accessible: Yes

Other information
- Station code: TMIS code: 65857; Telegraph code: IMQ; Pinyin code: GMC
- Classification: 3rd class station

History
- Opened: 26 December 2011; 14 years ago
Route map
Location

Guangmingcheng railway station (Chinese: 光明城站; pinyin: Guāngmíngchéng Zhàn; Cantonese Yale: Gwōngmìhngsìhng Jaahm; lit. 'Bright City railway station') is a railway station of the Guangzhou–Shenzhen–Hong Kong Express Rail Link and is located in Guangming District, Shenzhen, Guangdong, China.

== Name ==
It is named after the urban area (so-called "city" / "城") of Guangming District in Shenzhen city.

== China Railway ==
The Guangzhou–Shenzhen–Hong Kong Express Rail Link is in service. The line starts at Guangzhou and ends at the West Kowloon Terminal in Hong Kong.

=== Guangzhou-Shenzhen-Hong Kong Express Rail Link ===
Start station: Guangzhou South End station: Hong Kong West Kowloon

== Shenzhen Metro ==
Guangmingcheng 光明城
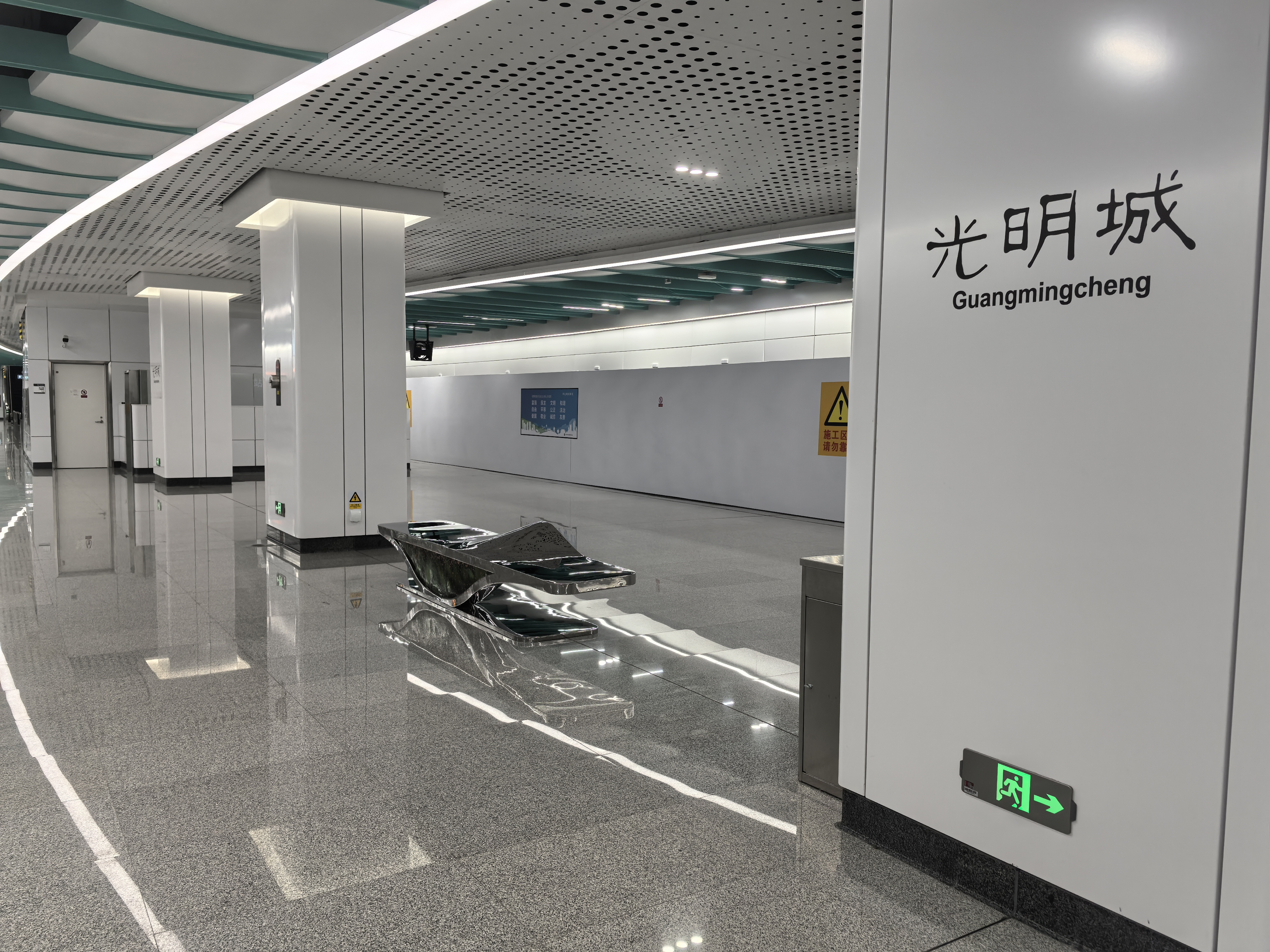
- Line 6 branch platform on first day of operation (28 September 2025)

Chinese name
- Chinese: 光明城
Transcriptions
Standard Mandarin
- Hanyu Pinyin: Guāngmíngchéng
Yue: Cantonese
- Yale Romanization: Gwōngmìhngsìhng
- Jyutping: Gwong1ming4sing4
- Hong Kong Romanization: Kwong Ming Shing

General information
- Location: Guangmingcheng Railway Station West Square; Guangming Subdistrict, Guangming District, Shenzhen, Guangdong; China
- Operated by: SZMC (Shenzhen Metro Group)
- Lines: Line 6 Branch; Line 13
- Platforms: 4 (2 island platforms)
- Tracks: 4

Construction
- Structure type: Underground
- Accessible: Yes

History
- Opened: 28 September 2025 (9 months ago)

Services
| Preceding station | Shenzhen Metro | Following station |
|---|---|---|
| Hongqiao Park towards SUAT | Line 6 Branch | Terminus |
| Hong'ao Park towards Shenzhen Bay Checkpoint | Line 13 | Deya Road towards Lisonglang |
Location

The metro station serving the railway station opened on 28 September 2025 as part of the Phase Two extension of Line 6B. The Line 13 portion of the station opened on 28 June 2026.

The station is one of the four distinctive stations on the Line 13 Phase II northern extension. The design theme draws inspiration from the mountain and sea landscape of the Greater Bay Area, reshaping the spatial form with dynamic curves.

=== Station layout (metro) ===
| G | - | Exits A-C |
| B1F; Concourse | Lobby | Ticket Machines, Customer Service, Station Control Room, Toilets |
| B2F; Platforms | Platform 3 | 13 towards Shenzhen Bay Checkpoint (Hong'ao Park) |
| B2F; Platforms | Island platform, doors will open on the right for 6B and left for 13 |
| B2F; Platforms | | 6B termination platform |
| B2F; Platforms | | 6B towards SUAT (Hongqiao Park) |
| B2F; Platforms | Island platform, doors will open on the right for 6B and left for 13 |
| B2F; Platforms | Platform 4 | 13 towards Lisonglang (Deya Road) |

=== Entrances/exits ===
The station has 3 points of entry/exit. Exit B is equipped with an elevator and a toilet.

- : Chalin Road, Fengxing Road, Chengzhan East Road, Fengci Road, Guangmingcheng Railway Station
- : Chalin Road, Qiaokai Road, Chengzhan East Road, Fengci Road, Guangmingcheng Railway Station
- : Chalin Road, Qiaokai Road, Kelin Road

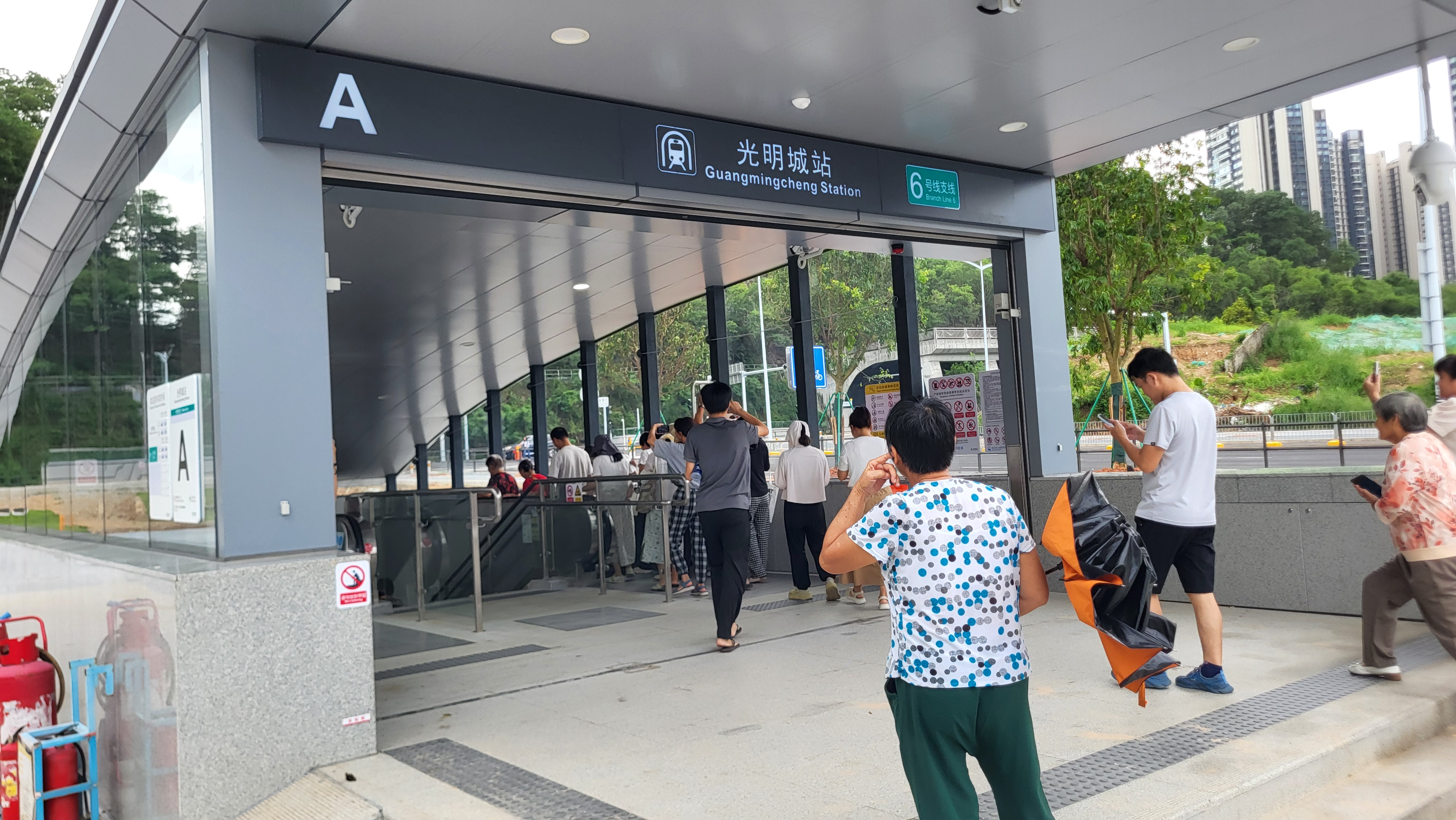
Entrance A

=== Gallery ===
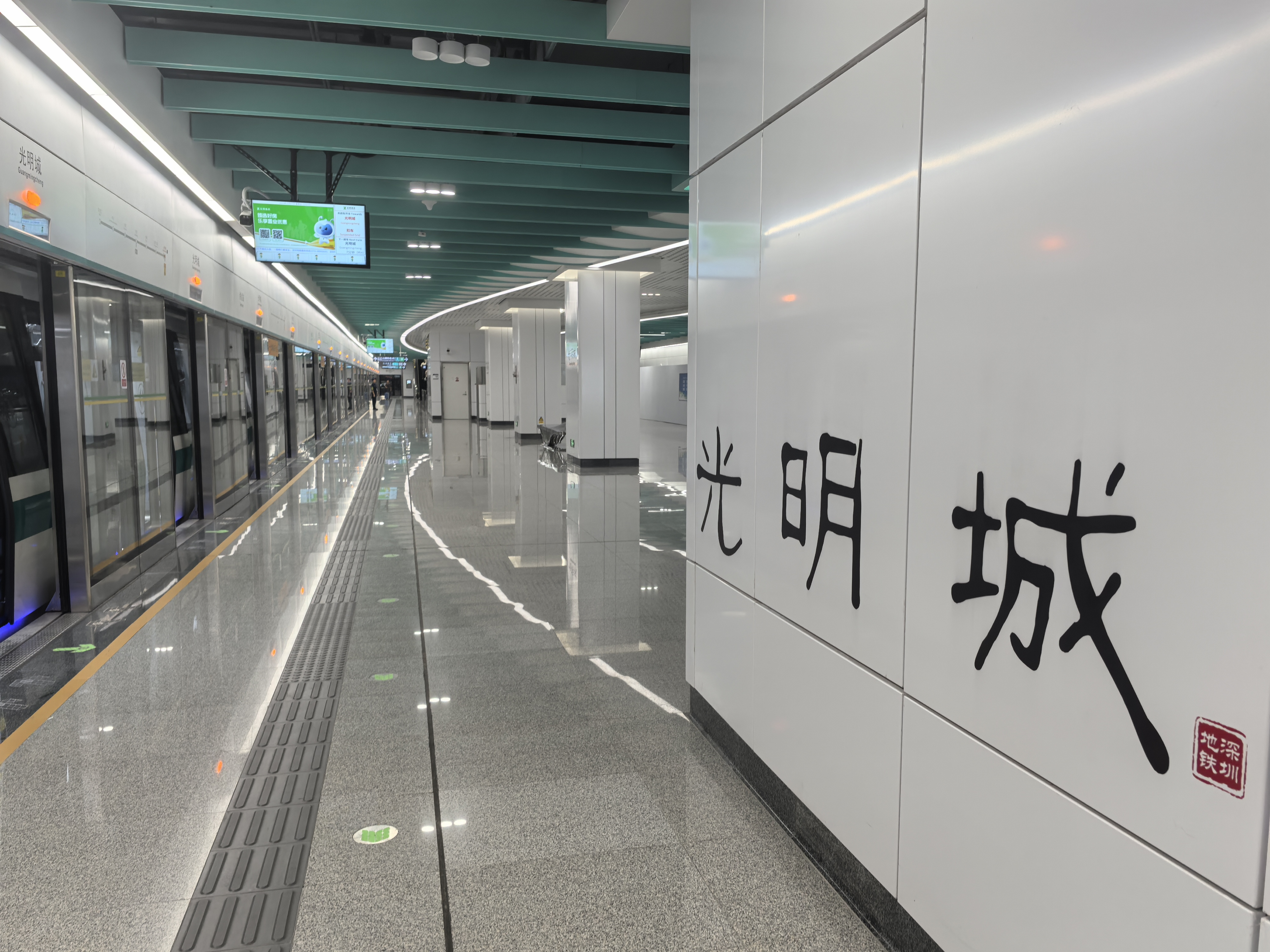
Calligraphy

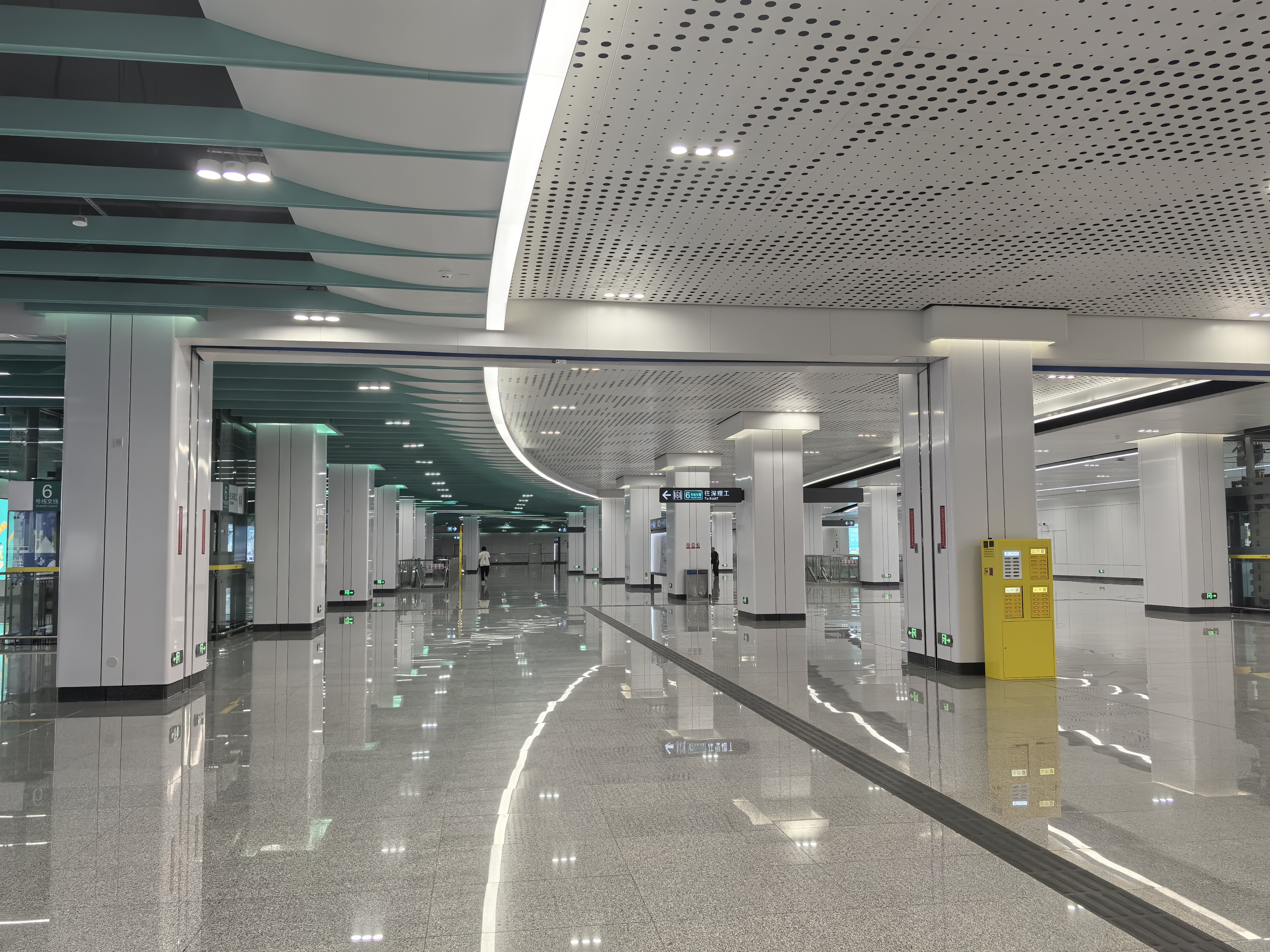
Concourse

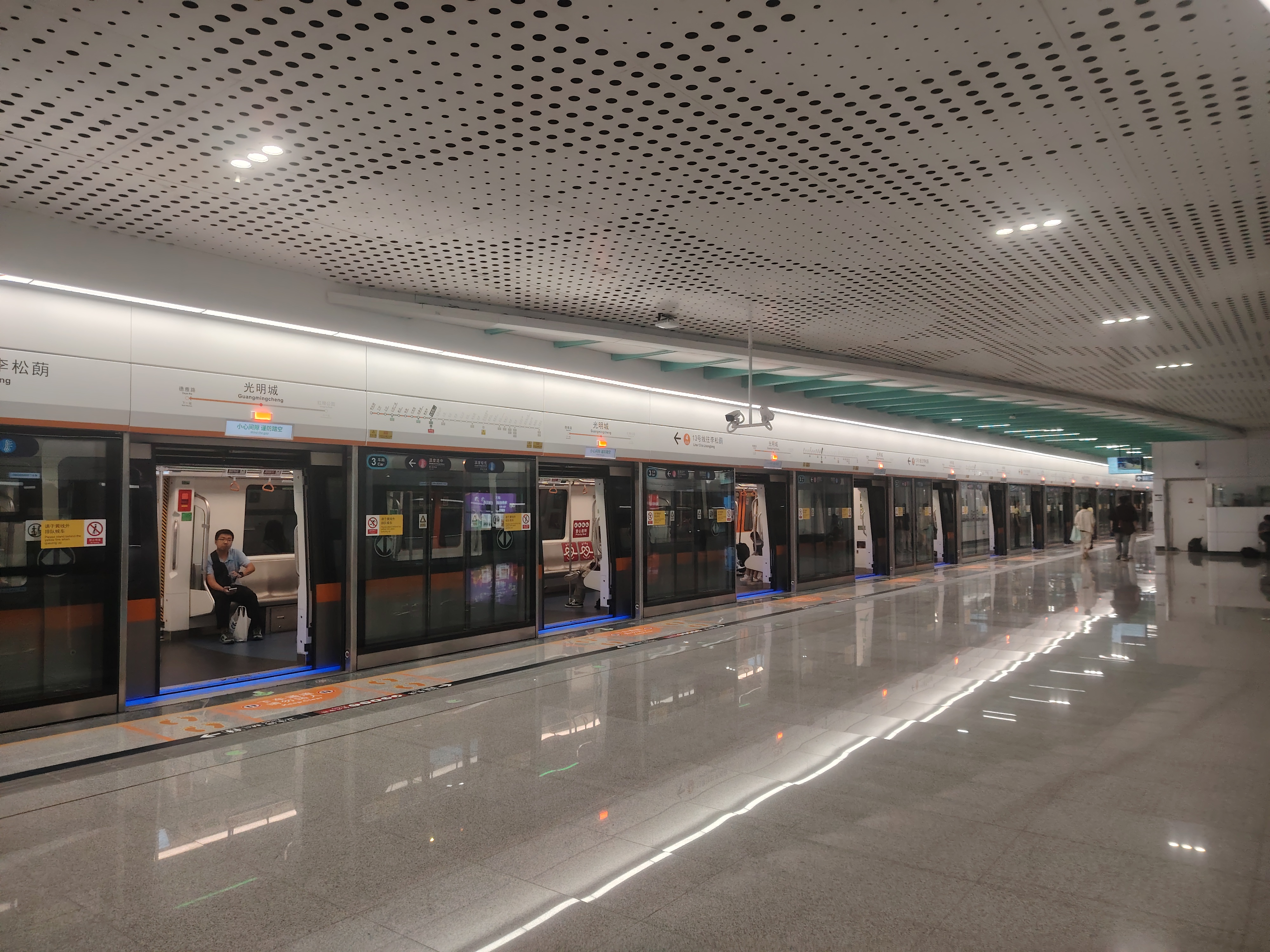
Line 13 platform 4 (towards Lisonglang)

| Preceding station | China Railway High-speed | Following station |
|---|---|---|
| Humen towards Beijing West | Beijing–Guangzhou–Shenzhen–Hong Kong high-speed railway | Shenzhen North towards Hong Kong West Kowloon |
| Dongguan South towards Ganzhou West | Ganzhou–Shenzhen high-speed railway | Shenzhen North Terminus |
