= Guangming, Shenzhen =

Guangming 光明区
- District
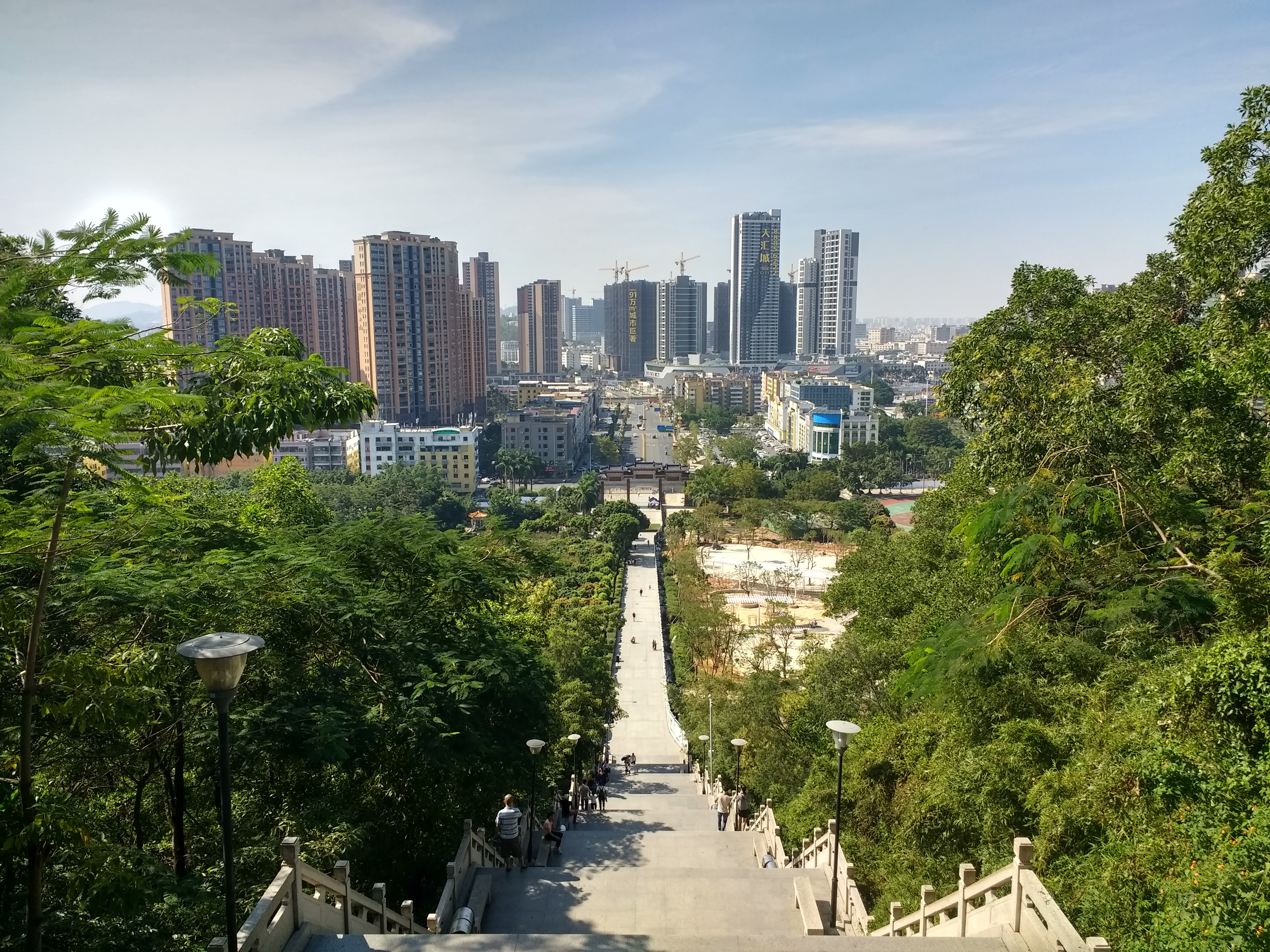
- Honghuashan Park, Guangming District

- Guangming (top left, highlighted in teal ) within Shenzhen
- Interactive map of Guangming
- Country: People's Republic of China
- Province: Guangdong
- Sub-provincial city: Shenzhen

Area
  - Total: 156.1 km^{2} (60.3 sq mi)

Population (2020)
  - Total: 1,095,289
  - Density: 7,017/km^{2} (18,170/sq mi)
- Time zone: UTC+8 (China Standard)
- Area code: 0755
- Website: www.szgm.gov.cn

Guangming District
- Simplified Chinese: 光明区
- Traditional Chinese: 光明區
- Guangdong Romanization: guong1 ming4 kêu1
- Hanyu Pinyin: Guāngmíng Qū
Transcriptions
Standard Mandarin
- Hanyu Pinyin: Guāngmíng Qū
Yue: Cantonese
- Yale Romanization: Gwōngmìhng Kēui
- Jyutping: gwong1 ming4 keoi1
- Canton Romanization: guong1 ming4 kêu1

Alternative Chinese name
- Chinese: 光明
- Guangdong Romanization: guong1 ming4
- Hanyu Pinyin: Guāngmíng
Transcriptions
Standard Mandarin
- Hanyu Pinyin: Guāngmíng
Yue: Cantonese
- Yale Romanization: Gwōngmìhng
- Jyutping: gwong1 ming4
- Canton Romanization: guong1 ming4

Guangming District is one of nine districts in the city of Shenzhen. The district, bordering the city of Dongguan in the Northwest of Shenzhen, was created in 2007 as a "functional area" of Bao'an District. In May 2018, it became a formal administrative division.

Guangming District has a total area of 156.1 square kilometers and a resident population of 1,095,300 residents. In 2020, Guangming District achieved a regional GDP of 110.77 billion yuan, an increase of 5.7%, the second-fastest growth rate in Shenzhen City. The initial formation of a new generation of emerging industries clustered development pattern regarding information technology, new materials, and biomedicine is also achieved.

Since Guangming District is located in the central axis of Guangzhou-Shenzhen-Hong Kong, an important node of the GZ-SZ Science & Technology Innovation Corridor, the municipal government plans to develop it with a focus on science and making it a northern centre for Shenzhen. The Guangming Science City project is about 78% complete in August 2021.

== History ==
Guangming District was formerly part of Bao'an District, Shenzhen City, Guangdong Province.

- On August 19, 2007, Guangming New District, the predecessor of Guangming District, was established as the first functional area in Shenzhen, with jurisdiction over two offices in Gongming and Guangming.
- On May 24, 2018, the State Council agreed to establish Guangming District and assign Guangming Subdistrict, Gongming Subdistrict, Xinhu Subdistrict, Fenghuang Subdistrict, Yutang Subdistrict, and Matian Subdistrict to the administrative area of Guangming District.
- On September 19, 2018, the Guangming District of Shenzhen was officially established.

== Development ==
Since its establishment, Guangming District has been closely focused on building a "World-class Science City and the Northern Center of Shenzhen" to promote the construction of major scientific and technological infrastructure and urban infrastructure. The development process of Guangming District for more than a decade has experienced several urban planning and construction, including the pilot construction of Sponge City, the construction of the Guangming Science City, etc.

=== Guangming Science City ===
Guangming Science City was proposed by the Shenzhen Municipal Committee and Shenzhen Government in April 2018 to promote basic research and innovation of core science and technology in Shenzhen. It was given to the construction of the three clusters, namely a cluster of large-scale scientific facilities, integrated science and education cluster, and science and technology innovation cluster. In September of the same year, the overall development plan of Guangming Science City formed a preliminary system, expanding the spatial plan to 99 square kilometers and building a general spatial layout of "One Core Two Zones".

On January 25, 2019, the launch of building supportive civil engineering projects for two large scientific services - brain analysis and simulation and synthetic biology research - heralded the official start of Guangming Science City.

In June 2020, Shenzhen Bay Laboratory officially settled in Guangming. At the same time, the Outline plan for Guangming Science City was officially approved by the city government. The Conference about the 40th anniversary of the establishment of the Shenzhen Special Economic Zone on October 14 further clarified that Guangming Science City will serve as the core function bearing area of the international science and technology innovation center of Guangdong-Hong Kong-Macao Greater Bay Area and an important part of the comprehensive national science center. In December of the same year, the Shenzhen Institute of Technology Innovation of the China Institute of Metrology and the Shenzhen Engineering Biological Industry Innovation Center was officially unveiled.

On February 20, 2021, the Overall Development Plan for Shenzhen Guangming Science City (2020-2035) provides a detailed description of the strategic positioning, development goals, and general layout for Guangming Science City.

Five Strategic Positioning of Guangming Science City

- The large and open world-class source of original innovation.
- The core hub of the international science and technology innovation center of Guangdong-Hong Kong-Macao Greater Bay Area.
- The core bearing area of the comprehensive national science center.
- The pilot-scale experiment and achievement transformation base leading high-quality development.
- The frontier position deepens scientific and technological innovation and institutional reform.

Guangming Science City Development Goals

The Overall Development Plan for Shenzhen Guangming Science City (2020-2035) further specifies that Guangming Science City will focus on the key areas of information, life, and new materials. By the end of 2022, the project plans to initially complete the layout of a world-class science city and form the core framework of a comprehensive national science center; by 2035, initially build a globally influential science and technology and industrial innovation highland with global influence.

Spatial layout of Guangming Science City

Guangming Science City constructs the overall spatial layout of "One Core Two Zones".

"One Core" is the central area of Guangming District. The construction of the life service center of Guangming District is based on the central area of Guangming to provide quality public services and special scientific service facilities for the development of Science City.

"Two Zones", namely the device clustering area and industrial transformation area. The device clustering area concentrates on major scientific and technological infrastructure, research institutions, frontier cross-sectional research platforms, and high-level universities to form a spatial layout of large-scale scientific facilities, integrated science and education cluster, and science and technology innovation cluster. The industrial transformation area is to cultivate future industries and new industries by placing transforming, incubating, and innovation and entrepreneurship services institutions.

The infrastructure of Guangming Science City

- The Seventh Affiliated Hospital, Sun Yat-sen University: The first phase of the construction project has been completed and opened to the society with 800 beds in total.
- Shenzhen Affiliated School of Sun Yat-sen University: It has a planned area of 67,000 square meters with a construction area of 150,000 square meters. The school was put into use in 2020.
- Culture and Art Center: The center covers an area of 38,000 square meters with a construction area of 130,000 square meters. It consists of buildings with different functions, including a performance center, an art gallery, a library, a comprehensive cultural center, and a planning exhibition hall.
- Shenzhen Science and Technology Museum: It is located in the core area of Guangming’s Central Science Park, adjacent to the west of Guangming Station of Metro Line 6. When completed, it will cover an area of about 66,000 square meters and have a total floor area of 125,000 square meters, with a technology display area, science education video area, innovation practice area, science exchange area, enterprise management area, and public service area.

Transportation of Guangming Science City

- Railways: Starting from Guangming Science City, it only takes 30 minutes by GZ-SZ-HK Express Rail Link to reach Hong Kong West Kowloon Railway Station and Guangzhou South Railway Station.
- Metro: Metro Line 6 passes by Guangming Science City.

=== Sponge City in Fenghuangcheng ===
The Fenghuangcheng area is located in the southeast of Guangming District, with an area of 24.6 square kilometers. There are six urban villages and 64 old industrial areas in the Fenghuangcheng area with weak water infrastructure leading to water pollution and waterlogging. Meanwhile, the ongoing construction of Guangming Science City has also brought more pressure on ecological protection in this area. Since April 2016, Guangming District has been exploring sponge city construction in the Fenghuangcheng area to create a nationwide sponge city model. After three years of exploration, the influent of the wastewater treatment plant in the Fenghuangcheng area increased by 94.1% in 2019, and effluent concentrations of CODcr, BOD5, and ammonia nitrogen increased by 145.6%, 113%, and 60.6%, respectively. The simulation model shows that the area achieves 72% annual runoff control and a 62% reduction in diffuse pollution (in terms of suspended matter). In addition, the water infrastructure, water pollution, and waterlogging problems were improved finally. Guangming District has formed a construction model for sponge cities that can be used as a reference for other cities.

Guangming Mode of Sponge City Construction

(1) Concept Promotion

To carry forward the concept of sponge city construction and stimulate the enthusiasm of all individuals to participate in the construction, Guangming District has given training programs for government departments, enterprises, communities, and schools.

(2) Master Plan

Guangming District has incorporated land development, urban renewal, urban village governance, and infrastructure construction into the master plan for sponge city construction with coordinated, systematic governance of the regional watershed. Meanwhile, a three-tier planning system covering 14 key industrial projects, industrial parks of over 2 million square meters, and three urban villages have been established. 47 kilometers of new greenways and 40 hectares of new coastal ecological space were added too.

(3) Problem-targeted Governance

To solve the problems of water pollution and waterlogging, Guangming District has focused on improving the network of rainwater and sewage diversions of the Fenghuangcheng area. A total of 69 residential communities, industrial zones, and 5 urban villages have been renovated, and the waterlogging problems of 6 sites have been completely solved. In addition, a new 282-kilometer-long sewage pipe network was added to eliminate water pollution in seven rivers.

(4) Strict Control on Construction Projects

The indexes of sponge city construction were included in the approval documents of government construction projects to establish a strict control management mechanism for the project.

(5) Strict Control on Public Sewer Users

A total of 417 Water Affair Authority staff were assigned to 31 communities to investigate and deal with users' malpractices in using public sewers.

(6) Resident-centered Working Mechanism

A resident-driven working mechanism was established to address the problems of combined sewerage systems, unregulated sewage, and sewage effluent in the urban village renovation.

(7) Tailored to Local Conditions

Establish a localized model calibration system to analyze water quality and quantity of 10 source control facilities, conduct online monitoring of trunk streams and tributary outfalls, and quantify the relationship between tasks and targets in 75 construction tasks.

(8) Comprehensively Promote the Sponge City Construction

In addition to water pollution control, Guangming District is committed to reducing air pollution, creating urban green spaces, and protecting the natural environment

== Subdistricts ==
Name	Chinese (S)	Hanyu Pinyin	Canton Romanization	Population (2020)	Area (km^{2})
Guangming Subdistrict	光明街道	Guāngmíng Jiēdào	guong1 ming4 gai1 dou6	According to the data of the seventh census, the resident population of Guangming District was 1,095,289 on November 1, 2020.	156.1
Gongming Subdistrict	公明街道	Gōngmíng Jiēdào	gung1 ming4 gai1 dou6	According to the data of the seventh census, the resident population of Guangming District was 1,095,289 on November 1, 2020.	156.1
Xinhu Subdistrict	新湖街道	Xīnhú Jiēdào	sen1 wu4 gai1 dou6	According to the data of the seventh census, the resident population of Guangming District was 1,095,289 on November 1, 2020.	156.1
Fenghuang Subdistrict	凤凰街道	Fènghuáng Jiēdào	fung6 wong4 gai1 dou6	According to the data of the seventh census, the resident population of Guangming District was 1,095,289 on November 1, 2020.	156.1
Yutang Subdistrict	玉塘街道	Yùtáng Jiēdào	yug6 tong4 gai1 dou6	According to the data of the seventh census, the resident population of Guangming District was 1,095,289 on November 1, 2020.	156.1
Matian Subdistrict	马田街道	Mǎtián Jiēdào	ma5 tin4 gai1 dou6	According to the data of the seventh census, the resident population of Guangming District was 1,095,289 on November 1, 2020.	156.1

== Geography ==
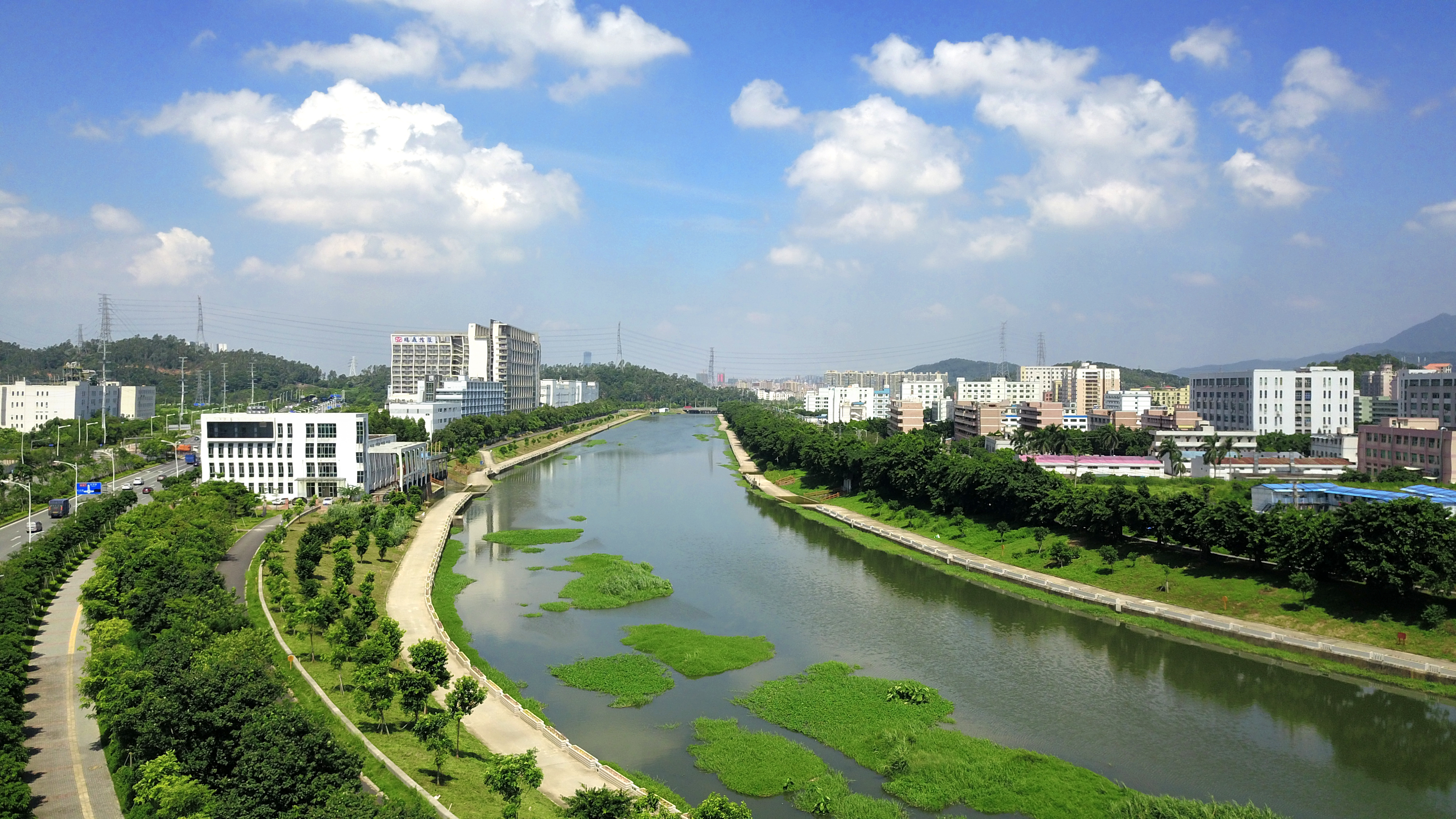
The main streams and tributaries of Maozhou River are planned as major ecological corridors.

Guangming District is located northwest of Shenzhen City, Guangdong Province, east to Guanlan, west to Songgang, south to Shiyan, and north to Dongguan City. The center of Guangming District is located in 22°46′34″N, 113°54′44″E.

=== Climate ===
Guangming District has a humid subtropical climate with an average temperature of 23 °C.

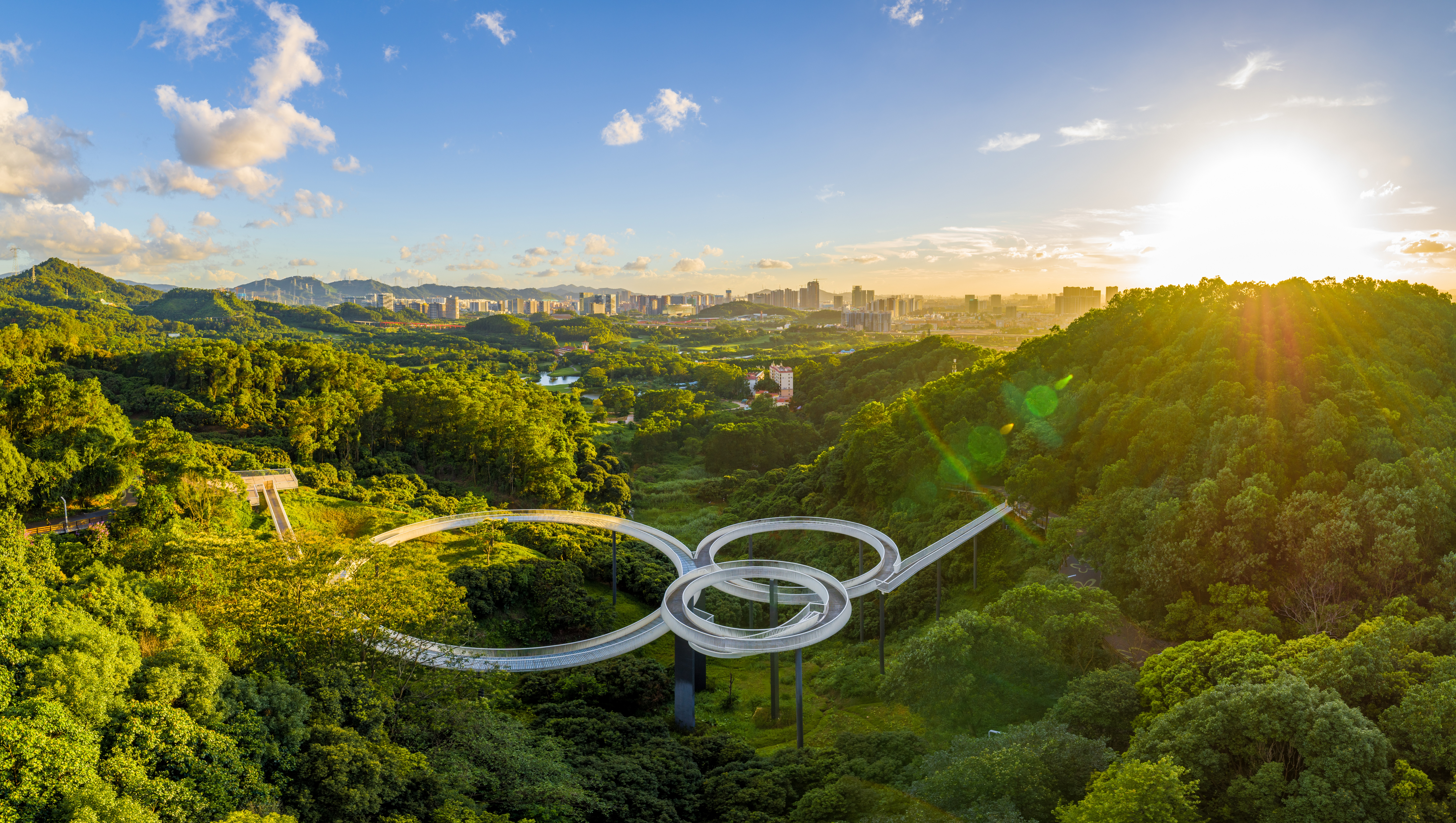
Urban greenways

=== Natural Resources ===
Guangming District is rich in ecological resources, including mountains, rivers, forests, fields, and lakes. Several ecological nodes such as parks, wetland parks, local reservoirs, and farmlands have been built, while the main streams and tributaries of the Maozhou River and urban greenways are planned as major ecological corridors and the eastern and northern forests as ecological reserves. Guangming District has the largest contiguous developable area in Shenzhen, with 53% of the total land area covered by green areas.

== Economy ==
Guangming District creates a "3 + 1" industrial system dominated by intelligent industries, new materials industry, and life science industry and supported by the characteristic service industry, and introduces "1 + 4 + N" industrial policy to lead the region's industrial pattern reshaping. So far, there are more than 1,000 large-scale industrial enterprises and national high-tech enterprises in the region, five enterprises with an annual output value of more than 10 billion yuan, and 21 local listed companies. In 2020, Guangming District achieved a regional GDP of 110.77 billion yuan, an increase of 5.7%, with a growth rate ranking second in Shenzhen City. The value-added industry above the scale completed 67.783 billion yuan, an increase of 6.6%, with the growth rate ranking first in Shenzhen. The fixed asset investment completed 79.046 billion yuan, an increase of 27.6%, with the growth rate ranking first in the city. The total retail sales of social consumer goods achieved 19.626 billion yuan, an increase of 0.2%, with the growth rate ranking second in the city. (The above rankings do not include Shenzhen Shantou Cooperation Zone)

=== Industrial Parks ===
Merchant Wisdom City

Merchant Wisdom City, covering an area of about 200,000 square meters, is a strategic cooperation project between the China Merchants Group and the Shenzhen Municipal Government, and a Sino-German cooperation platform in cooperation with the Shenzhen Investment Development Bureau to promote cooperation between enterprises in Merchant Wisdom City and outstanding German enterprises. Merchant Wisdom City is an industrial community focusing on emerging industries such as intelligent manufacturing, biomedicine, new materials, and electronic information.

Yunzhi Science Park

Located in Dongmudun of the Guangming Science Park, Yunzhi Science Park mainly serves R&D factories, businesses, and related facilities with an area of around 60,000 square meters.

Evoc Science and Technology Park

Evoc Science and Technology Park is a modern and high-quality technology industrial park brought by Evoc Intelligent Technology, including six functional areas: top office building, R&D center, recreation area, catering area, apartments, and condominiums. It covers an area of about 80,000 square meters.

Famous Enterprises

- SZZT Electronics
- Wanhe Innovation Drugs R&D and Industrial Base
- Shenzhen Selen Science and Technology Co., Ltd.

== Education ==
Since its establishment, Guangming District has made great efforts to introduce prestigious resources for basic education. In 2019 alone, 4 new public kindergartens were built, and 4 new publicly funded kindergartens were added, with the sum of public kindergartens and publicly funded kindergartens accounting for 87.7% of the total. 5 new primary and secondary schools were renovated, and 9,540 public primary and middle school seats were added, with the supply rate of public primary one and junior high one school seats reaching 78% and 100%, respectively. Shenzhen Experimental School - Guangming Campus opened, providing education services from kindergarten to high school. The construction of the elementary school affiliated to Educational Science Research Institute of Shenzhen and Guangming Xinghe Primary School affiliated to South China Normal University is in full swing.

Guangming Science City has also introduced higher education resources, such as the Shenzhen Campus of Sun Yat-sen University, Shenzhen Institute of Advanced Technology Chinese Academy of Sciences, and other research universities, providing strong support for the construction of a comprehensive national science center and the international science and technology innovation center in the Guangdong-Hong Kong-Macao Greater Bay Area.

Schools operated by the Shenzhen Municipal Government

- Shenzhen No. 2 Vocational School of Technology (深圳市第二职业技术学校) - It has boarding facilities
- Shenzhen Yuxin School (深圳市育新学校), previously known as the Shenzhen Work-Study School - Guangming Subdistrict

== Culture ==
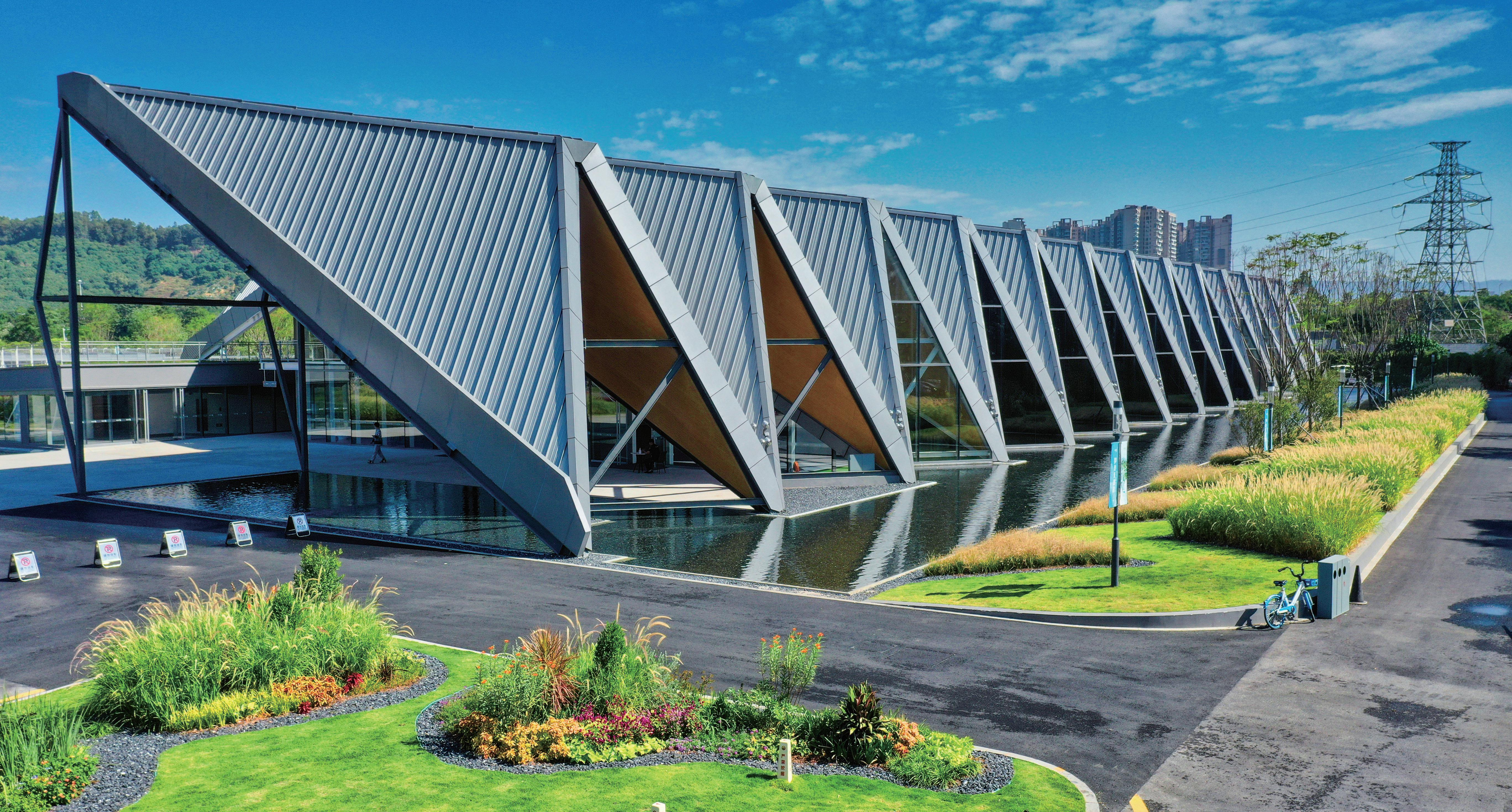
Zuoan Technology Park

Famous Buildings

- Guangming District Library
- Xiwu Museum
- International Leisure Culture Museum of XDS
- EBOHR Watch Culture Museum
- Zuoan Technology Park
- Guangming Culture and Art Center

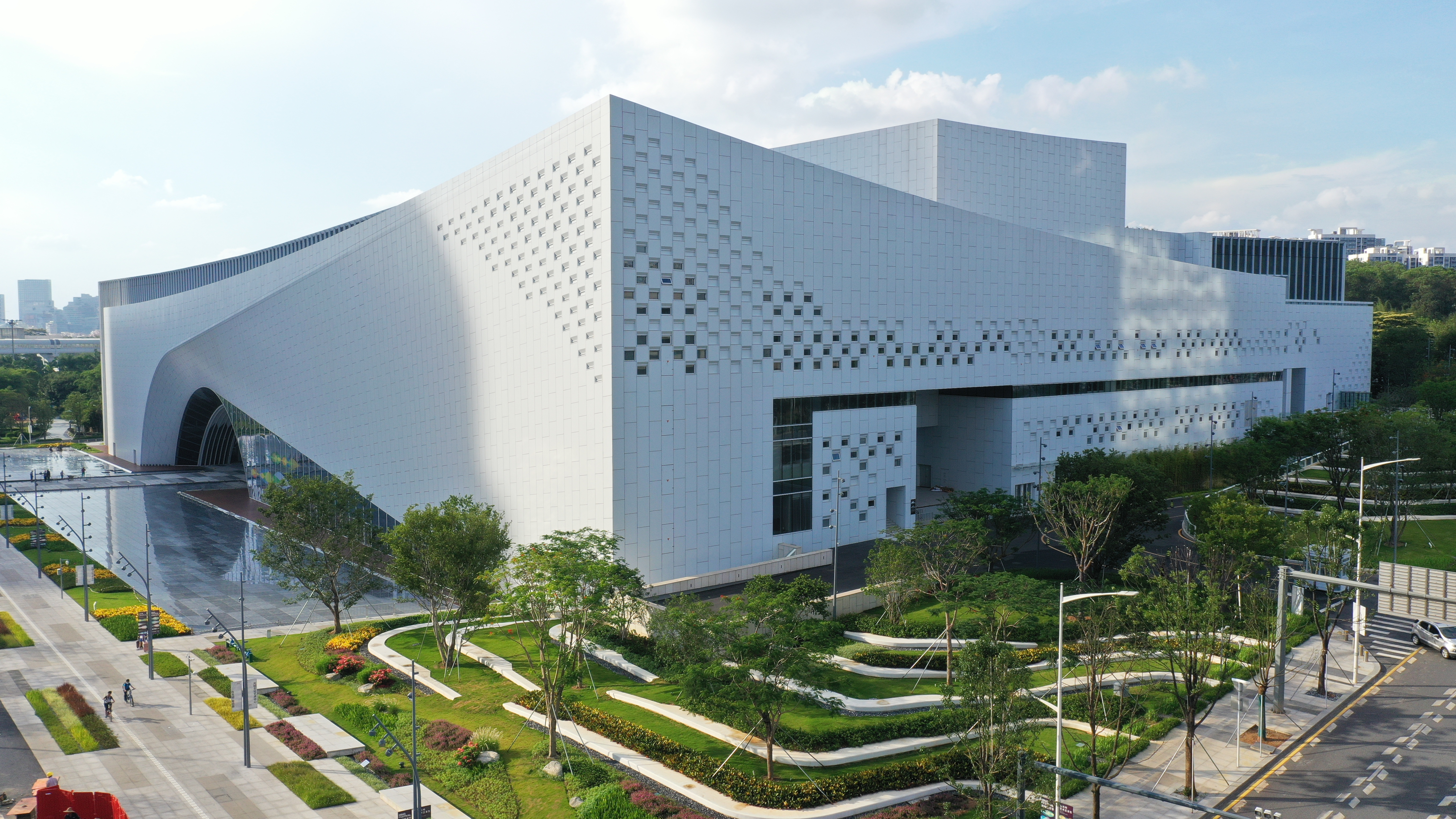
Guangming Culture and Art Center

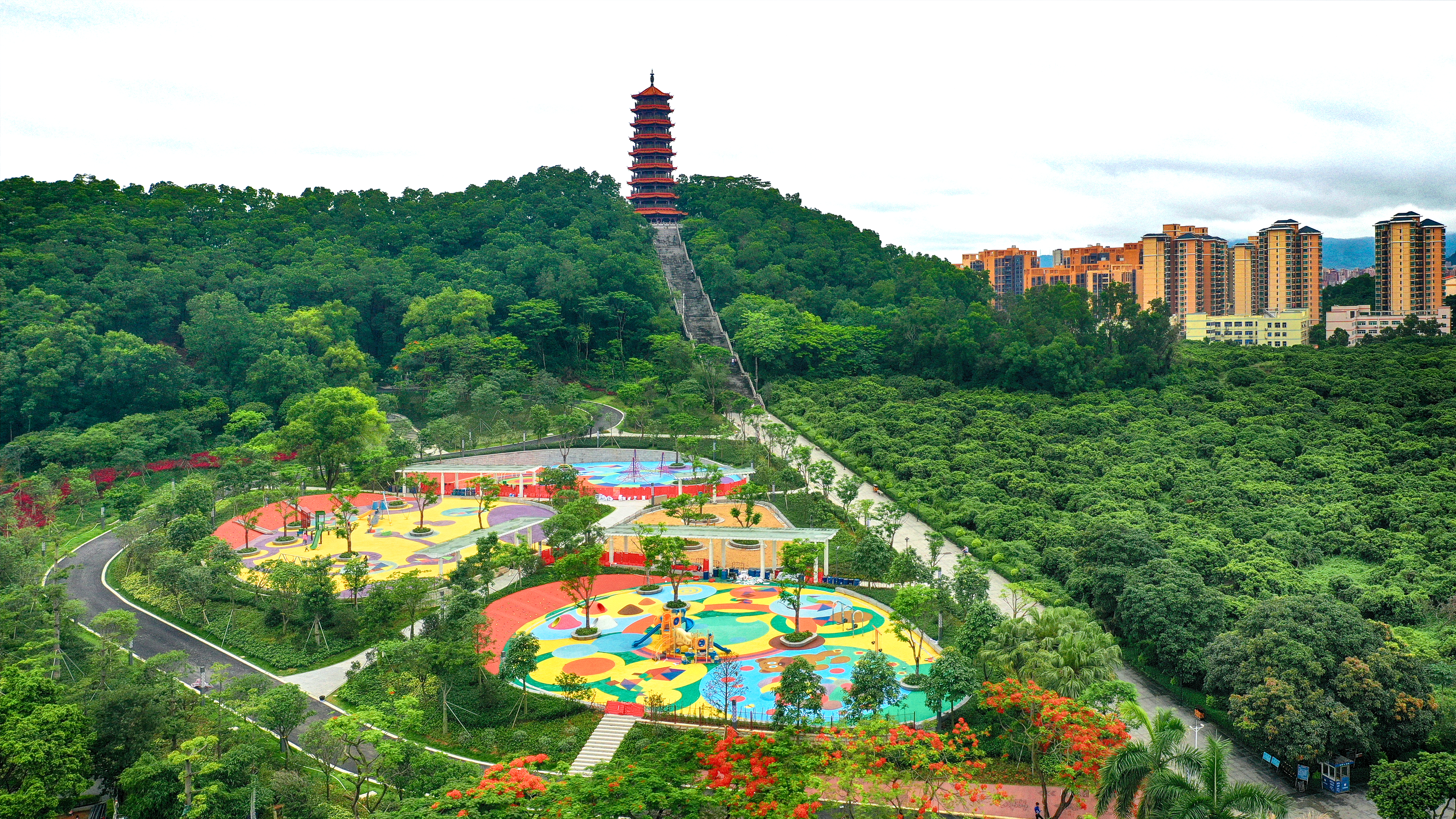
Honghua Hill Park

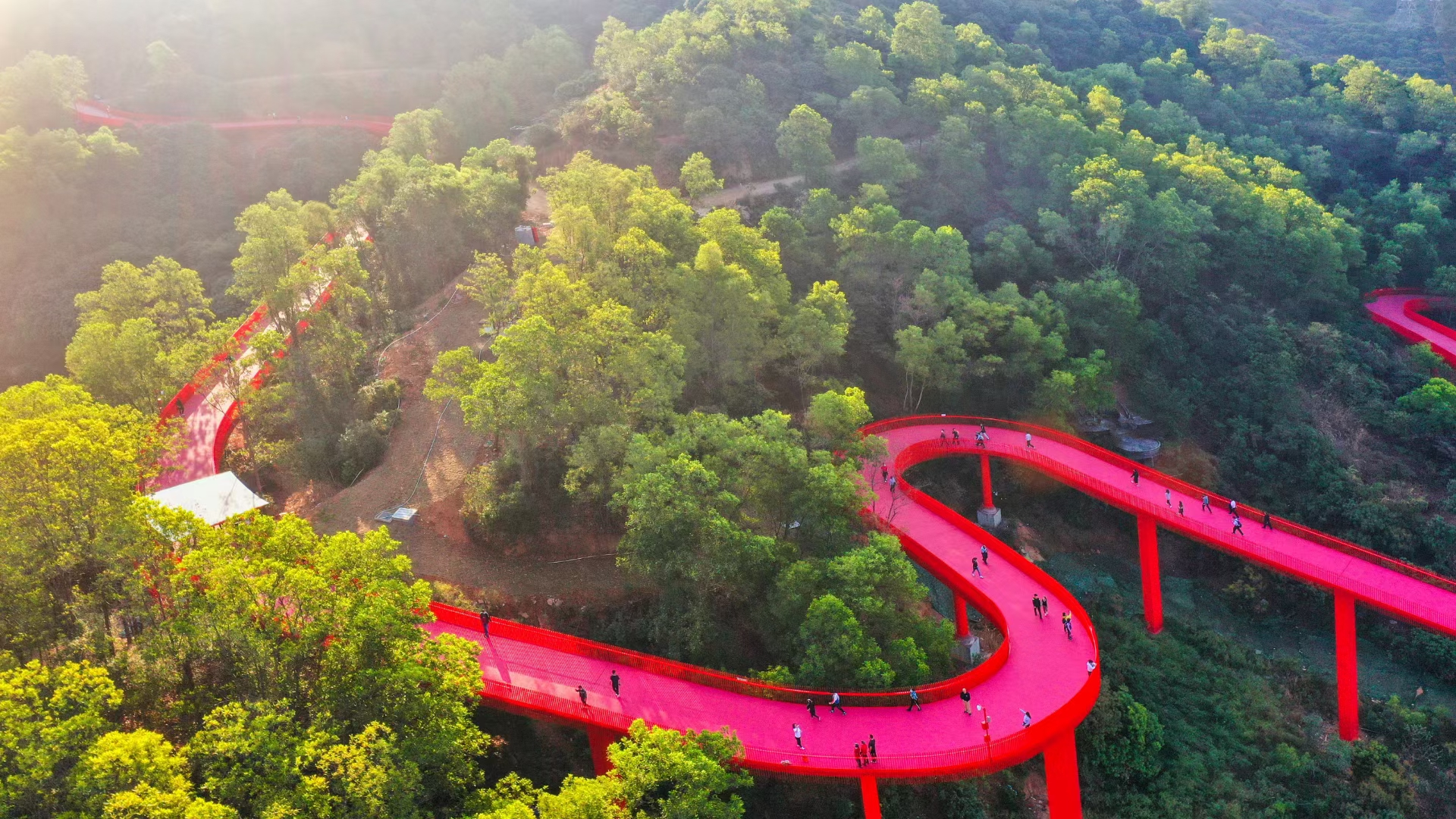
Hongqiao Park

Tourist Sites

- Guangming Sightseeing Cow Farm
- Mai Clan Ancestral Tomb Complex
- Honghua Hill Park
- Hongqiao Park

== Transportation ==
The district is served by Guangmingcheng railway station on the Guangzhou–Shenzhen–Hong Kong Express Rail Link and Line 6 of the Shenzhen Metro.

High-Speed Railways

- Guangzhou-Shenzhen-Hong Kong Express Rail Link
- Guangxi-Shenzhen Express Railway
- Shenzhen-Dongguan Intercity Railway

Metro

Shenzhen Metro Line 6 has a station in Guangming District. In addition, Shenzhen Metro Line 13 passing through the district is under construction.

Main Roads

- S31 Longda Expressways
- S33 Nanguang Expressways
- S86 Shenzhen Outer Ring Expressway
- G228 National Highway
- X252 County Road
- X259 County Road

== Major events ==
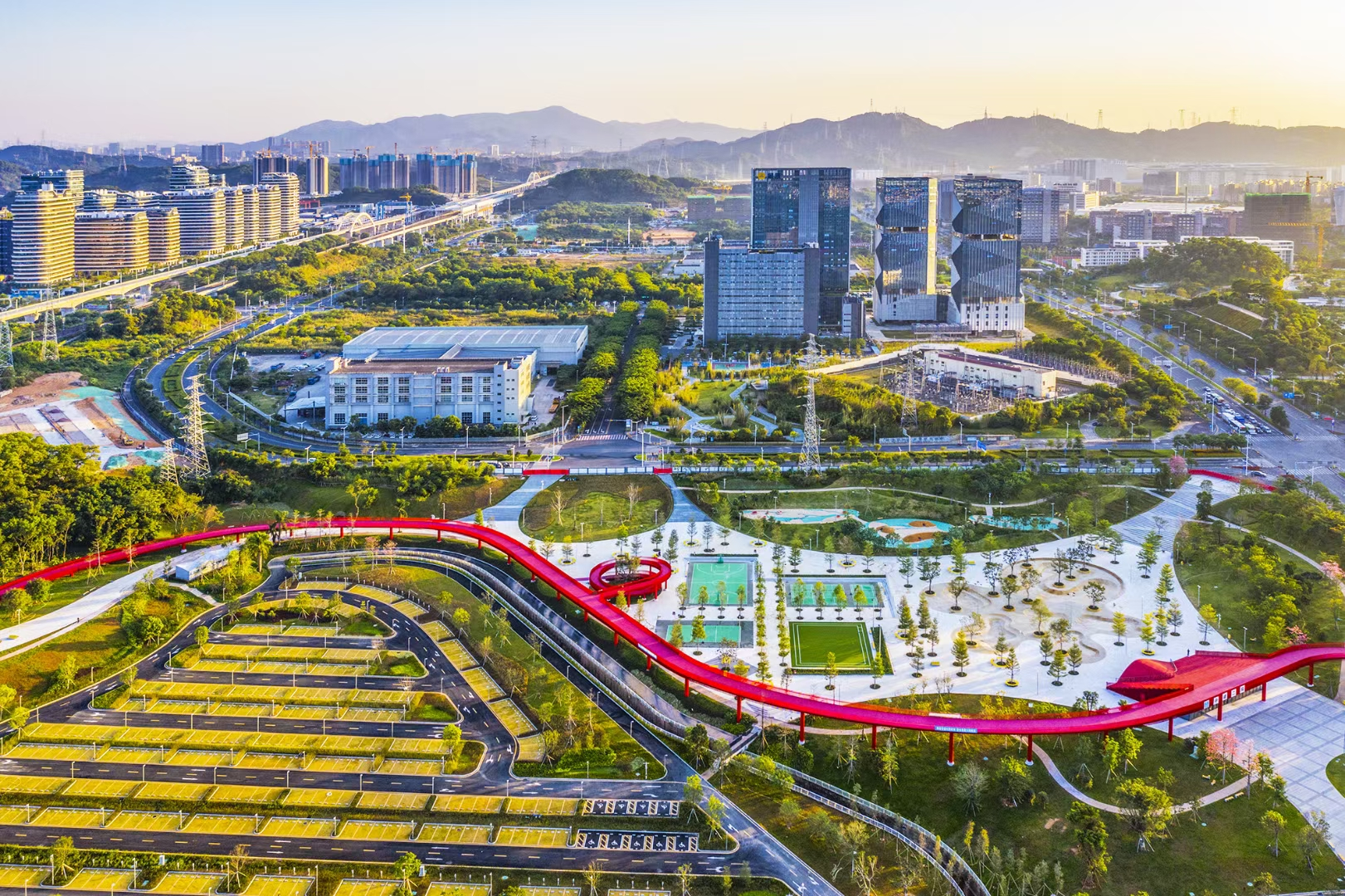
Hongqiao Park across Guangming District

Guangming District Celebrates 3rd Anniversary

On September 19, 2021, Guangming District celebrated its third anniversary. In the past three years, Guangming District has devoted itself to promoting the construction of Guangming Science City in order to promote applied basic research and enhance original innovation capabilities. Guangming District has also made considerable achievements in humanities and livability and urban ecological construction.

SZTU, Guangming District Sign Basic Education Cooperation

On August 26, 2021, Shenzhen Technology University (SZTU) and Guangming District signed a basic education cooperation agreement from kindergarten to high school, which marked the formal establishment of a strategic partnership between SZTU and the Guangming District Government to promote quality basic education.

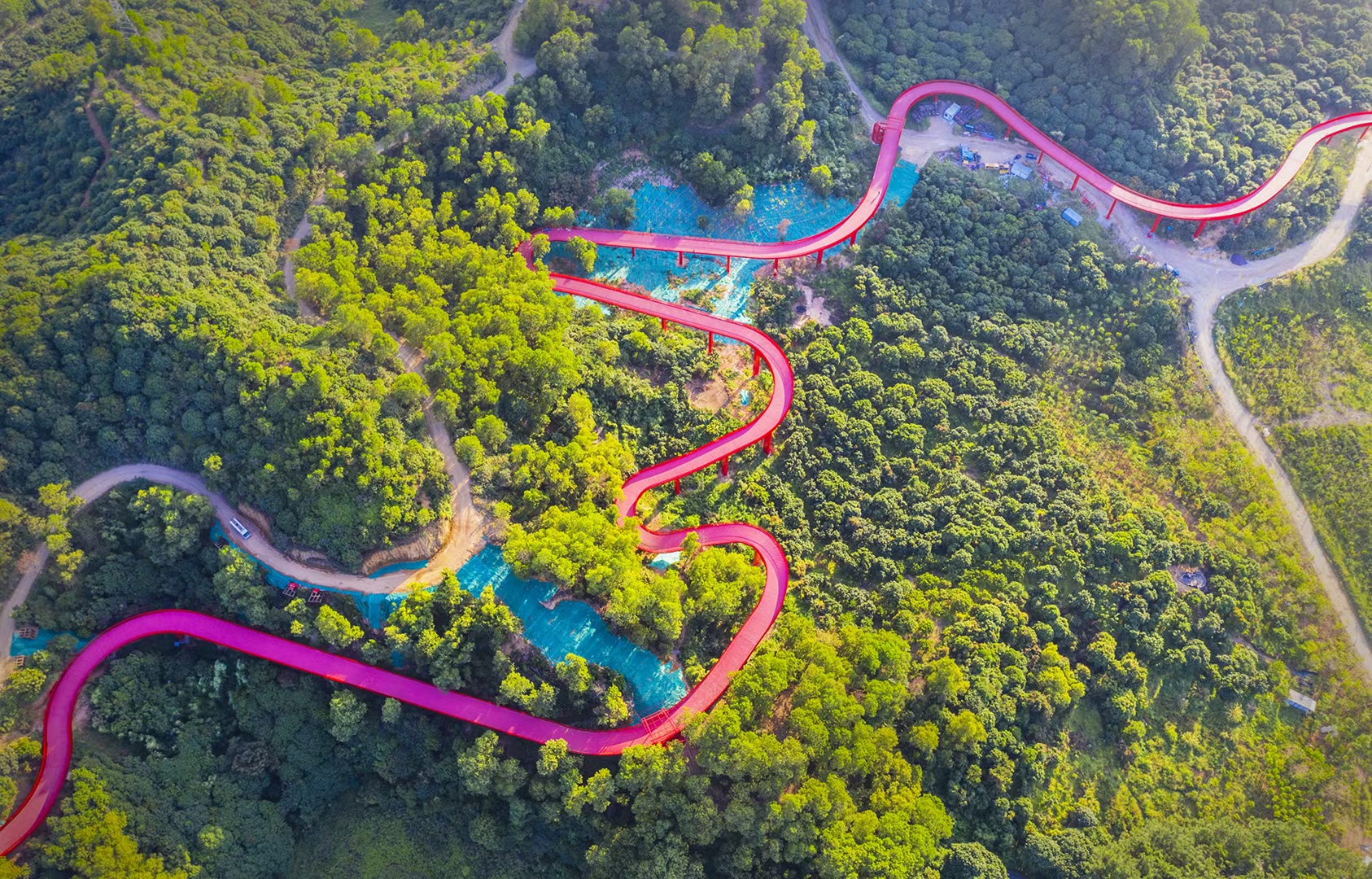
Hong Qiao

Hongqiao Park is Open to the Public

On November 27, 2020, Hongqiao Park was officially unveiled at the opening ceremony of the 2020 Shenzhen Park Culture Season. On December 1 of the same year, Hongqiao Park won the "Best Landscape Design of the Year Award" in the first "World Architecture Festival – China" held in Chengdu City, China.

Shenzhen-Hong Kong-Macau Science and Technology Achievement Transfer Base is Established

On July 31, 2020, the first Shenzhen-Hong Kong-Macau Science and Technology Achievement Transfer Base in Guangming District was officially inaugurated in Huaqiang Creative Industrial Park. This is the first primary project in Fenghuangcheng of Guangming District, which is considered the "Strategic Park for Global Investment Promotion."

Landslide

A major landslide occurred in Hengtaiyu Industrial Park, Guangming District, on December 20, 2015. As of 21 December, it results in one death, 76 people missing and 16 hospitalizations. Waste materials generated from nearby construction works piled up into a hill which collapsed and consequently destroyed 33 buildings, the mud and debris covered an area greater than ten hectares (25 acres).

Immediately after the accident, Shenzhen City and Guangming New District activated the rescue emergency plan. Chinese authorities had over 2,906 rescue personnel, including approximately 800 from the National Defense Force, on the scene to fully carry out rescue work. On December 26, 2015, a silent mourning ceremony was held in Guangming New District for the accident victims. For the 4,630 employees of the companies affected by this accident, all of them have been resettled by December 30, 2015. As of January 6, 2016, the families of the 19 victims have completed the signing of the compassionate agreement. On May 5, 2017, the public sentencing of the 26 personnel directly responsible for the Landside Accident and 19 defendants was held, and more than 40 people were sentenced.
