= Biyan station =

Shenzhen Metro Line 6 Branch station

Biyan 碧眼
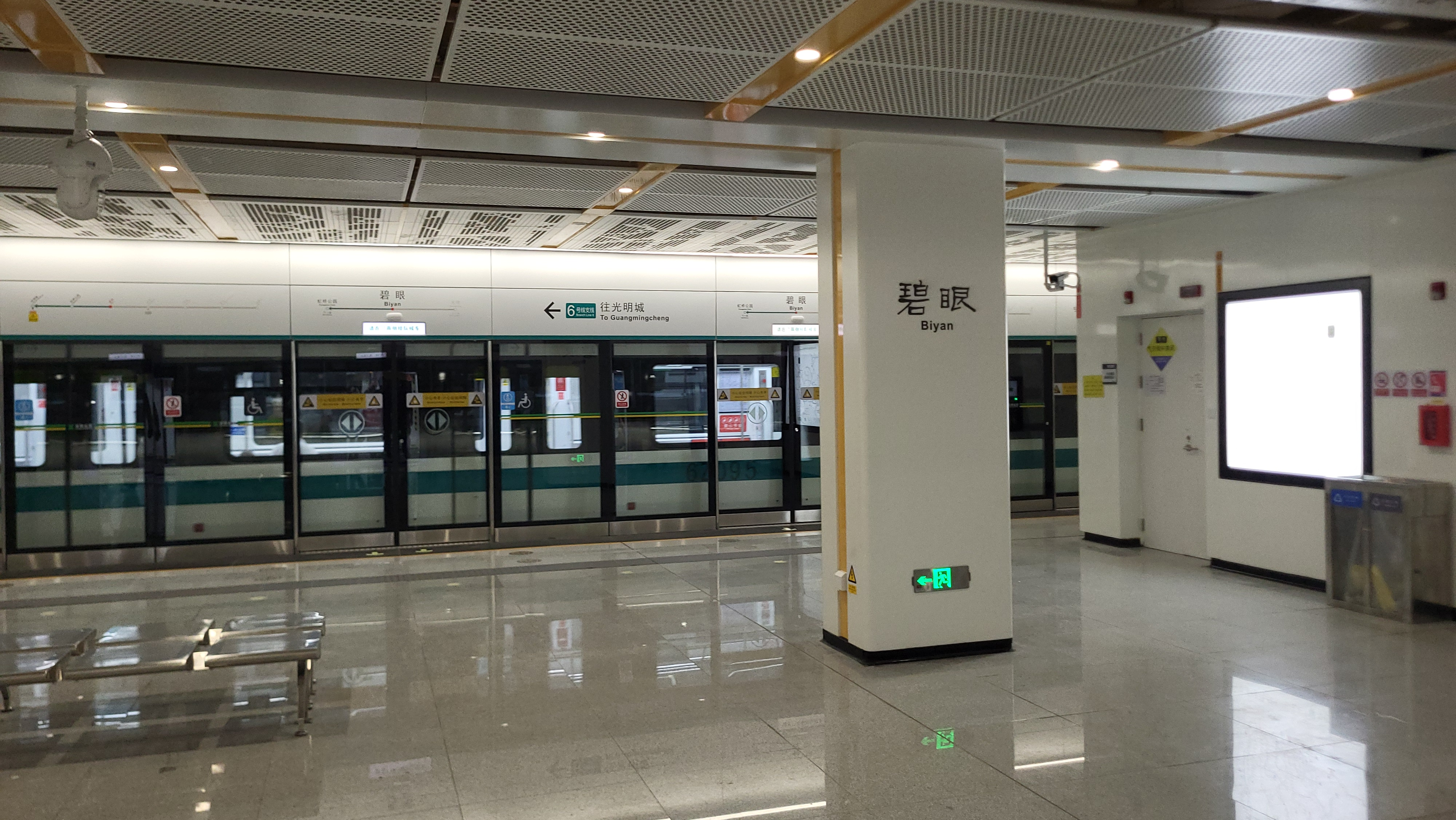
- Platform

Chinese name
- Chinese: 碧眼
Transcriptions
Standard Mandarin
- Hanyu Pinyin: Bìyǎn
Yue: Cantonese
- Yale Romanization: Bīkngáan
- Jyutping: Bik1ngaan5

General information
- Location: Guangming Subdistrict, Guangming District, Shenzhen, Guangdong; China
- Operated by: SZMC (Shenzhen Metro Group)
- Line: Line 6 Branch
- Platforms: 2 (1 island platform)
- Tracks: 2

Construction
- Structure type: Underground
- Accessible: Yes

History
- Opened: 28 September 2025 (9 months ago)

Services
Preceding station	Shenzhen Metro	Following station
Guangming towards SUAT	Line 6 Branch	Hongqiao Park towards Guangmingcheng
Location

Biyan station (Chinese: 碧眼; pinyin: Bìyǎn Zhàn; Cantonese Yale: Bīkngáan Jaahm), is a station on Line 6 Branch of Shenzhen Metro. It opened on 28 September 2025, and is located in Guangming Subdistrict in Guangming District.

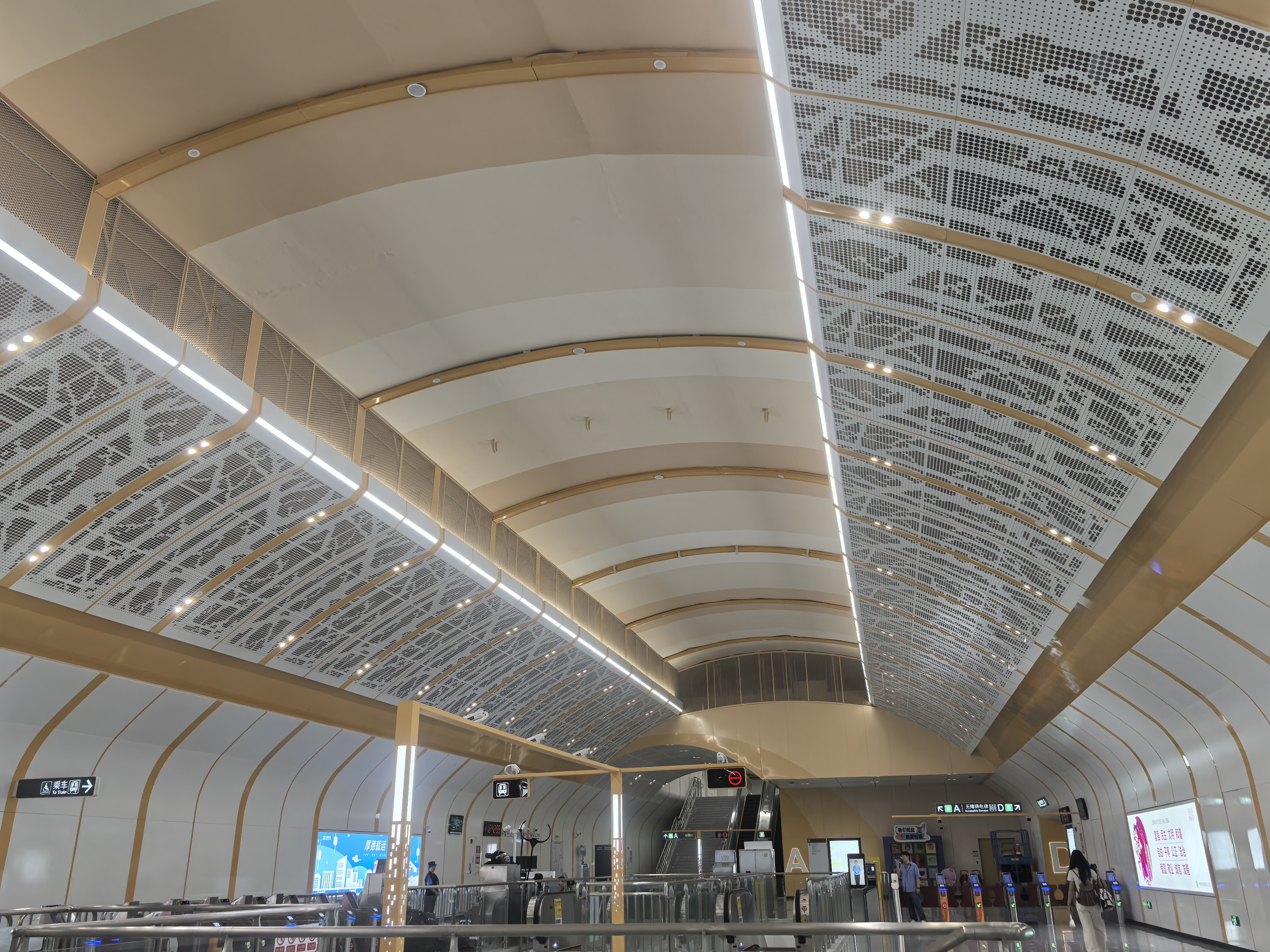
Concourse

== Station layout ==
G	-	Exits A-D
B1F; Concourse	Lobby	Ticket Machines, Customer Service
B2F; Platforms		6B towards Guangmingcheng (Hongqiao Park)
B2F; Platforms	Island platform, doors will open on the left
B2F; Platforms		6B towards SUAT (Guangming)

=== Entrances/exits ===
The station has 4 points of entry/exit. Exits B and D are equipped with elevators. Exit C has a toilet.

- : Guangqiao Road (E-S), Biguo Road (S), Zhutang Road (N)
- : Guangqiao Road (E-N), Sports Park Road (S)
- : Guangqiao Road (W-N), Guangming Street
- : Guangqiao Road (W-S)
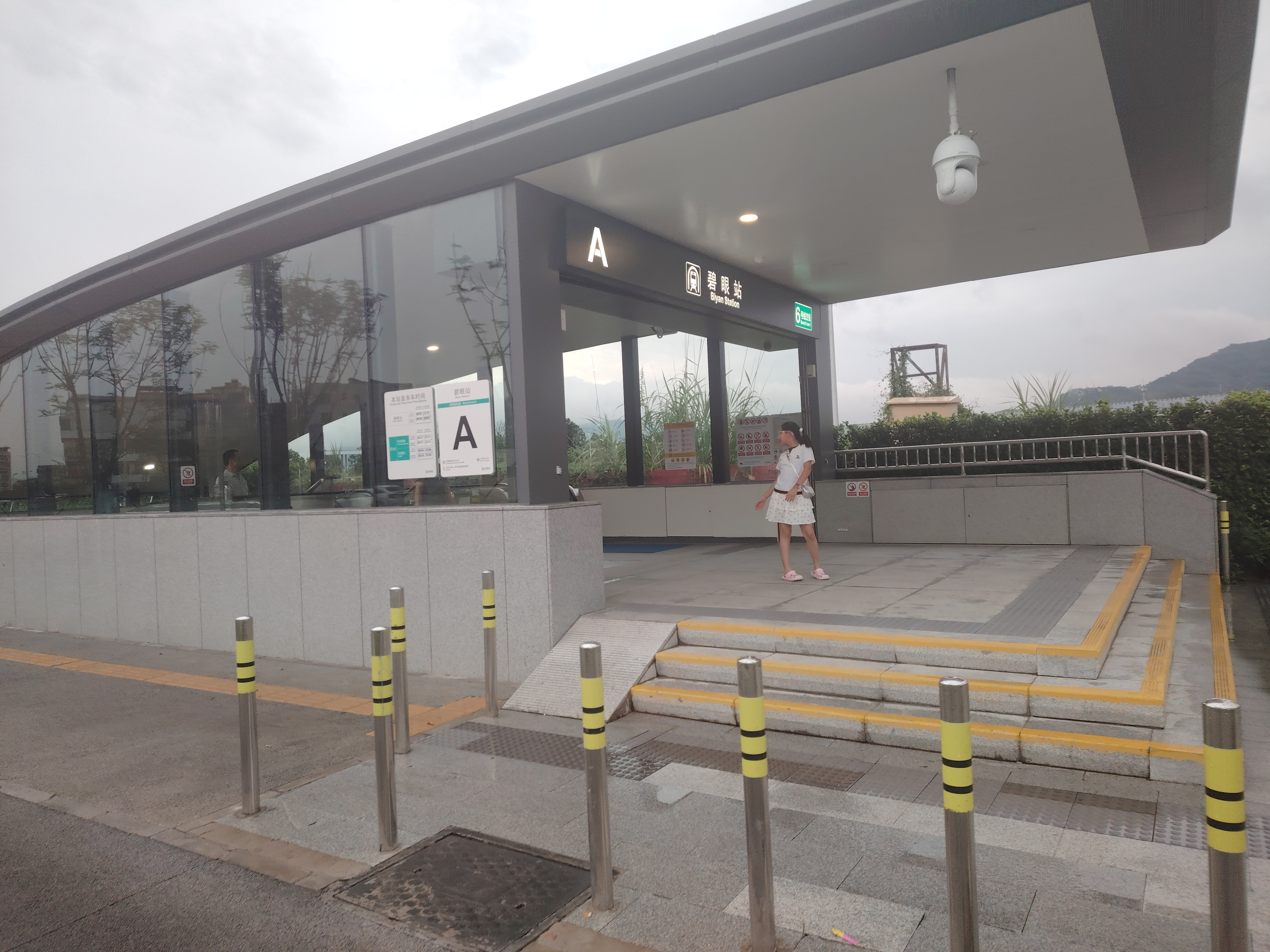
Entrance A

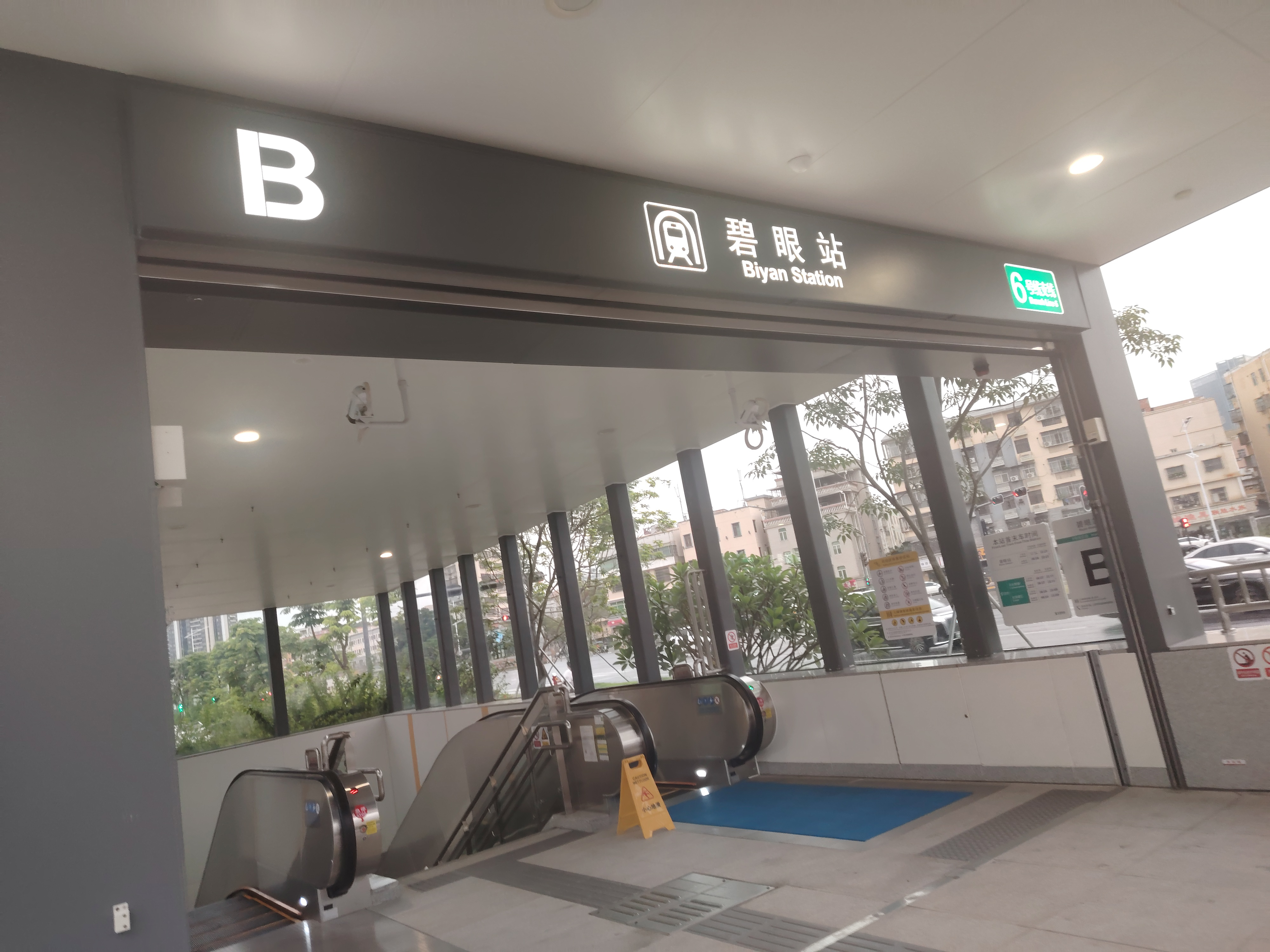
Entrance B

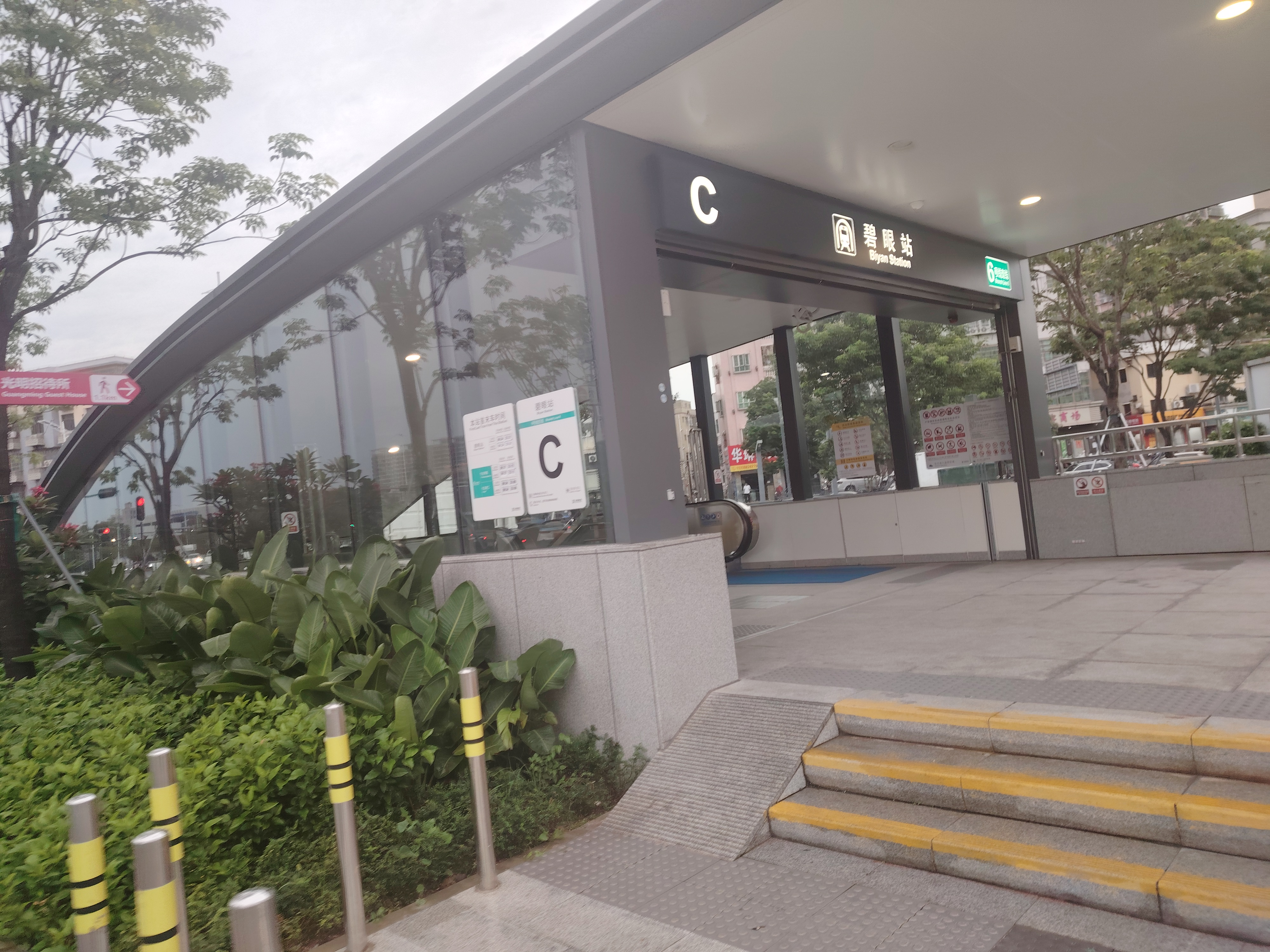
Entrance C

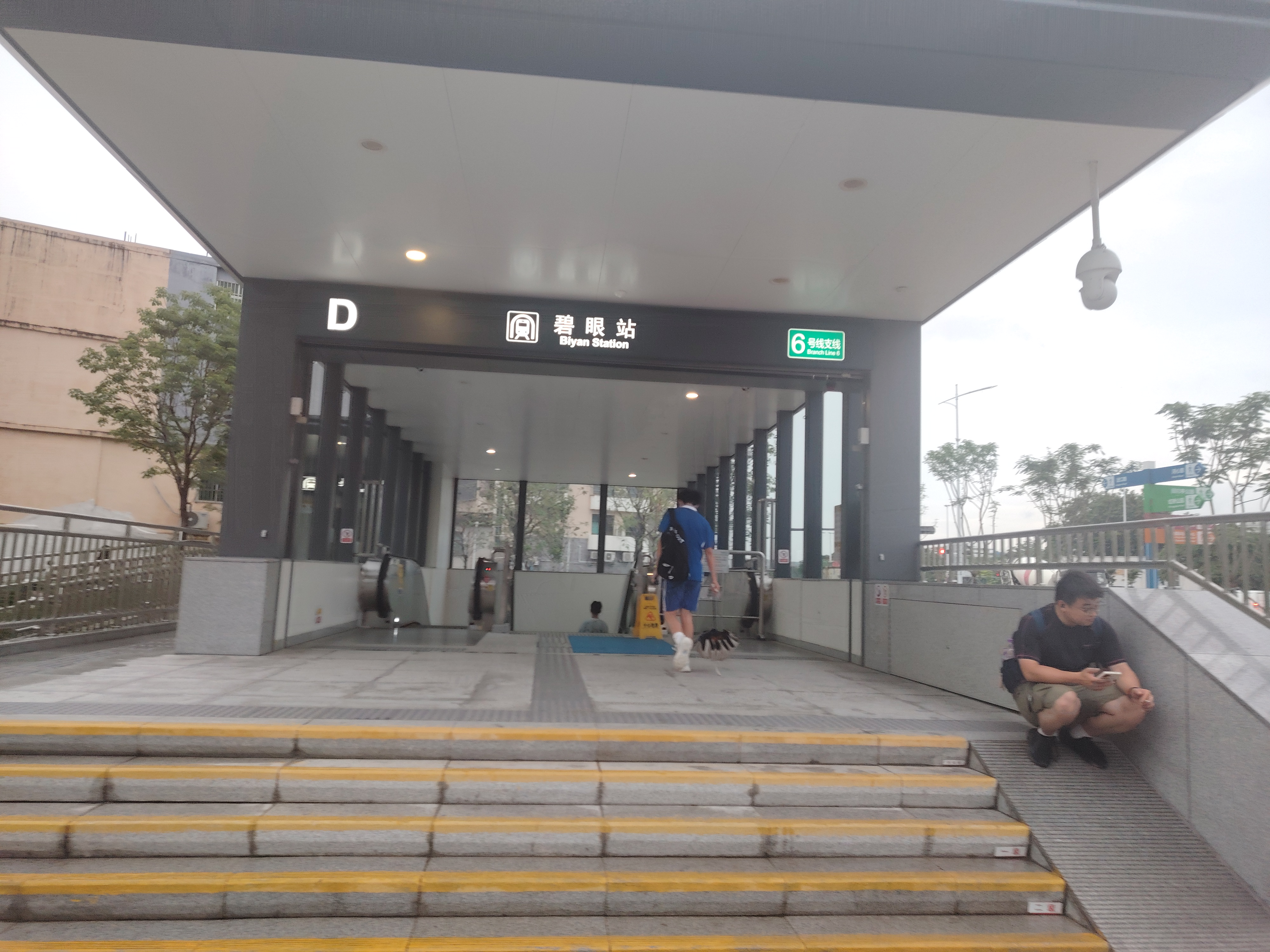
Entrance D
