= Hongqiao Park station =

Shenzhen Metro Line 6 Branch station

Hongqiao Park 虹桥公园
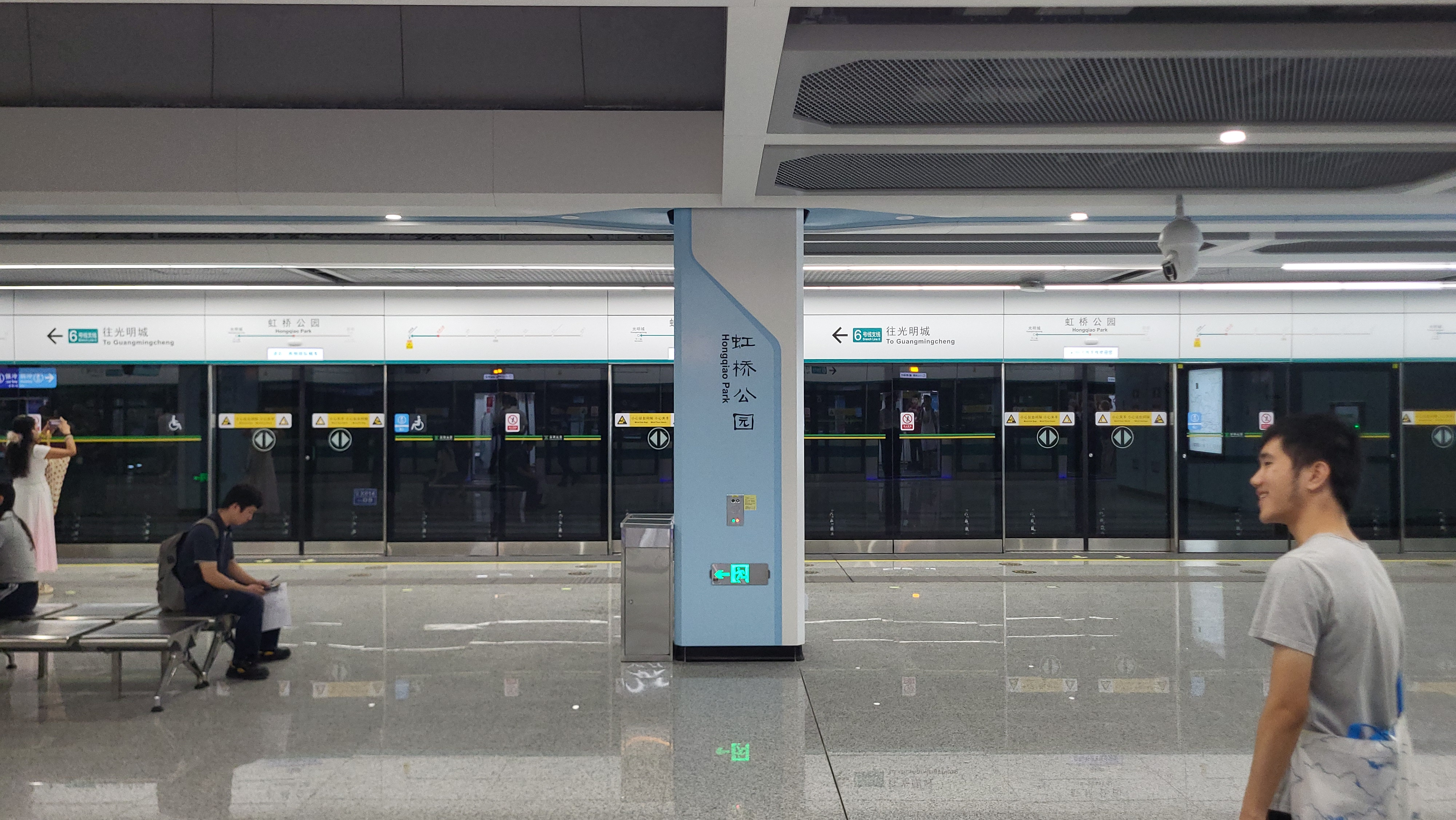
- Platform

Chinese name
- Traditional Chinese: 虹橋公園
- Simplified Chinese: 虹桥公园
Transcriptions
Standard Mandarin
- Hanyu Pinyin: Hóngqiáo Gōngyuán
Yue: Cantonese
- Yale Romanization: Hùhngkìuh Gūng'yún
- Jyutping: Hung4kiu4 Gung1jyun4

General information
- Location: Northeast side of the intersection of Guangqiao Road (光侨路) and Huaxia Road (华夏路); Guangming Subdistrict, Guangming District, Shenzhen, Guangdong; China
- Coordinates: 22°45′12″N 113°56′43″E
- Operated by: SZMC (Shenzhen Metro Group)
- Line: Line 6 Branch
- Platforms: 2 (1 island platform)
- Tracks: 2

Construction
- Structure type: Underground
- Accessible: Yes

History
- Opened: 28 September 2025 (9 months ago)

Services
Preceding station	Shenzhen Metro	Following station
Biyan towards SUAT	Line 6 Branch	Guangmingcheng Terminus
Location

Hongqiao Park station (simplified Chinese: 虹桥公园; traditional Chinese: 虹橋公園; pinyin: Hóngqiáo Gōngyuán Zhàn; Cantonese Yale: Hùhngkìuh Gūng'yún Jaahm), is a station on Line 6 Branch of Shenzhen Metro. It opened on 28 September 2025, and is located in Guangming Subdistrict in Guangming District.

== Station layout ==
G	-	Exits A-D
B1F; Concourse	Lobby	Ticket Machines, Customer Service, Toilets
B2F; Platforms		6B towards Guangmingcheng (terminus)
B2F; Platforms	Island platform, doors will open on the left
B2F; Platforms		6B towards SUAT (Biyan)

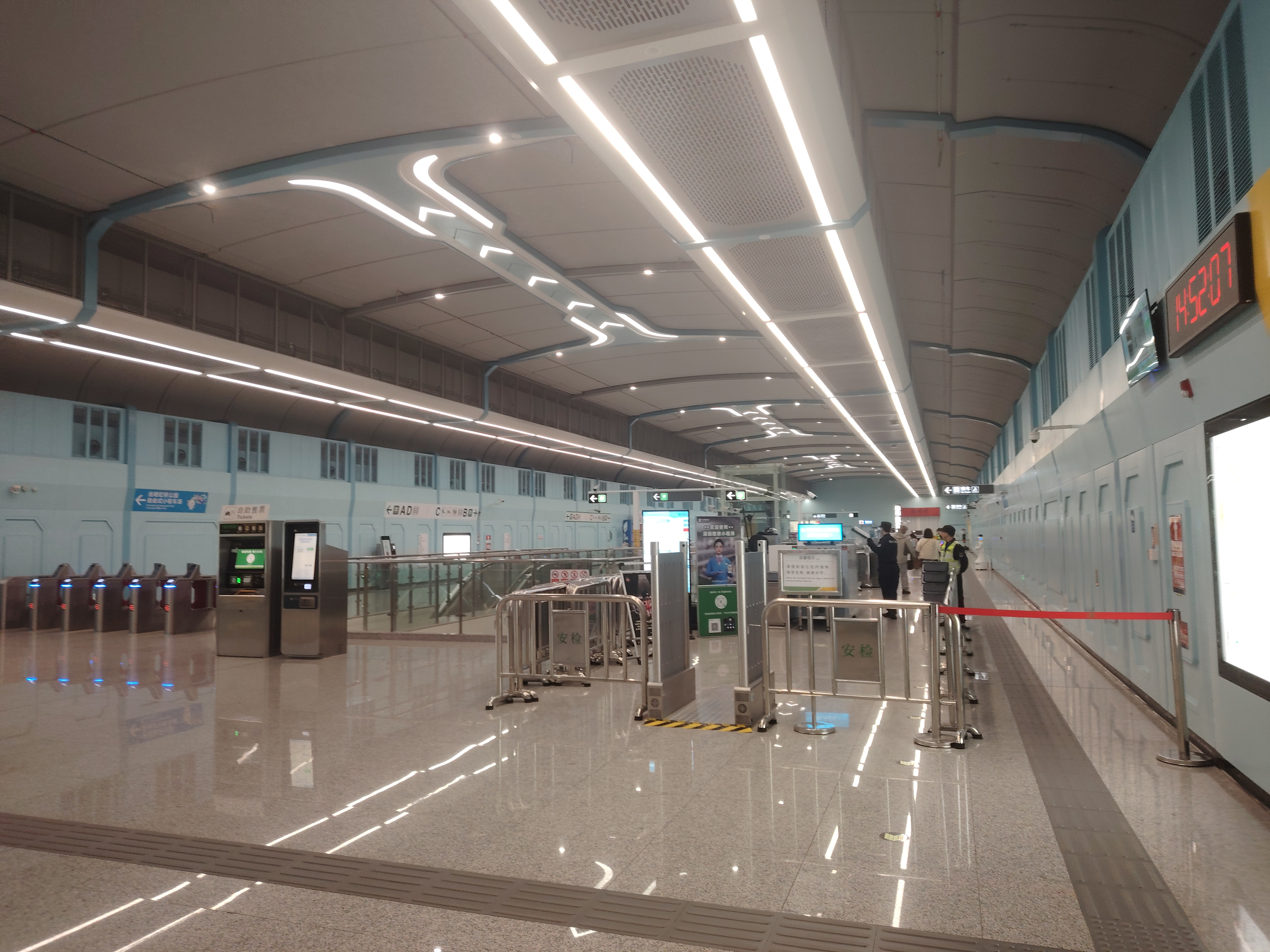
Concourse

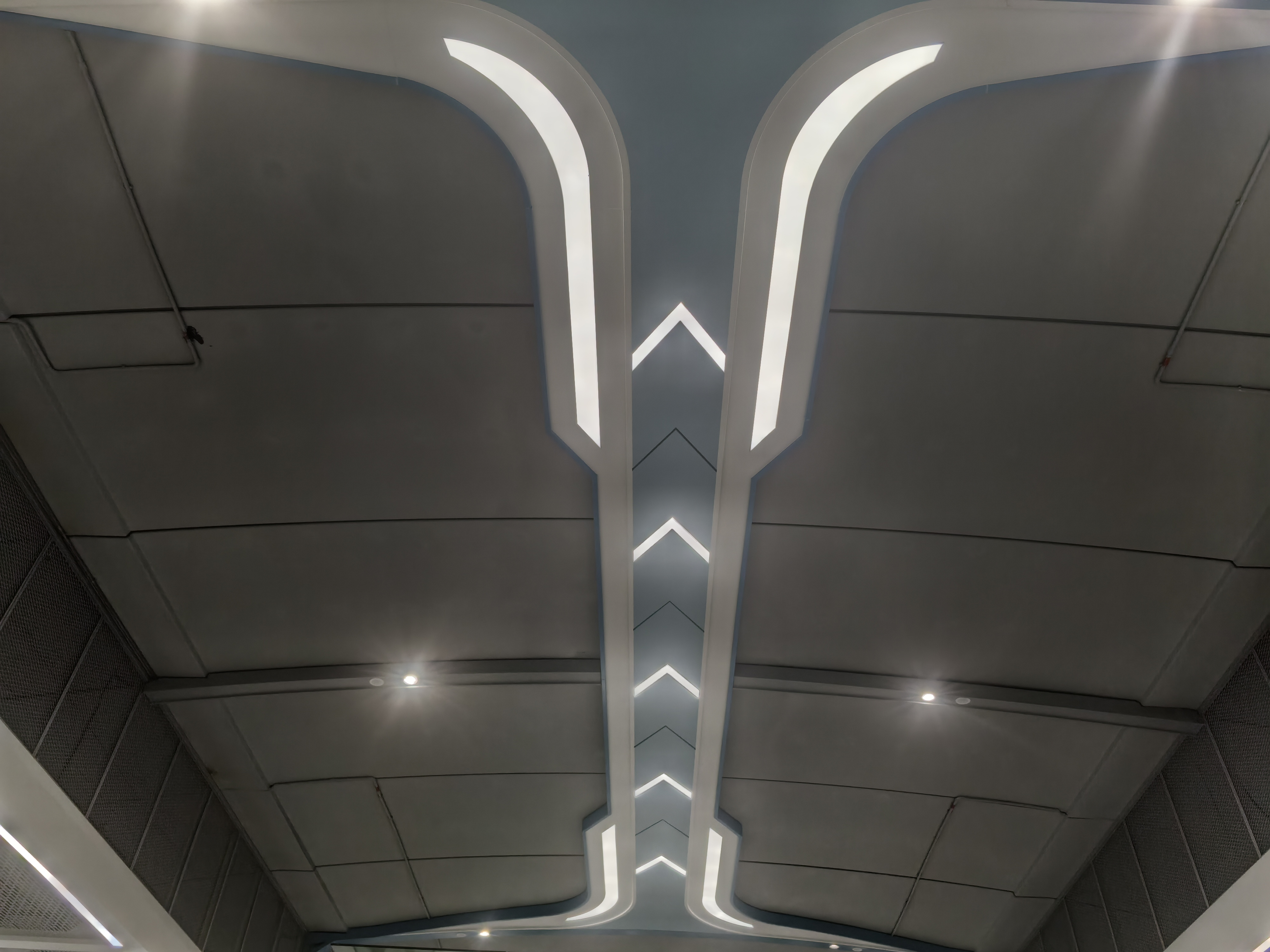
Station lighting

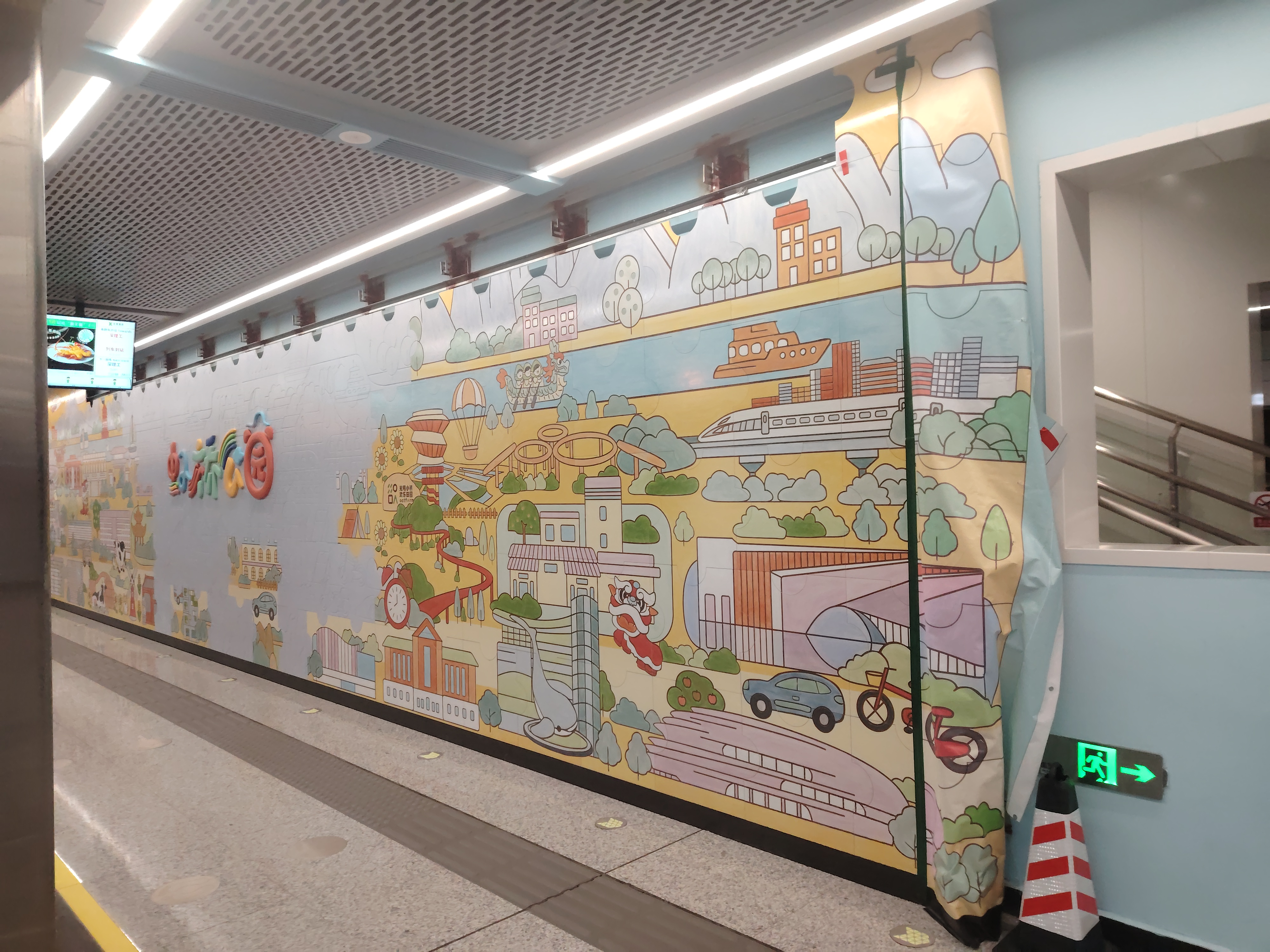
Platform art wall

=== Entrances/exits ===
The station has 4 points of entry/exit. Exit B is equipped with an elevator and a toilet.

- : Guangqiao Road (E-S), Hongqiao Park
- : Guangqiao Road (E-N), Mianqian Road (S)
- : Guangqiao Road (W-N), Huaxia Road (N), Hexin Road (S)
- : Guangqiao Road (W-S), Huaxia Road (S)
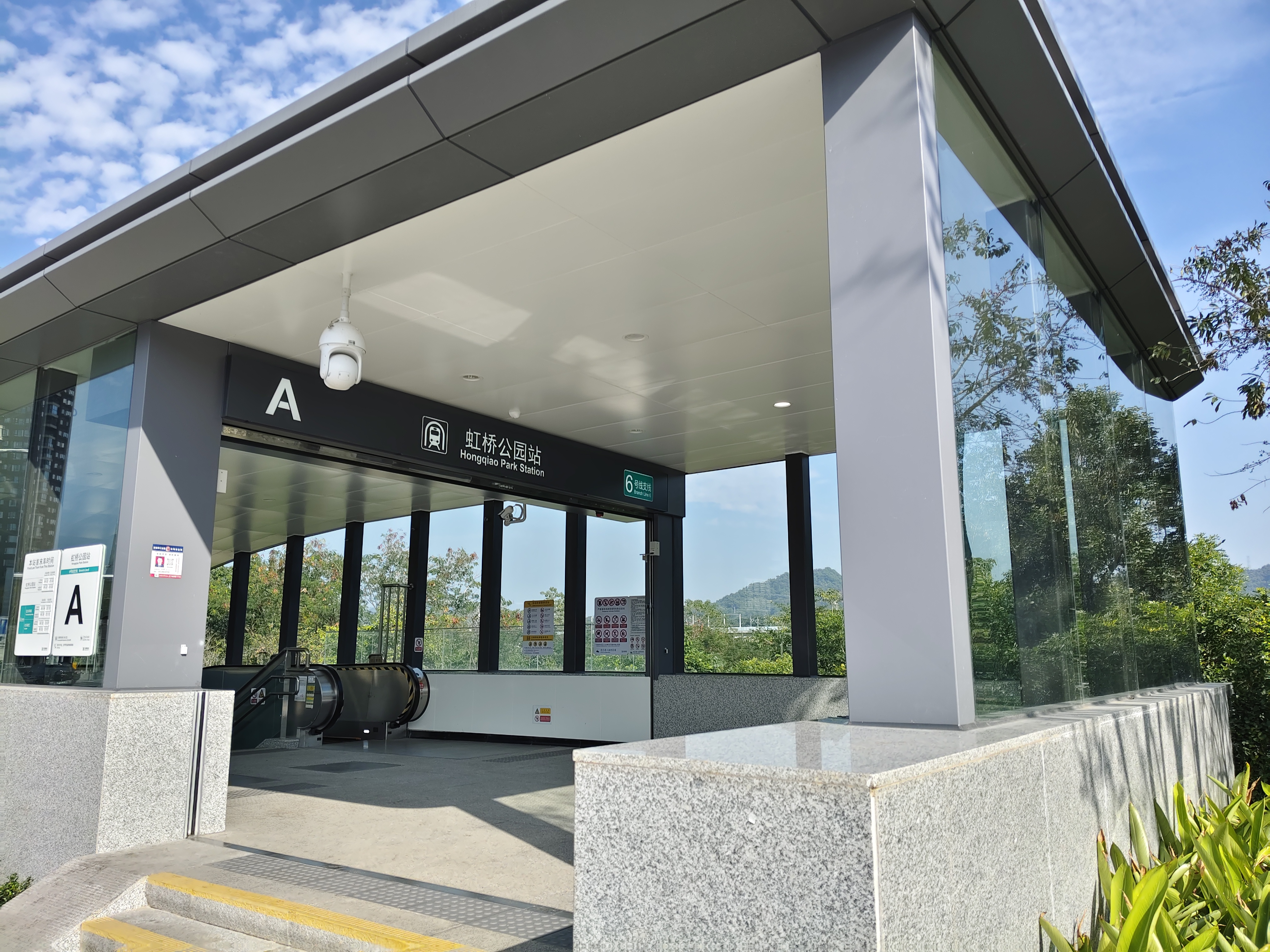
Entrance A

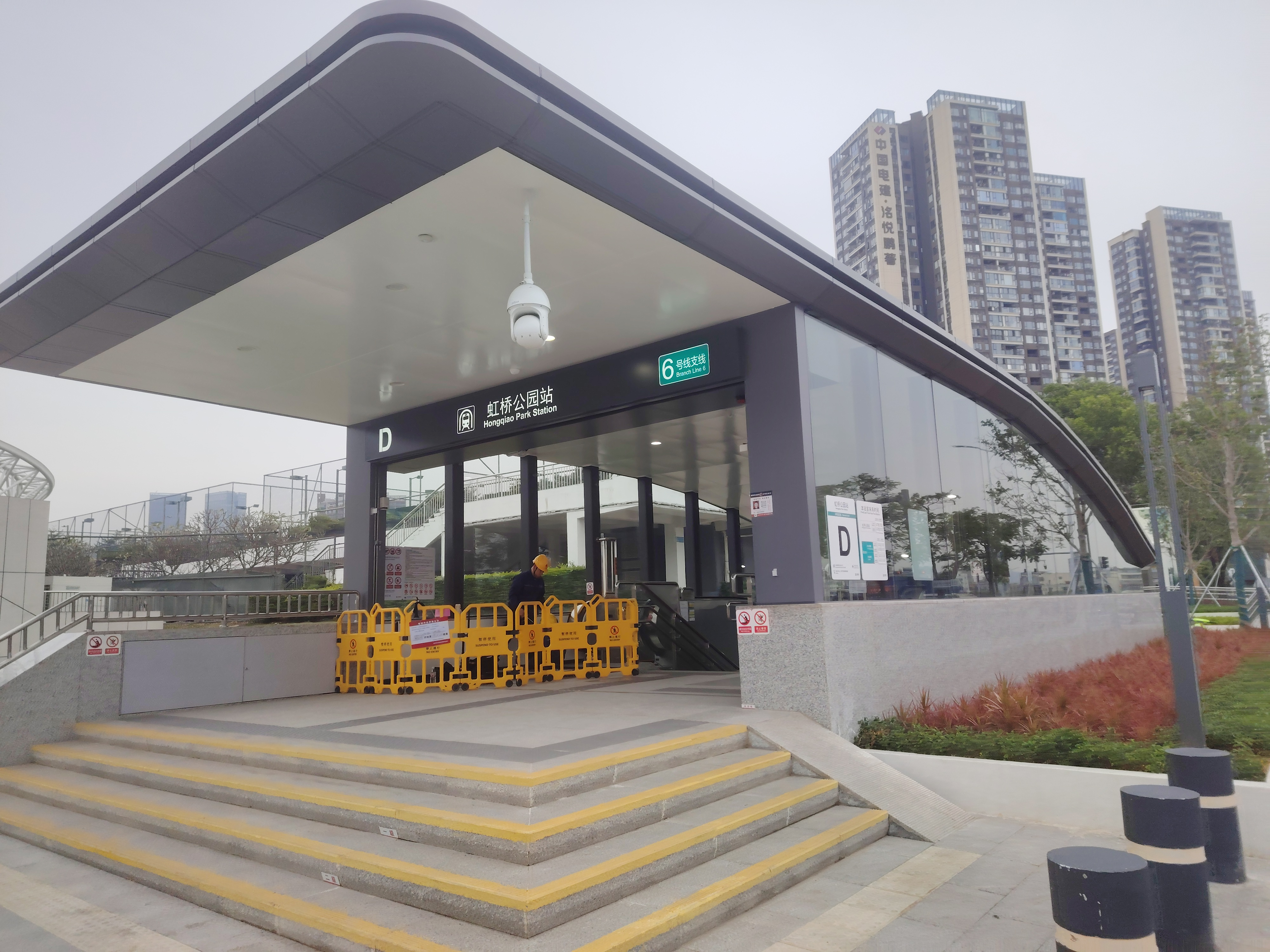
Entrance D
