= Nigang station =

Metro station in Shenzhen, China

Coordinates: 22°34′25″N 114°6′16″E

Nigang 泥岗
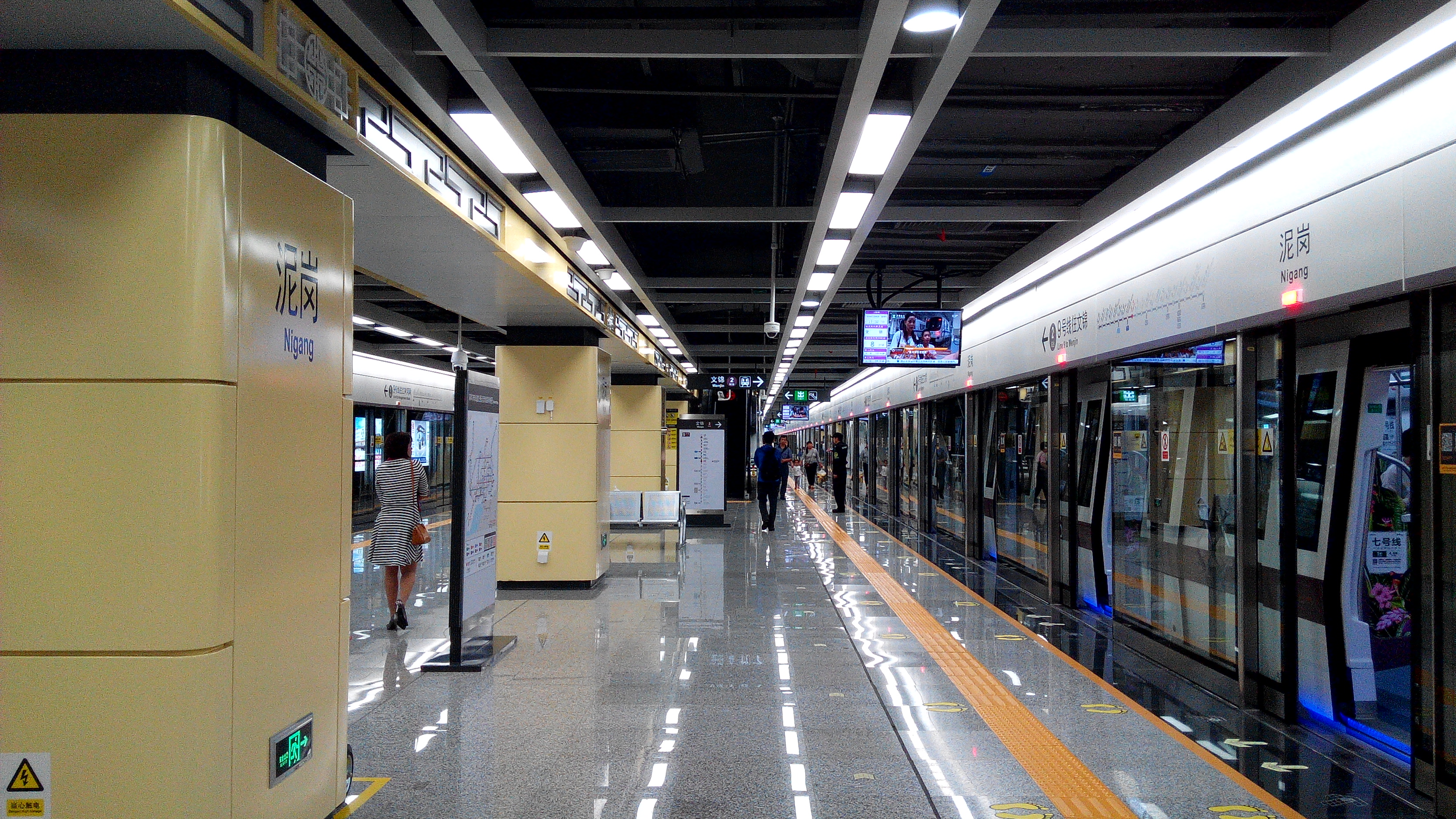

General information
- Location: Luohu District, Shenzhen, Guangdong; China
- Operator: SZMC (Shenzhen Metro Group)
- Line: Line 9

History
- Opened: 28 October 2016

Services
| Preceding station | Shenzhen Metro | Following station |
|---|---|---|
| Hongling North towards Wenjin | Line 9 | Yinhu towards Qianwan |
Location

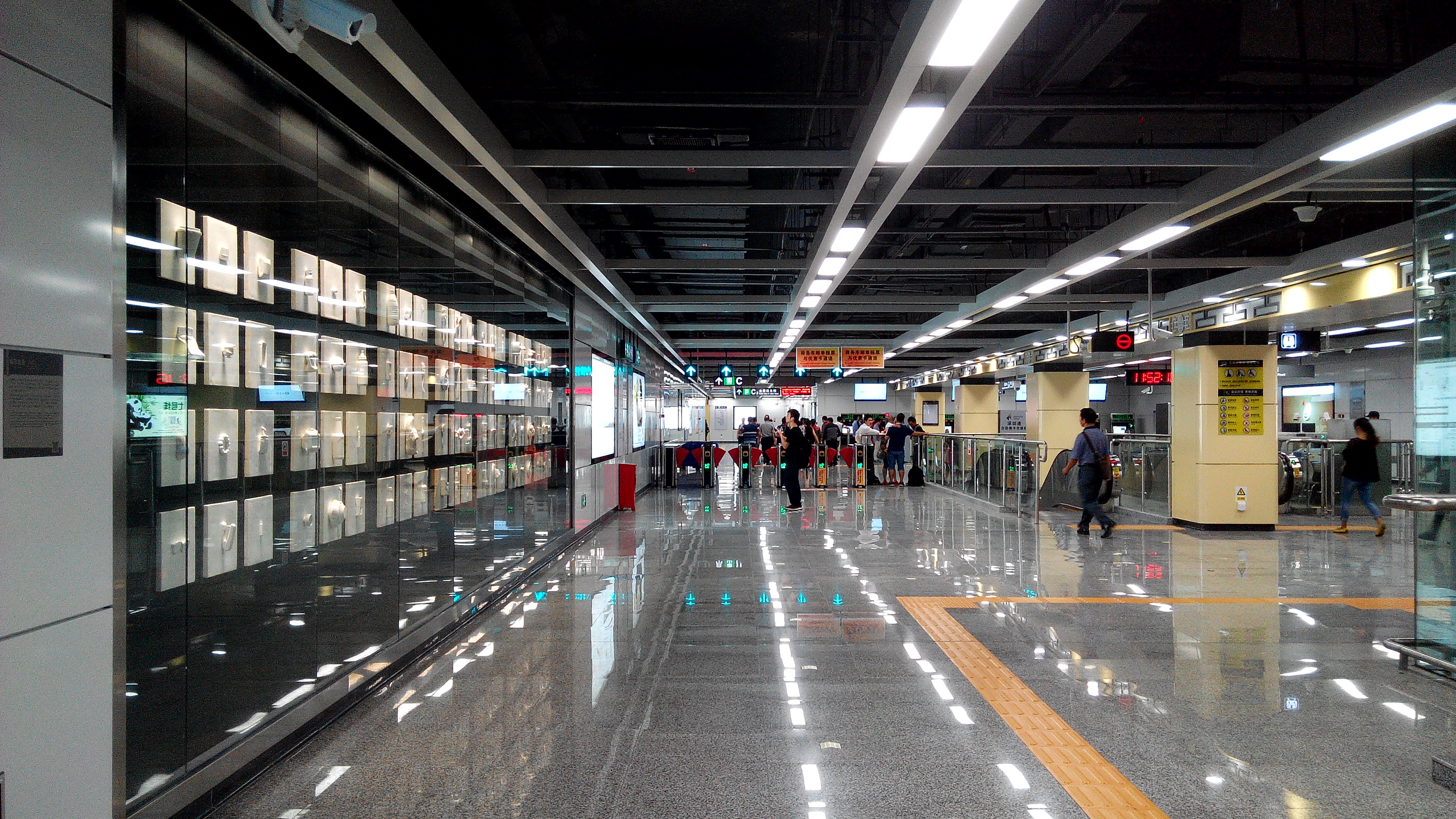
Concourse

Nigang station (simplified Chinese: 泥岗站; traditional Chinese: 泥崗站; pinyin: Nígǎng Zhàn; Jyutping: nai4 gong1 zaam6) is a metro station of Shenzhen Metro Line 9. It opened on 28 October 2016.

== Station layout ==
| G | - | Exit |
| B1F; Concourse | Lobby | Customer Service, Shops, Vending machines, ATMs |
| B2F; Platforms | Platform 1 | ← Line 9 towards Qianwan (Yinhu) |
| B2F; Platforms | Island platform, doors will open on the left |
| B2F; Platforms | Platform 2 | → Line 9 towards Wenjin (Hongling North) → |

== Exits ==
| Exit | | Destination |
|---|---|---|
| Exit A | A1 | Jinbi Road (S), Jinbi Branch Road, Nigang Campus of Shenzhen Middle School, Shenzhen No.3 Vocational School of Technology, Nigang Xicun, Yinhu School, Nigang Community Park |
| Exit A | A2 | Reserved |
| Exit B | | Reserved |
| Exit C | C1 | Reserved |
| Exit C | C2 | Jinbi Road (N), Jinyin Yuan, Xinghu Garden, Dadi Yuan, Fengguang Primary School, Nigang Pocket Park, Nigang Beicun, Yinhui Mingju |
| Exit D | | Reserved |
