= Yinhu station (Shenzhen Metro) =

Metro station in Shenzhen, China

Coordinates: 22°34′26″N 114°5′46″E

Yinhu 银湖
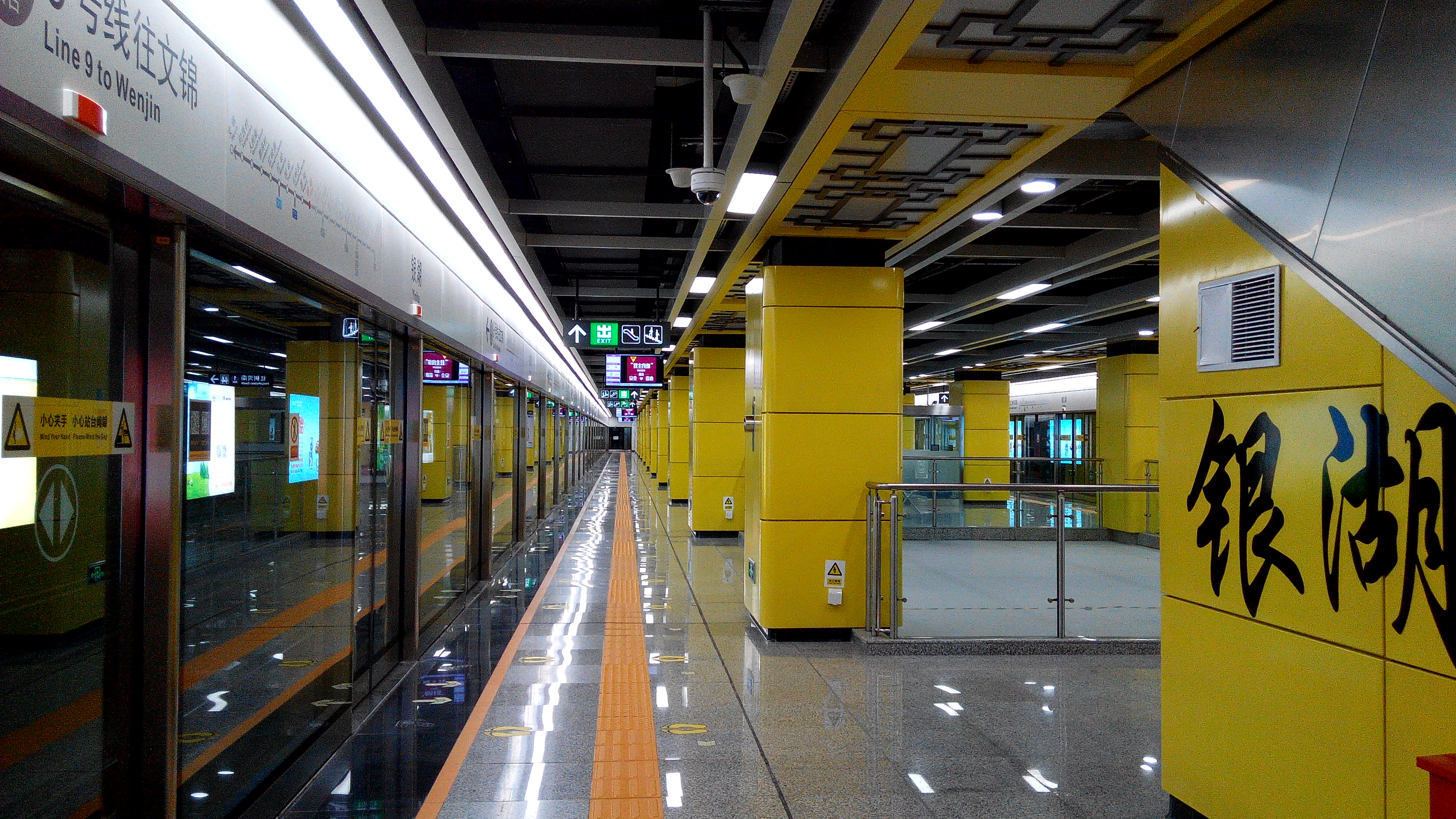
- Line 9 platform

General information
- Location: Luohu District, Shenzhen, Guangdong; China
- Operator: SZMC (Shenzhen Metro Group)
- Lines: Line 6; Line 9
- Platforms: 4 (2 island platforms)
- Tracks: 4

Construction
- Structure type: Underground
- Accessible: Yes

History
- Opened: 28 October 2016 (Line 9); 18 August 2020 (Line 6)

Services
Preceding station	Shenzhen Metro	Following station
Hanling towards Songgang	Line 6	Bagualing towards Science Museum
Nigang towards Wenjin	Line 9	Maling towards Qianwan
Track layout
9 Upper platforms
6 Lower platforms
Location

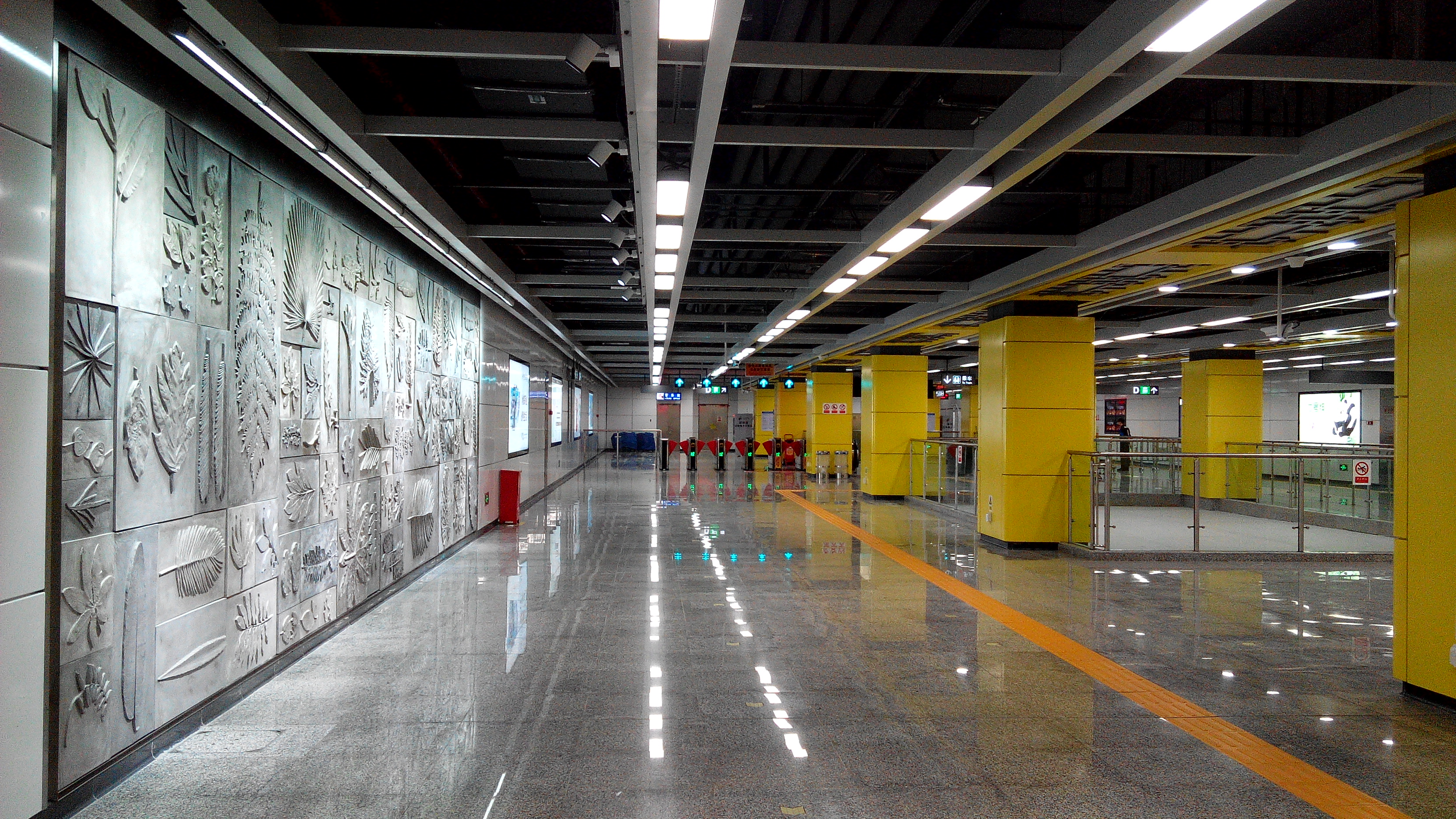
Concourse

Yinhu station (simplified Chinese: 银湖站; traditional Chinese: 銀湖站; pinyin: Yínhú Zhàn; Jyutping: ngan4 wu4 zaam6) is a station of Line 6 and Line 9 of the Shenzhen Metro. Line 9 platforms opened on 28 October 2016 and Line 6 platforms opened on 18 August 2020.

== Station layout ==
G	-	Exit
B1F; Concourse	Lobby	Customer Service, Shops, Vending machines, ATMs
B2F; Platforms	Platform 1	← Line 9 towards Qianwan (Maling)
B2F; Platforms	Island platform, doors will open on the left
B2F; Platforms	Platform 2	→ Line 9 towards Wenjin (Nigang) →
B3F; Platforms	Platform	← Line 6 towards Science Museum (Bagualing)
B3F; Platforms	Island platform, doors will open on the left
B3F; Platforms	Platform	→ Line 6 towards Songgang (Hanling) →

== Exits ==
Exit	Destination
Exit A	Reserved
Exit B	Beihuan Boulevard (E), Jinbi Road, Jinhu Tower, Sijiqing Garden, Shenzhen Flower Associacion
Exit C	Reserved
Exit D	Beihuan Boulevard (E), Yinhu Intercity-bus Station, Jinbi Yuan, Jinhu Villa, Shenzhen Fine Art Institute, Yinhu Tourism Center
