= Hongling North station =

Metro station in Shenzhen, Guangdong, China

Hongling North 红岭北
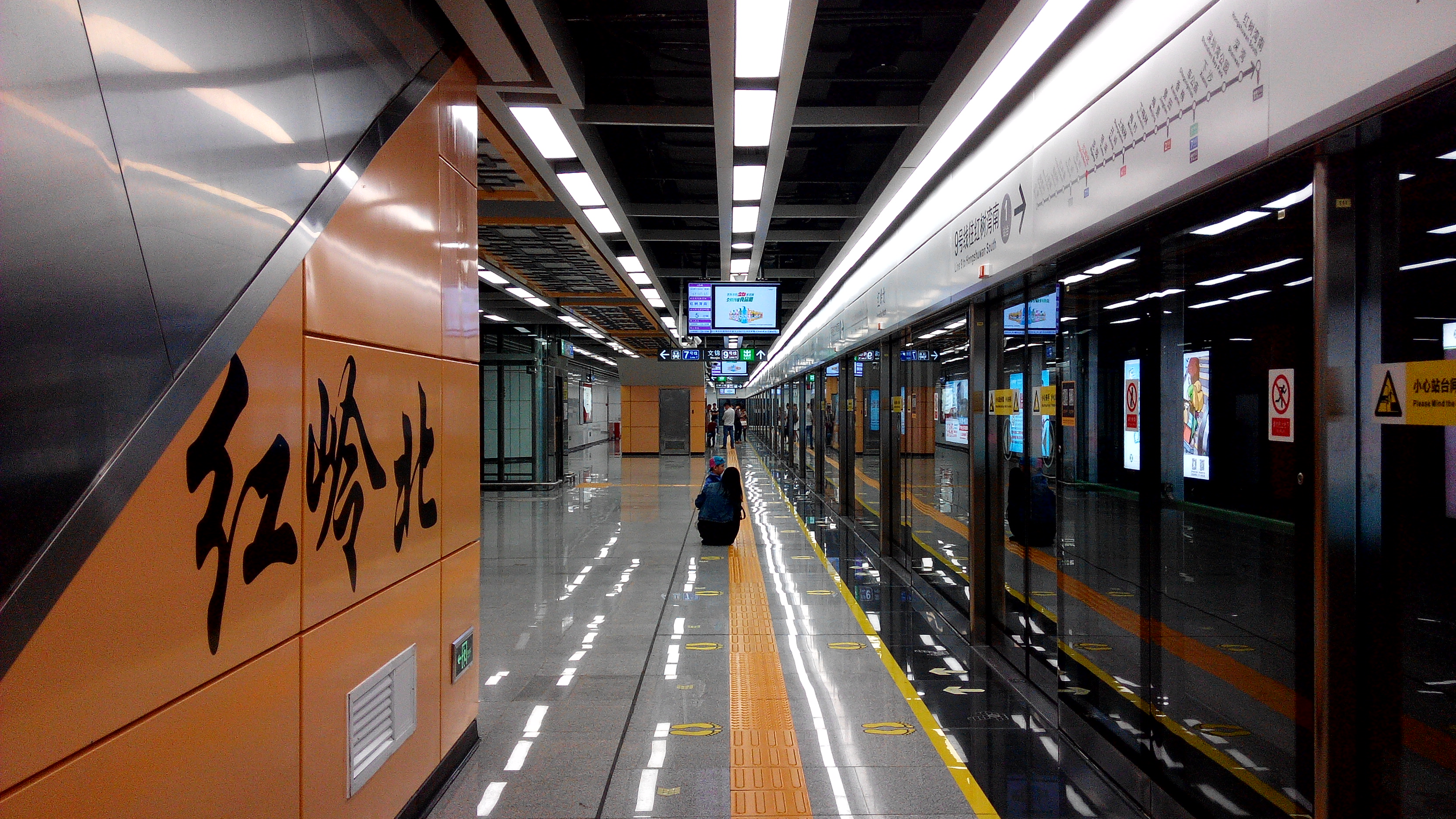
- Line 9 platform (towards Qianwan)

General information
- Location: Boundary between Luohu and Futian, Shenzhen, Guangdong; China
- Coordinates: 22°34′6″N 114°6′39″E
- Operated by: SZMC (Shenzhen Metro Group)
- Lines: Line 7; Line 9
- Platforms: 4 (1 island platform and 2 side platforms)
- Tracks: 5

Construction
- Structure type: Underground
- Accessible: Yes

History
- Opened: 28 October 2016 (9 years ago)

Services
| Preceding station | Shenzhen Metro | Following station |
|---|---|---|
| Bagualing towards SZU Lihu Campus | Line 7 | Sungang towards Tai'an |
| Yuanling towards Wenjin | Line 9 | Nigang towards Qianwan |
Location

Hongling North station (simplified Chinese: 红岭北站; traditional Chinese: 紅嶺北站; pinyin: Hónglǐng Běi Zhàn; Jyutping: hung4 ling5 bak1 zaam6) is a station of Shenzhen Metro Line 7 and Line 9. It opened on 28 October 2016.

== Station layout ==
| G | - | Exits A-H, J |
| B1F; Concourse | Lobby | Ticket Machines, Customer Service, Shops, Vending Machines |
| B2F; 9 Platforms | Side platform, doors will open on the right |
| B2F; 9 Platforms | Platform | 9 towards Qianwan (Nigang) |
| B2F; 9 Platforms | Side track | For trains of Line 9 |
| B2F; 9 Platforms | Platform | 9 towards Wenjin (Yuanling) |
| B2F; 9 Platforms | Side platform, doors will open on the right |
| B3F; 7 Platforms | Platform | 7 towards SZU Lihu Campus (Bagualing) |
| B3F; 7 Platforms | Island platform, doors will open on the left |
| B3F; 7 Platforms | Platform | 7 towards Tai'an (Sungang) |

== Exits ==
| Exit | Destination |
|---|---|
| Exit A | Bagua 4th Road, Shen'ai Building, Guangqian Industry District, Shenyao Building, Wanle Building, Rongsheng Building, Shenzhen No.4 People's Hospital (Futian Hospital), Suotaike Building, Huachengda Building |
| Exit B | Zhongxin Technology Building, Bagua 3rd Road |
| Exit C | Reserved |
| Exit D | The first Inspection Department of Shenzhen Municipal Administration of Local Taxation, Taoyuan Commercial Building, East Side of Hongling North Road (S), South Side of Meiyuan Road, AKD Luxury Cars Mall, Jidian Building, Art Design Center |
| Exit E | Reserved |
| Exit F | Reserved |
| Exit G | North Side of Meiyuan Road, Art Design Center, Pearl Art Pacific, West Side of Liyuan Road |
| Exit H | Reserved |
| Exit J | East Side of Hongling North Road (N) |
