= Hongling South station =

Shenzhen Metro Line 9 and Line 11 station

Hongling South 红岭南
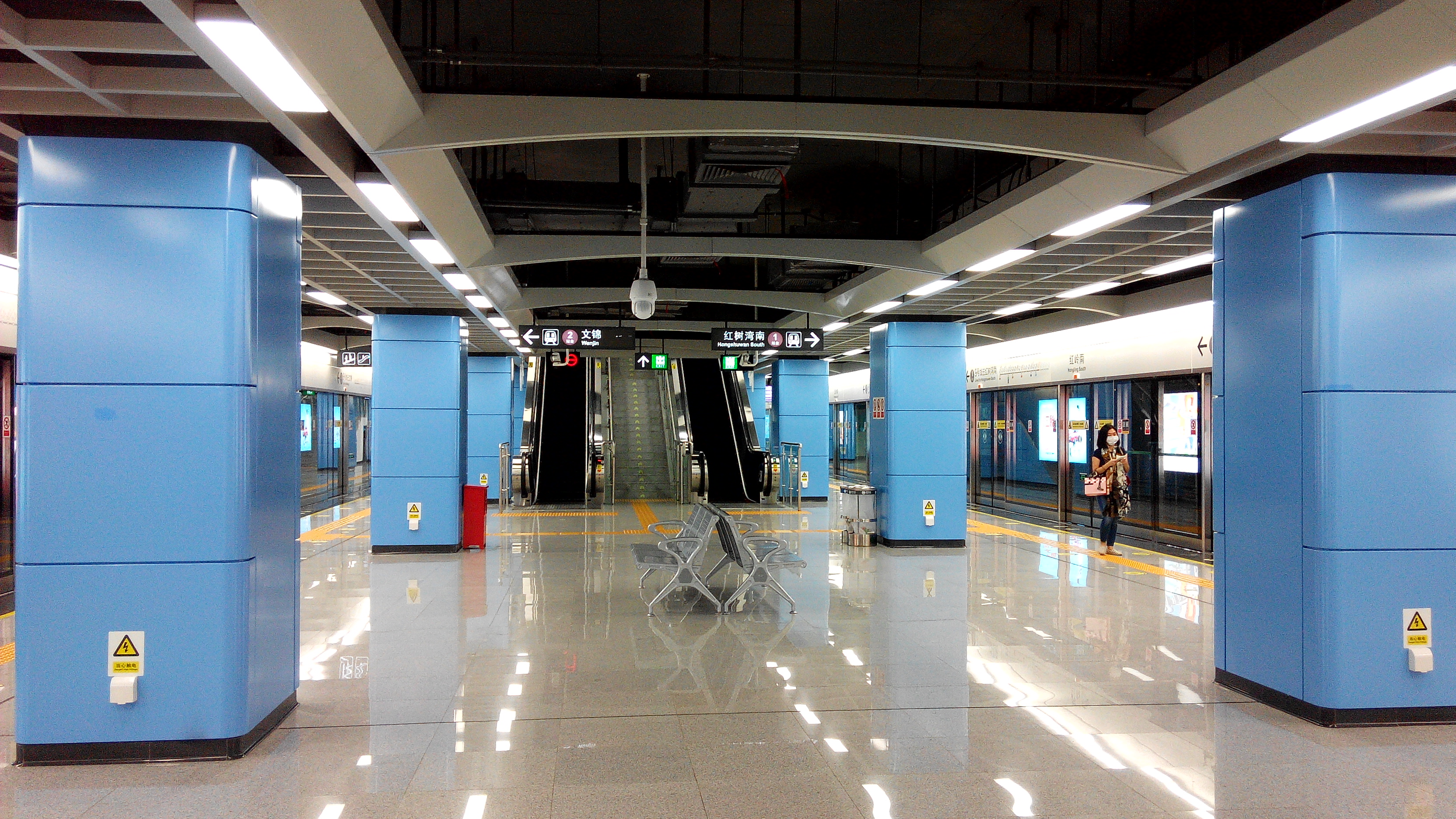
- Line 9 platform

General information
- Location: Intersection of Shennan East Road (深南东路) and Hongling South Road (红岭南路); Nanyuan Subdistrict and Guiyuan Subdistrict Boundary between Luohu and Futian, Shenzhen, Guangdong; China
- Coordinates: 22°32′32.2″N 114°5′59.5″E
- Operated by: SZMC (Shenzhen Metro Group)
- Lines: Line 9 Line 11
- Platforms: 4 (2 island platforms)
- Tracks: 4
- Connections: Grand Theater: 1 2 5

Construction
- Structure type: Underground
- Accessible: Yes

History
- Opened: Line 9: 28 October 2016 (9 years ago); Line 11: 28 December 2025 (6 months ago)

Services
Preceding station	Shenzhen Metro	Following station
Ludancun towards Wenjin	Line 9	Hongling towards Qianwan
Huaqiang South towards Bitou	Line 11	Terminus
Out-of-station interchange
Science Museum towards Airport East	Line 1 transfer at Grand Theater	Laojie towards Luohu
Yannan towards Chiwan	Line 2 transfer at Grand Theater	Hubei towards Liantang (Line 8: Xichong)
Terminus	Line 5 transfer at Grand Theater	Dongmen towards Chiwan
Location

Hongling South station (simplified Chinese: 红岭南站; traditional Chinese: 紅嶺南站; pinyin: Hónglǐng Nán Zhàn; Jyutping: hung4 ling5 naam4 zaam6; Cantonese Yale: Hùhng Líhng Nàahm Jaahm) is an interchange station between Line 9 and Line 11 of the Shenzhen Metro. The Line 9 station opened on 28 October 2016. This station is located under the southeast of the intersection of Hongling South Road and Shennan East Road. The station is an indirect interchange with Line 1 and Line 2 at Grand Theater Station. The Line 11 station opened on 28 December 2025.

== Station layout ==
G	-	Exits
B1F; 9 Concourse	Lobby	Ticket Machines, Customer Service, Reserved transfer passage between Line 9 and Line 11
B1F; 9 Concourse		Public space, Transfer concourse, Transfer passage towards 1 2 5 Grand Theater
B2F; 9 Platforms		9 towards Qianwan (Hongling)
B2F; 9 Platforms	Island platform, doors will open on the left
B2F; 9 Platforms		9 towards Wenjin (Ludancun)
B2F; 9 Platforms	11 Lobby	Ticket Machines, Customer Service
B3F; 11 Platforms		11 towards Bitou (Huaqiang South)
B3F; 11 Platforms	Island platform, doors will open on the left
B3F; 11 Platforms		11 termination platform

=== Gallery ===
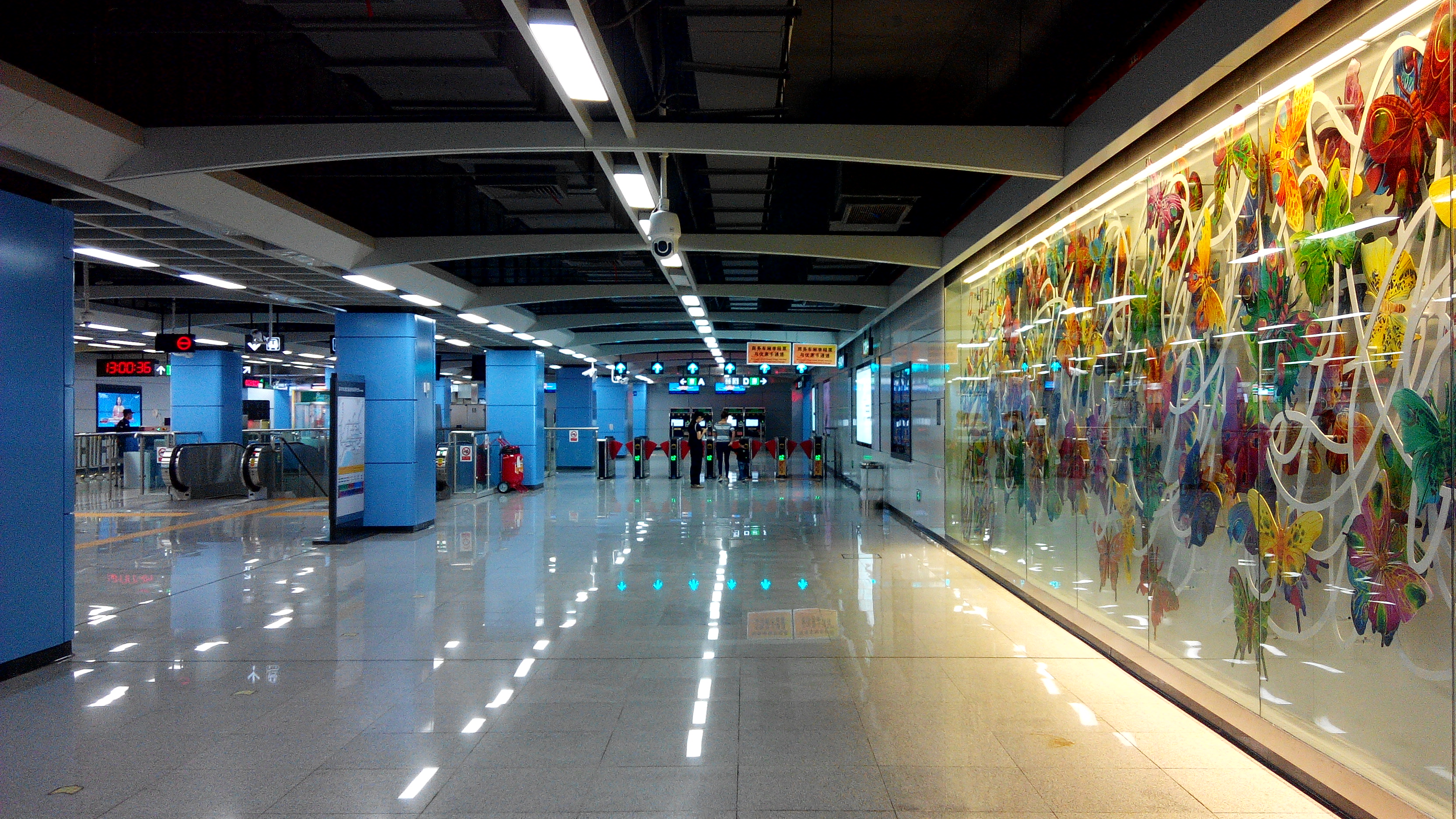
Line 9 concourse

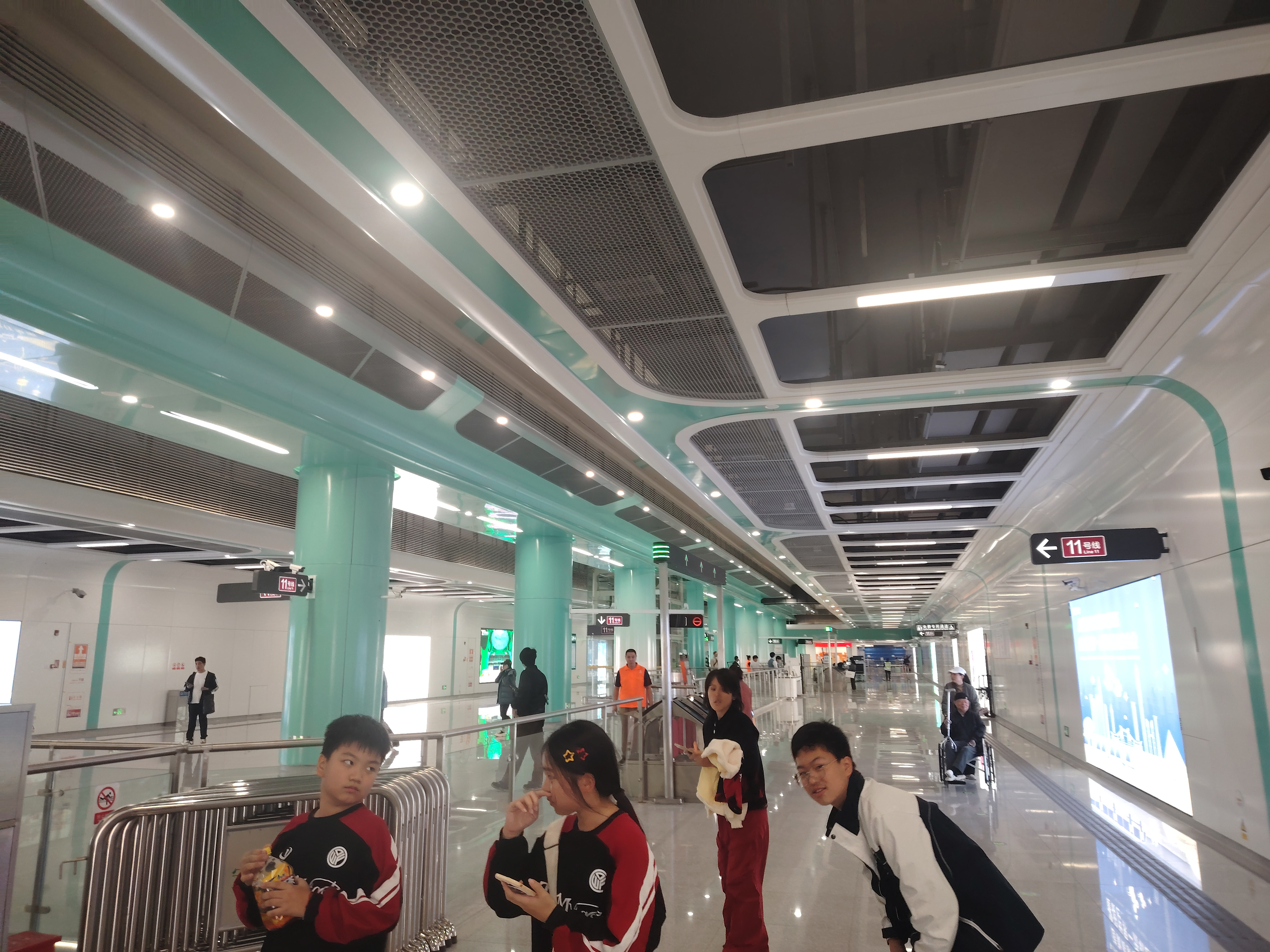
Line 11 concourse

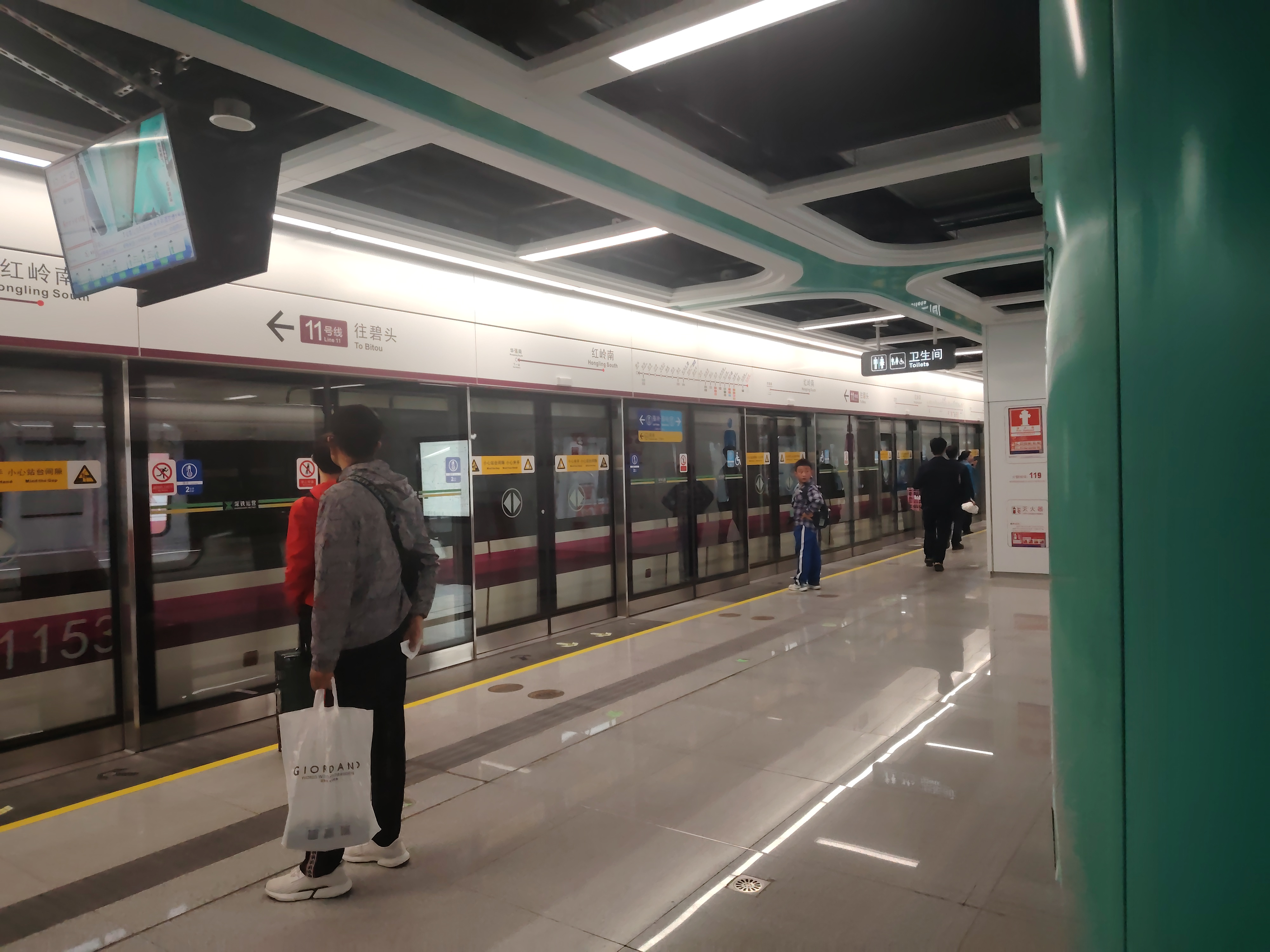
Line 11 platform

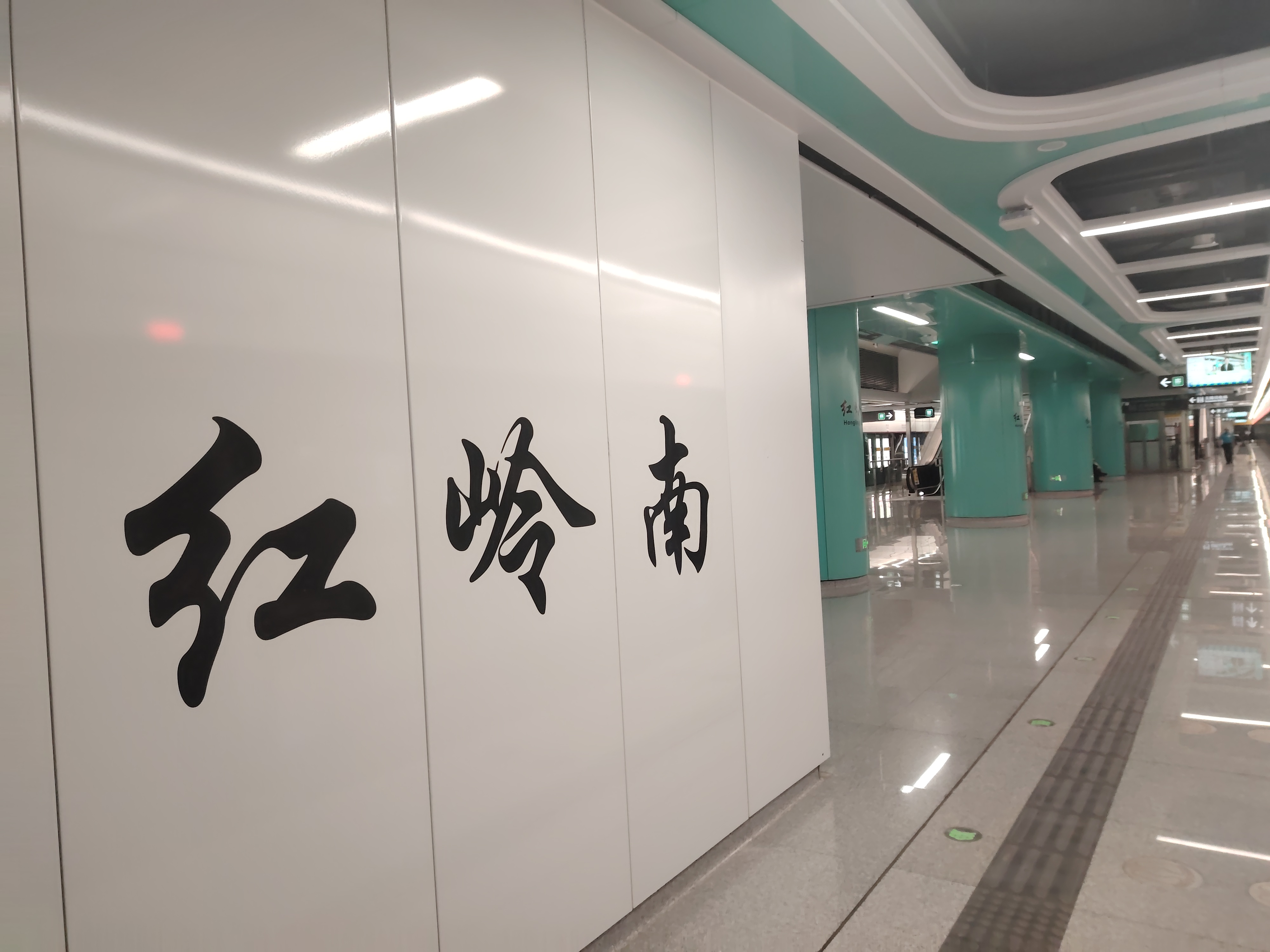
Line 11 platform calligraphy

=== Entrances/exits ===
The Line 9 station has 4 points of entry/exit, of which Exit A is connected to the underground crossing of the Grand Theater, and there is an underground passage next to Exit D to connect to Grand Theater Station. There is also Exit B which has not been built. There are currently only two entrances/exits of Line 11 (Exits E and G). Exits F and H of Line 11 are reserved, as surrounding these exits is currently a construction site. Exits D and G are accessible via elevators.

- A: Hongling South Road, Hongling Building, Shennan Middle Road, Wande Building, News Building, Deng Xiaoping's Portrait, Lizhi Park, Lixiangfang, Shenzhen Grand Theater, Hongling Middle Road
- ~~B~~: (not open)
- C: Jinhua Street, Lijing Building
- D: Shennan East Road, Financial Center, Jintang Street, Shenye Center, China Construction Bank Building, Shenzhen Bookstore, Bookstore Road, 1 2 5 Grand Theater station
- E: Jinhua Street, Urban Construction Yunqi Building, Binyuan Community, Binhe Primary School
- G: Jintang Street, Lichang Building, Luohu Senior High School, Ping An Bank Building
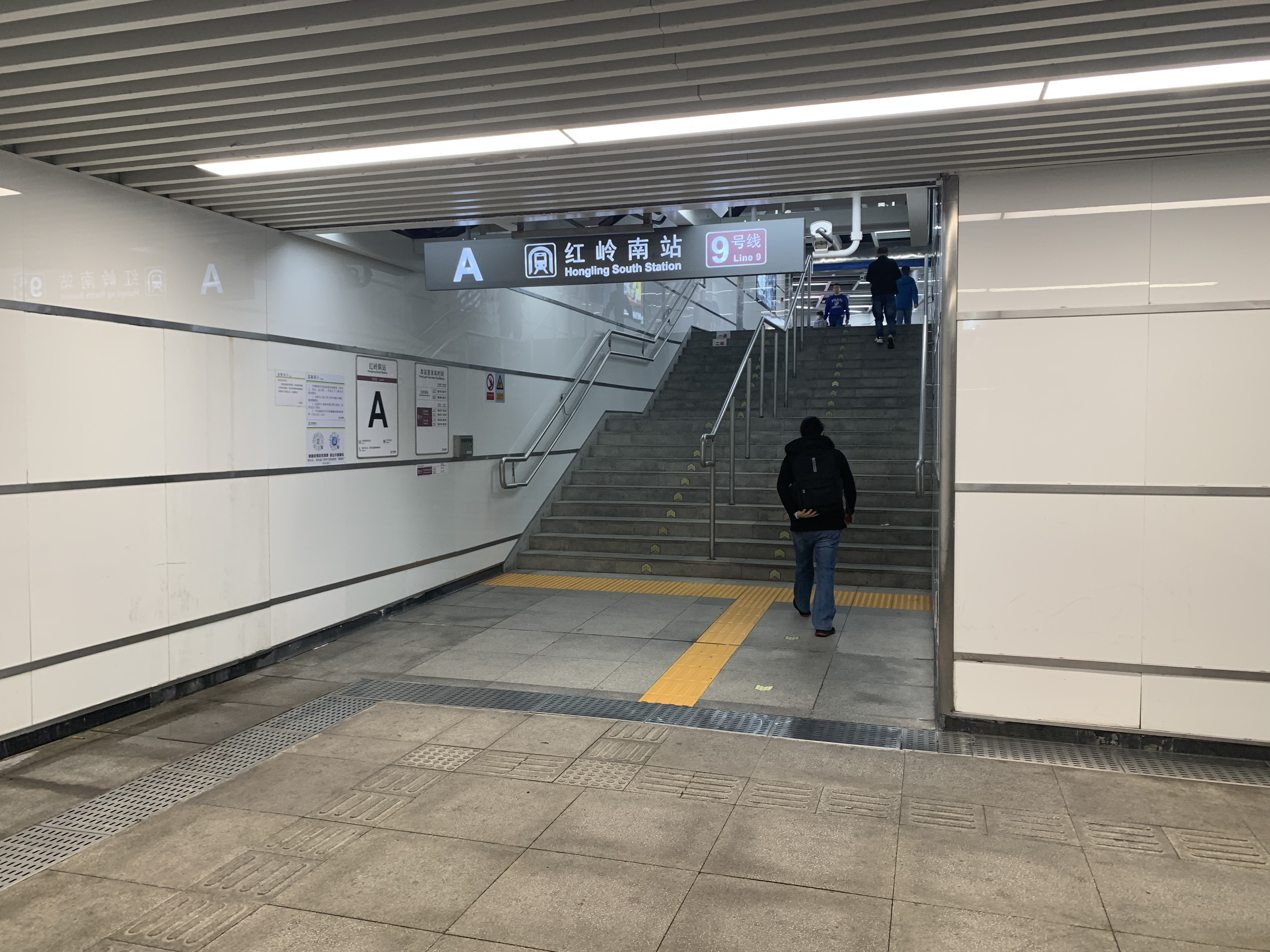
Entrance A

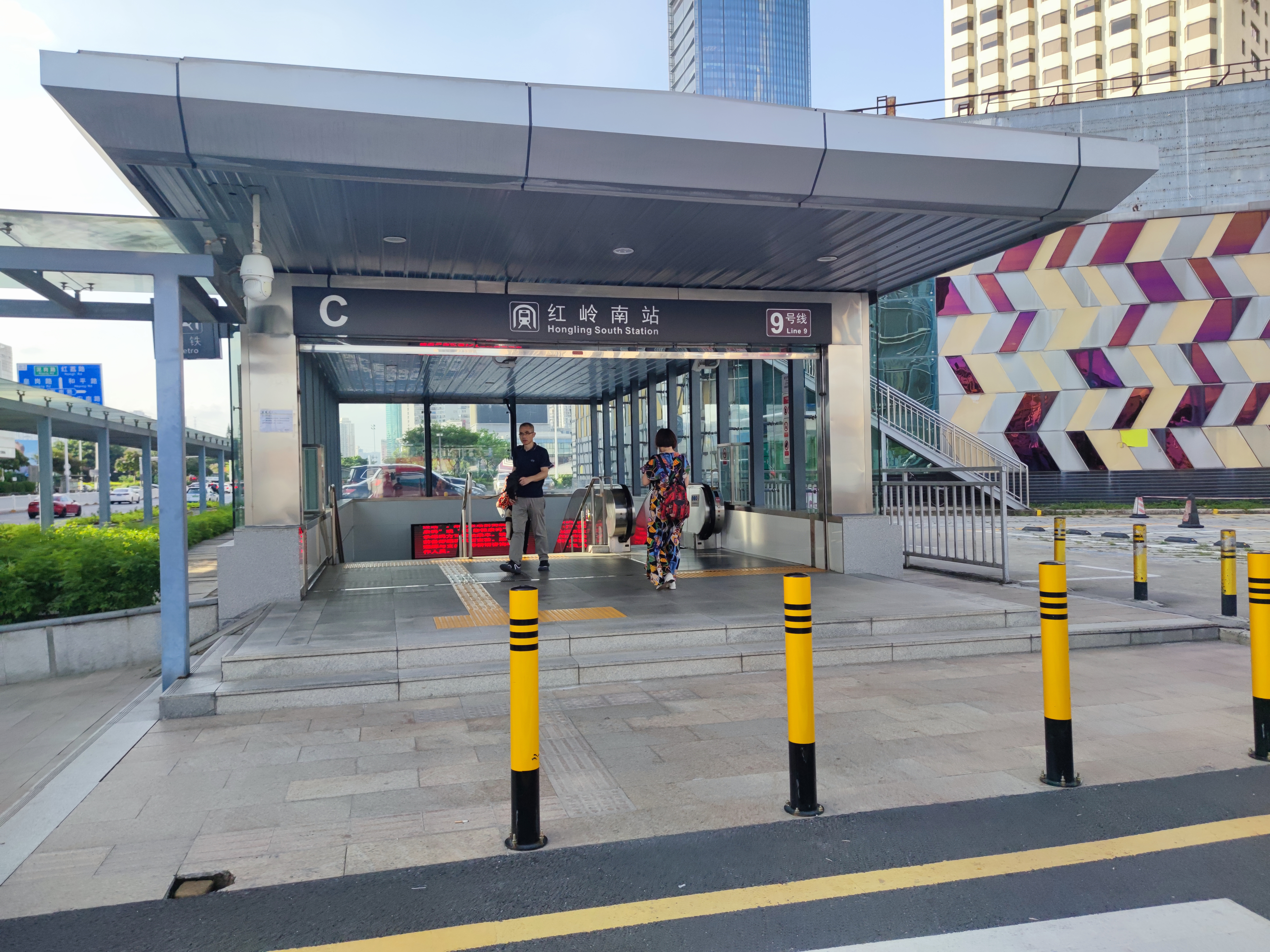
Entrance C

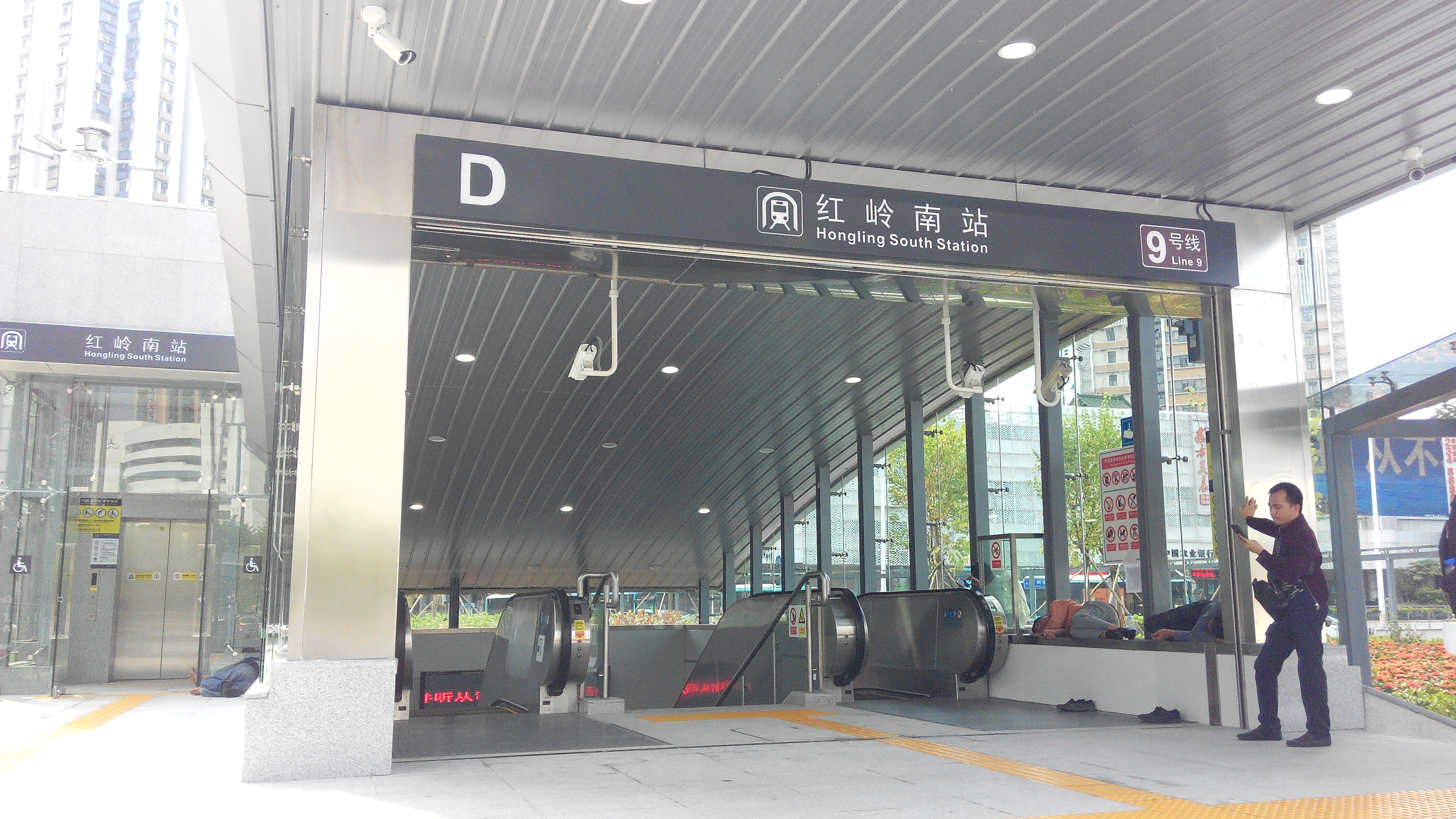
Entrance D

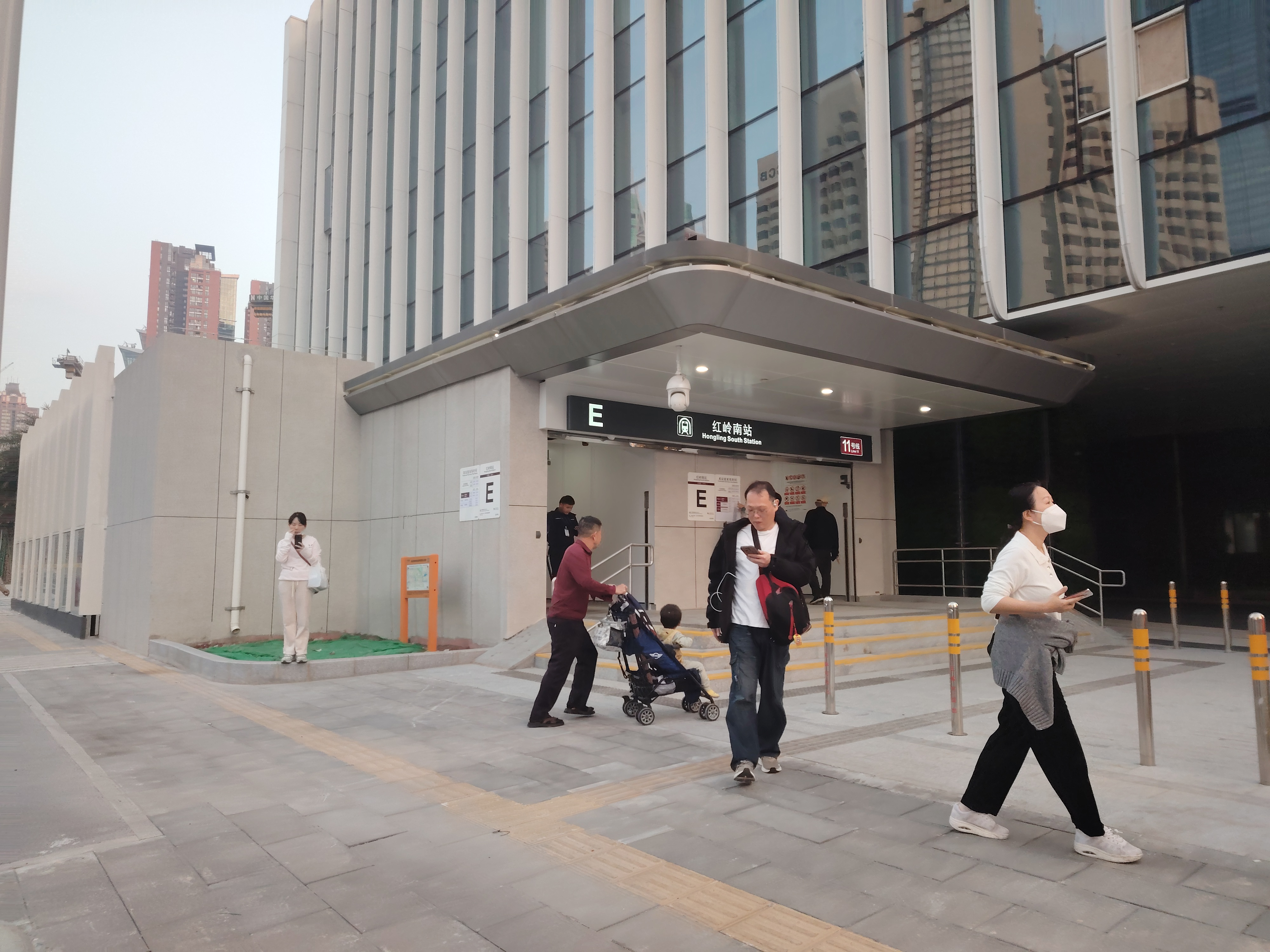
Entrance E

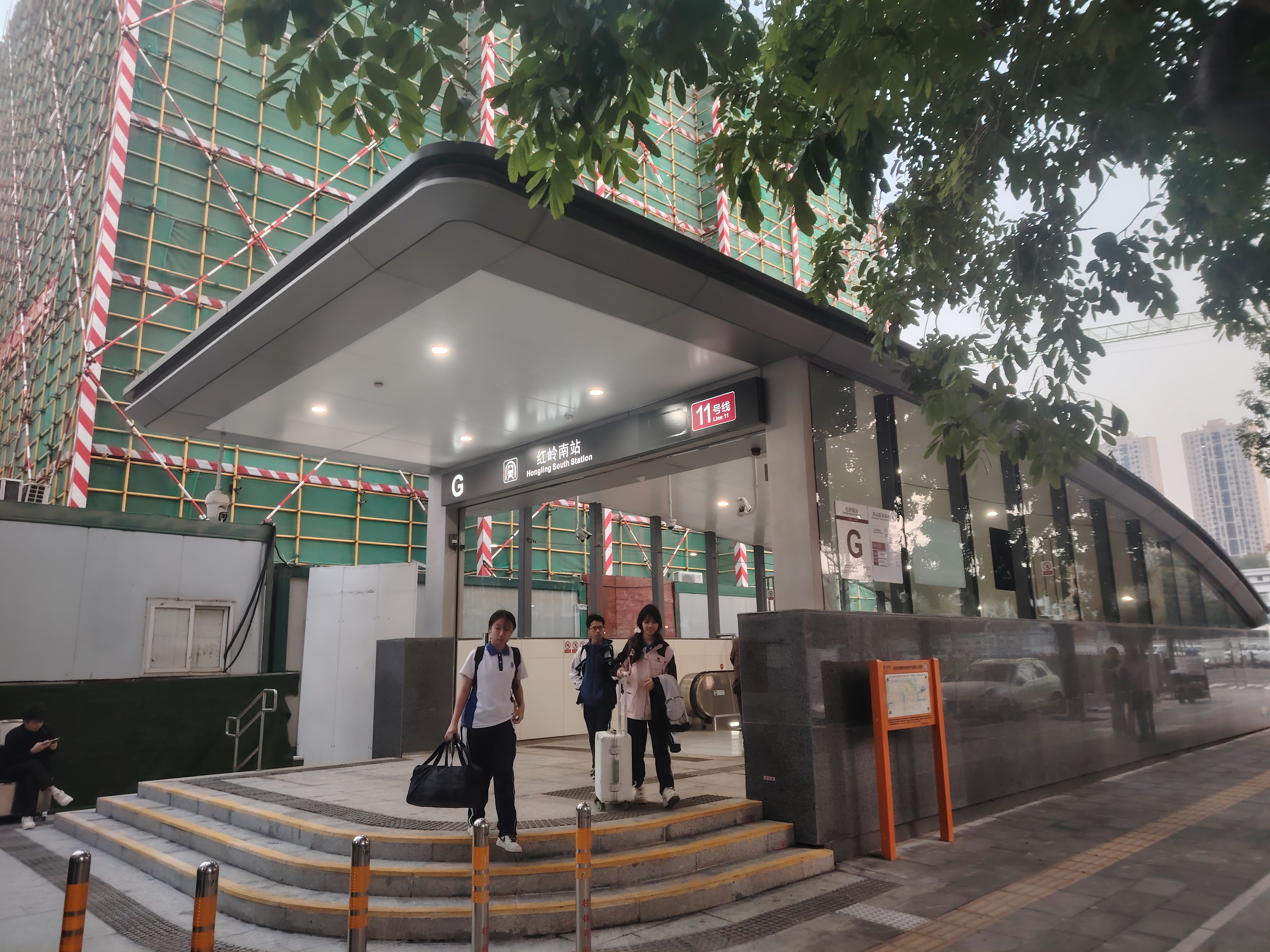
Entrance G
