= Hongling station =

Metro station in Shenzhen, Guangdong, China

Hongling 红岭
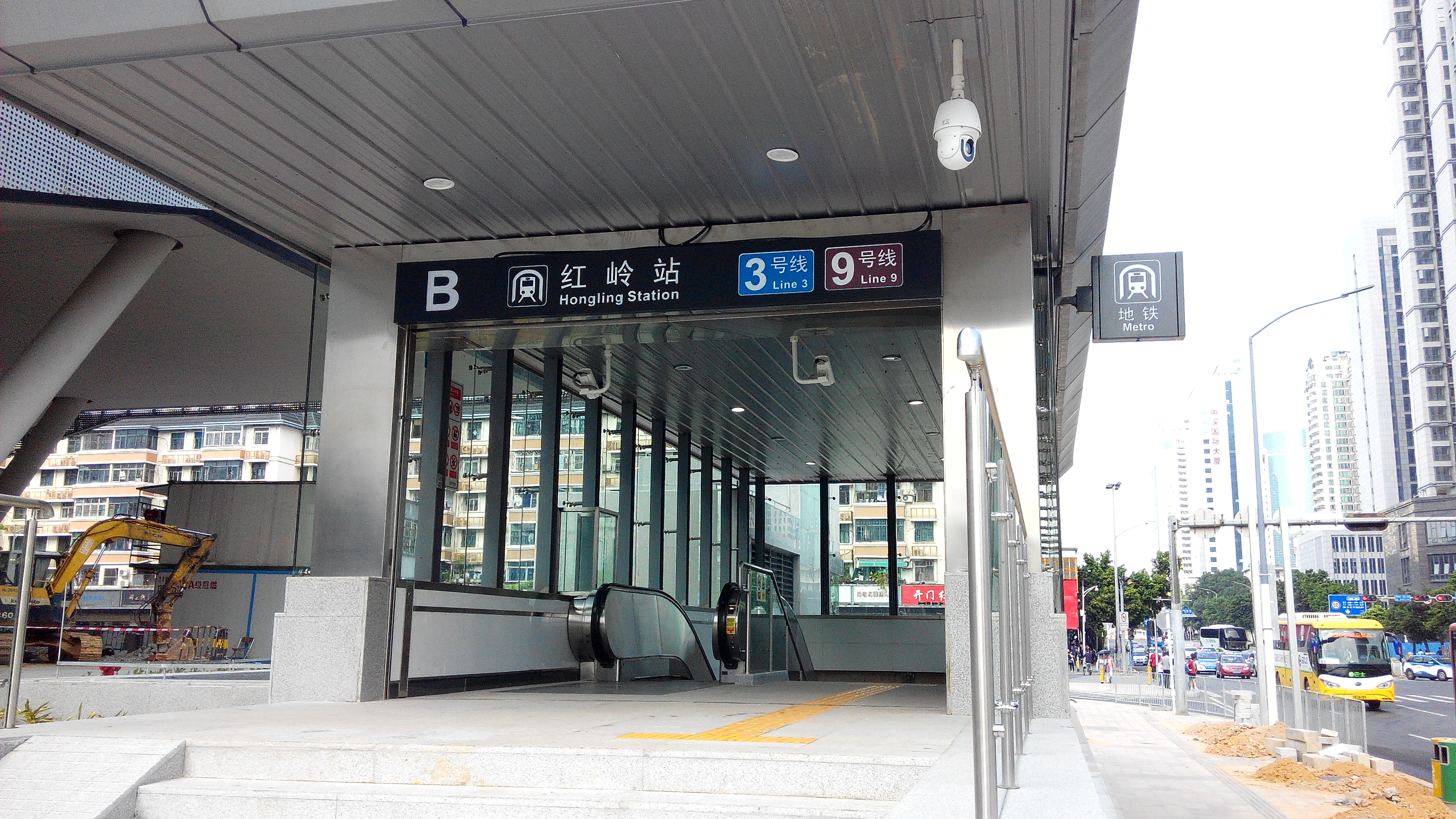
- Exit B

General information
- Location: Boundary between Luohu and Futian, Shenzhen, Guangdong; China
- Coordinates: 22°33′19.19″N 114°6′37.02″E
- Operator: SZMC (Shenzhen Metro Group)
- Lines: Line 3; Line 9
- Platforms: 4 (2 island platforms)
- Tracks: 4

Construction
- Structure type: Underground
- Accessible: Yes

History
- Opened: Line 3: 28 June 2011 (15 years ago); Line 9: 28 October 2016 (9 years ago)

Services
Preceding station	Shenzhen Metro	Following station
Laojie towards Pingdi Liulian	Line 3	Tongxinling towards Futian Bonded Area
Hongling South towards Wenjin	Line 9	Yuanling towards Qianwan
Track layout
3 Upper platforms
9 Lower platforms
Location

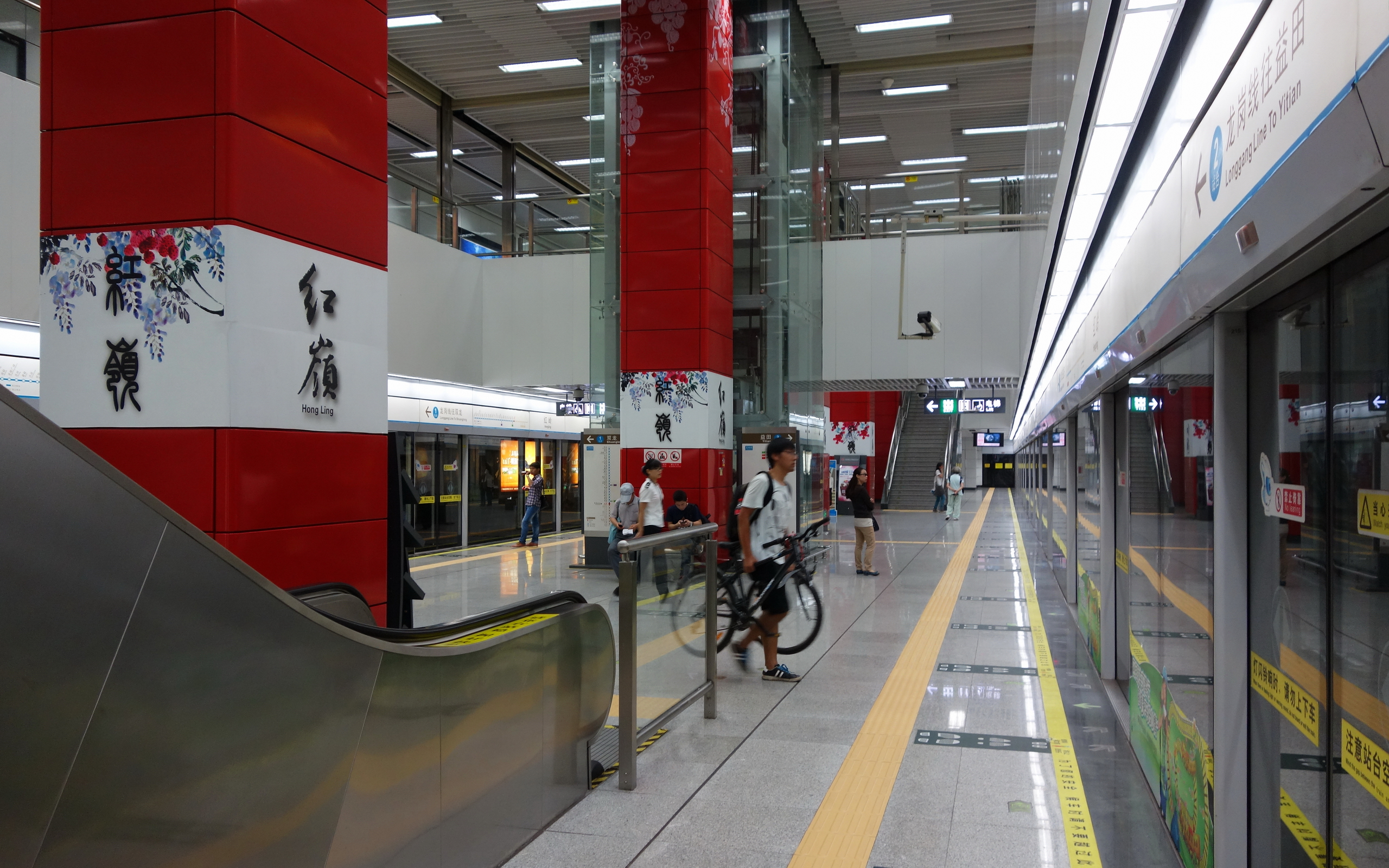
Line 3 platforms

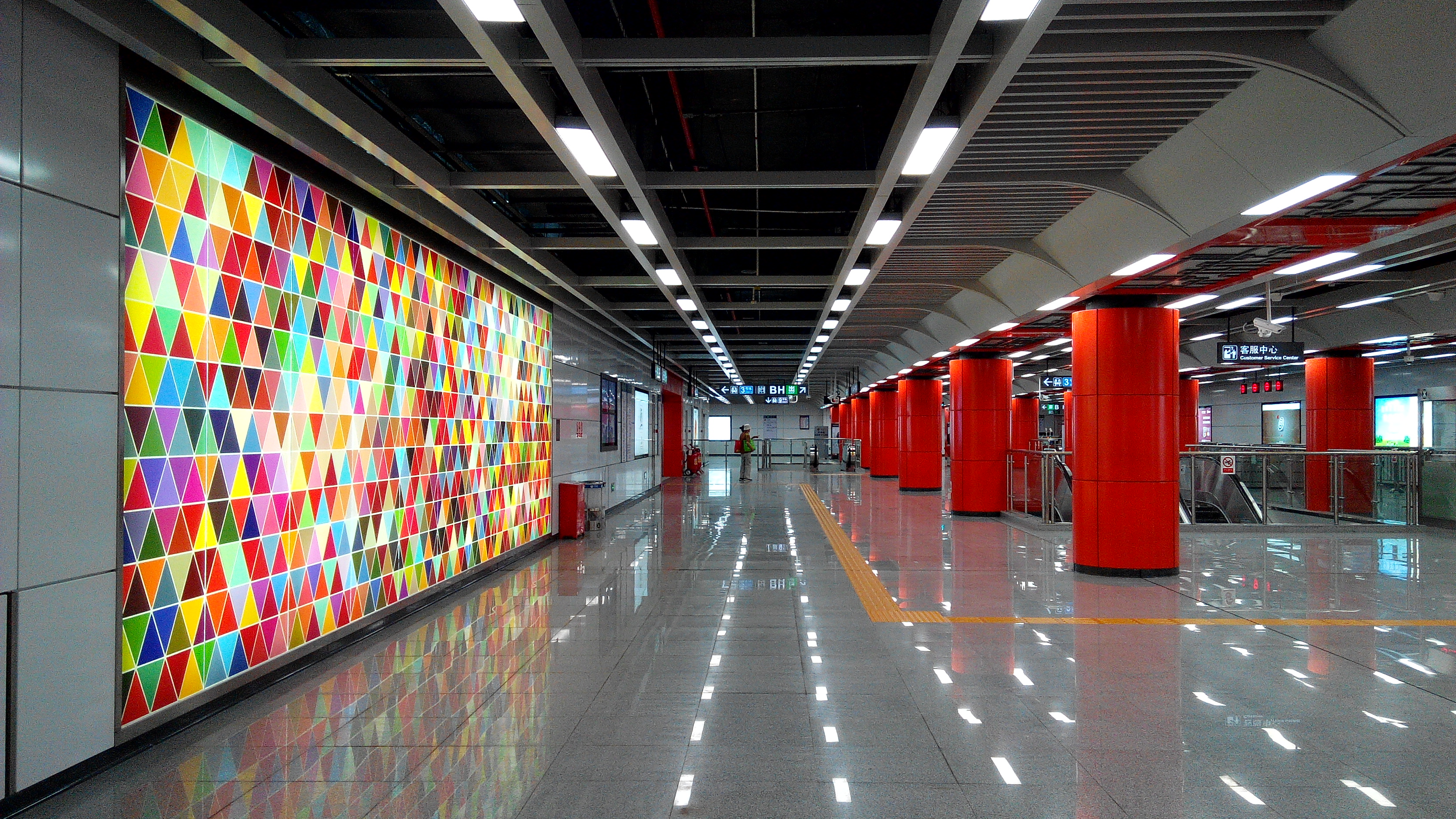
Line 9 concourse

Hongling station (simplified Chinese: 红岭站; traditional Chinese: 紅嶺站; pinyin: Hónglǐng Zhàn; Jyutping: hung4 ling5 zaam6) is a station on Line 3 and Line 9 of the Shenzhen Metro. It opened on 28 June 2011 and Line 9 platforms were added on 28 October 2016. Line 3 station is located on Hongli Road, Futian District. Line 9 station is located on Hongling Middle Road, the boundary between Luohu and Futian.

== Station layout ==
G	-	Exits A-H
B1F; Concourse	Lobby	Ticket machines, customer service, shops, vending machines, transfer passage between Line 3 and Line 9
B2F; 3 Platforms	Platform 2	3 towards Futian Bonded Area (Tongxinling)
B2F; 3 Platforms	Island platform, doors will open on the left
B2F; 3 Platforms	Platform 1	3 towards Pingdi Liulian (Laojie)
B3F; 9 Platforms	Platform 3	9 towards Qianwan (Yuanling)
B3F; 9 Platforms	Island platform, doors will open on the left
B3F; 9 Platforms	Platform 4	9 towards Wenjin (Hongling South)

== Exits ==
Exit		Destination
Exit A		Lizhi Park, Shenzhen Youth Activity Center, Municipal Children's Library, Shenzhen Arts Hall, Yinsheng Building, Shenzhen Literary Association (Exit B of Line 9), Youth Square, Shenzhen Municipal Committee of the Communist Youth League of China
Exit B		South Side of Hongli Road (W), Shenzhen Municipal Committee of the Communist ＆ Youth League of China, Shenzhen Youth Palace, Hongling Art Museum
Exit C	C1	Yuanling Xincun
Exit C	C2	North Side of Honggui Road, Songyuan South Street, Douhui Center, Honggui Building
Exit D		Hongli Road (N), Yuanling Xincun, Hongling Middle School
Exit E		Sculpture Park of A Day of Shenzhen People, Yuanling Primary School, Yuanling Experimental Primary School, Yuanling 3Road Street, Yuan Ling Foreign Language Primary School
Exit F		Hongling Middle Road (W), Yinli Building, Children's Paradise, Lizhi Park
Exit G		Hongling Middle Road (E), Hongbao Road, Meiliyuan, Guosen Securities Building, Shenzhen International Trust Building, Lijing Building, Weideng Villa, Caiwuwei Jinlong Building, Shenzhen ZS Medical Aesthetic Hospital, Environmental Science Research Institute Of Shenzhen, Supreme People's Court First Circuit Court
Exit H		Honggui Road(S), Lottery Center, Residence Community of Hongling Group South District, Yangguang Zhuangyuan
