= Yuanling station =

Metro station in Shenzhen, Guangdong, China

Coordinates: 22°33′44″N 114°6′39″E

Yuanling 园岭
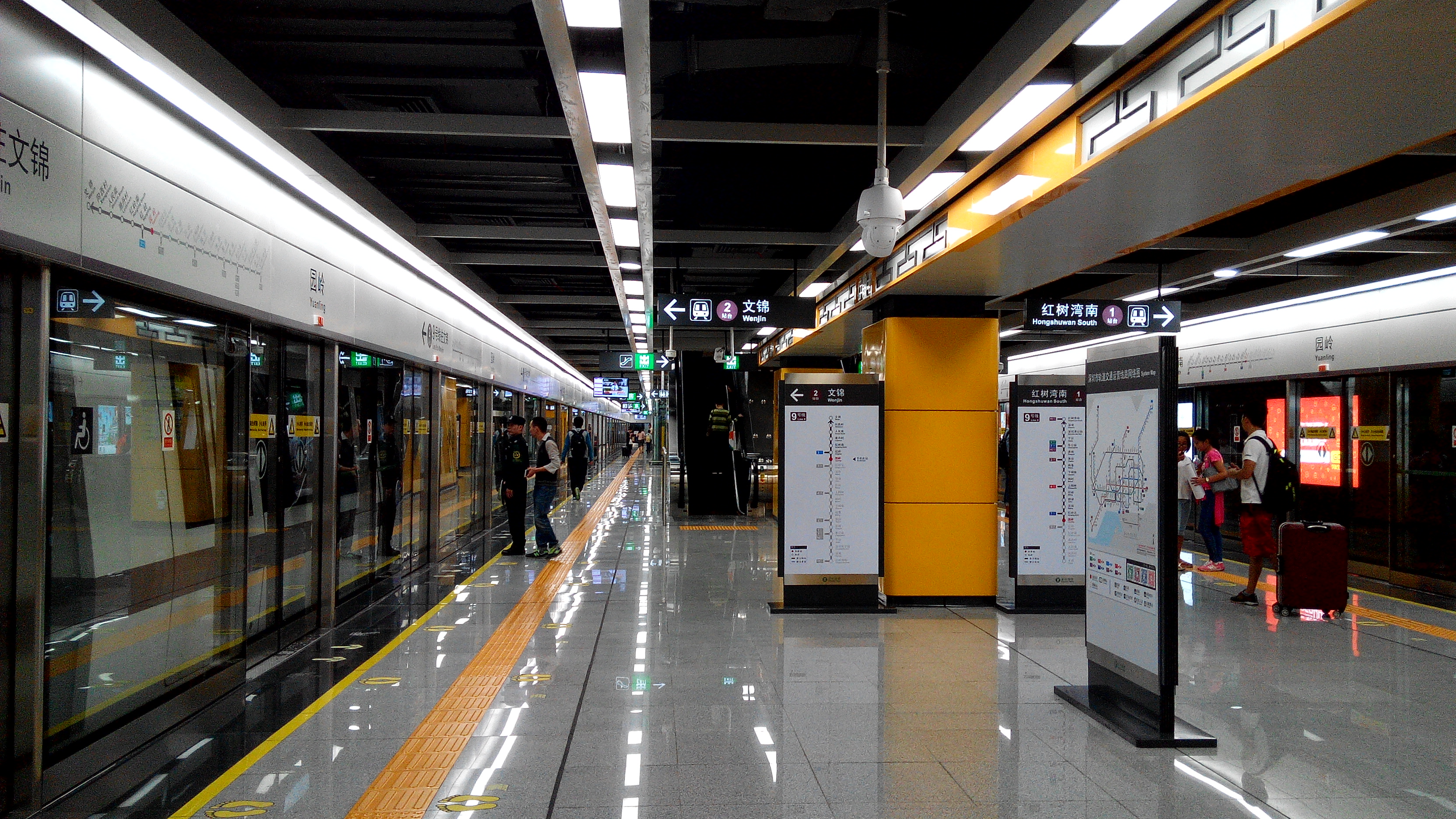

General information
- Location: Boundary between Luohu and Futian, Shenzhen, Guangdong; China
- Operated by: SZMC (Shenzhen Metro Group)
- Line: Line 9

History
- Opened: 28 October 2016

Services
Preceding station	Shenzhen Metro	Following station
Hongling towards Wenjin	Line 9	Hongling North towards Qianwan
Location

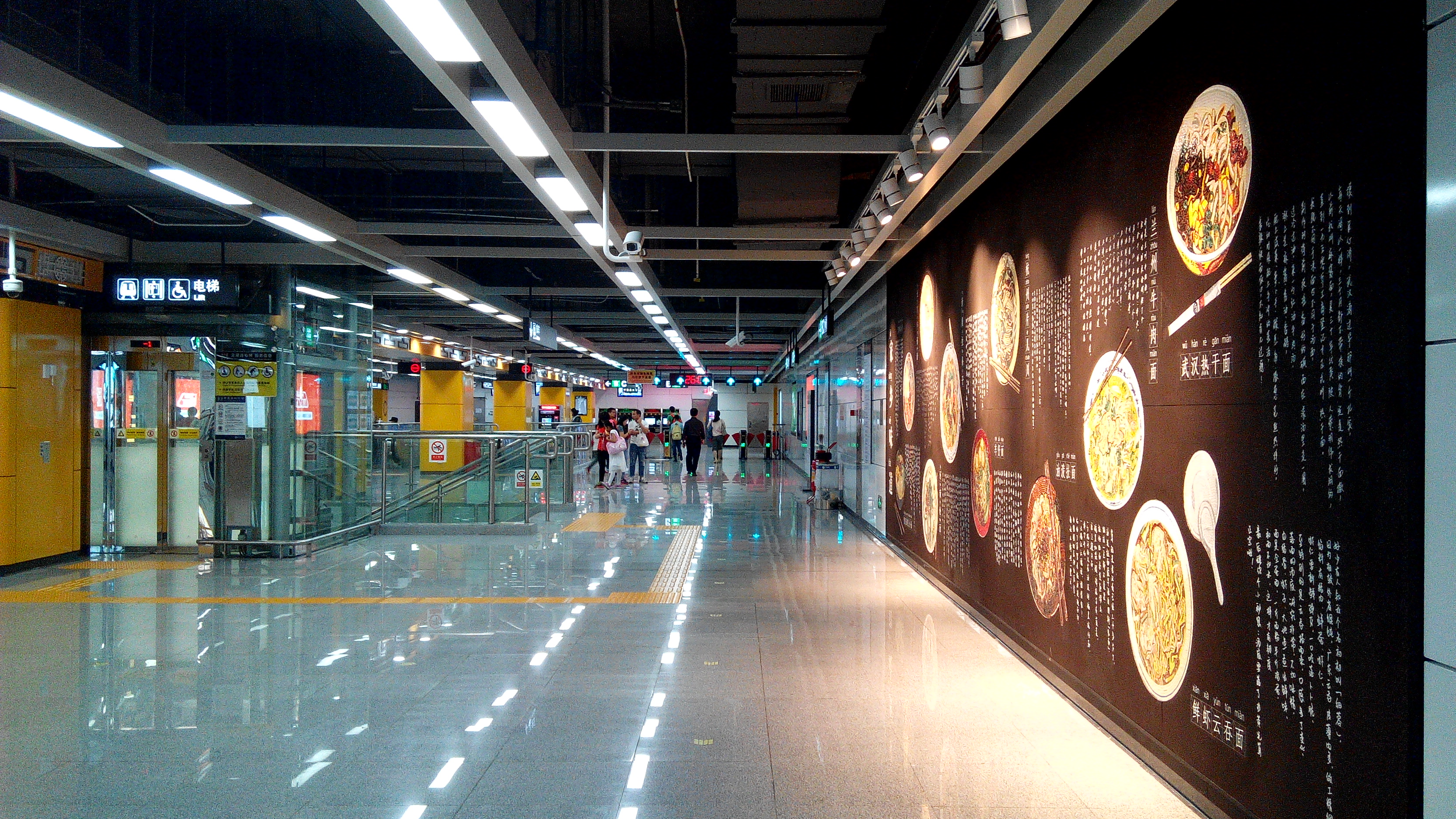
Concourse

Yuanling station (simplified Chinese: 园岭站; traditional Chinese: 園嶺站; pinyin: Yuánlǐng Zhàn; Jyutping: jyun4 ling5 zaam6) is a station on Line 9 of the Shenzhen Metro. It opened on 28 October 2016.

== Station layout ==
G	-	Exit
B1F; Concourse	Lobby	Customer Service, Shops, Vending machines, ATMs
B2F; Platforms	Platform 1	← Line 9 towards Qianwan (Hongling North)
B2F; Platforms	Island platform, doors will open on the left
B2F; Platforms	Platform 2	→ Line 9 towards Wenjin (Hongling) →

== Exits ==
Exit	Destination
Exit A	Bagua 1st Road, Pengsheng Nianhua, Yinquan Building, Zhuangshi Building, Xufei Garden, Bagualing Postal Integrated Building
Exit B	South Side of Sungang West Road (W), Yuanling East Road, Yuanling Xincun, Yuanling Shiyan Primary School, Yuanling Foreign Language Primary School, Baihuayuan Phase II, Yuanling 1st Street Community, West Side of Hongling Middle Road (S), Shenzhen Hongling Secondary School
Exit C	Songyuan North Street, Construction Building, Hongling Park, Baihui Building, Changhong Building, Hongxiang Garden, Hongtao Building, Shenzhen Pengcheng Hospital, Beijing Building, Shenzhen Hongling Primary School
Exit D	Shenzhen People's Procuratorate, North Side of Sungang East Road (E), Jidian Building, Wuzi Konggu Building, Shenzhen Disabled Persons' Federation, Wantong Building, Zhongmin Times Plaza, Shenzhen Arbitration Commission
