= Wenjindu Port =

Port of entry in Shenzhen, China

The Wenjindu Port (simplified Chinese: 文锦渡港) is a land port of China on the Sham Chun River (Shenzhen River), in Huangbei, Luohu, Shenzhen, Guangdong. Its counterpart on the opposite side of the border is the Man Kam To Control Point.

The Wenjindu neighbourhood is served by Wenjin Road, as well as Wenjin station on the Shenzhen Metro. Wenjindu Port, one of the road crossings with the New Territories of Hong Kong across the border, is located in the area.

== See also ==
- Wenjindu Passenger Coach Station

On the opposite side of the border:

- Man Kam To
- Man Kam To Road
