= Line 9 (Shenzhen Metro) =

Metro line in Shenzhen, China

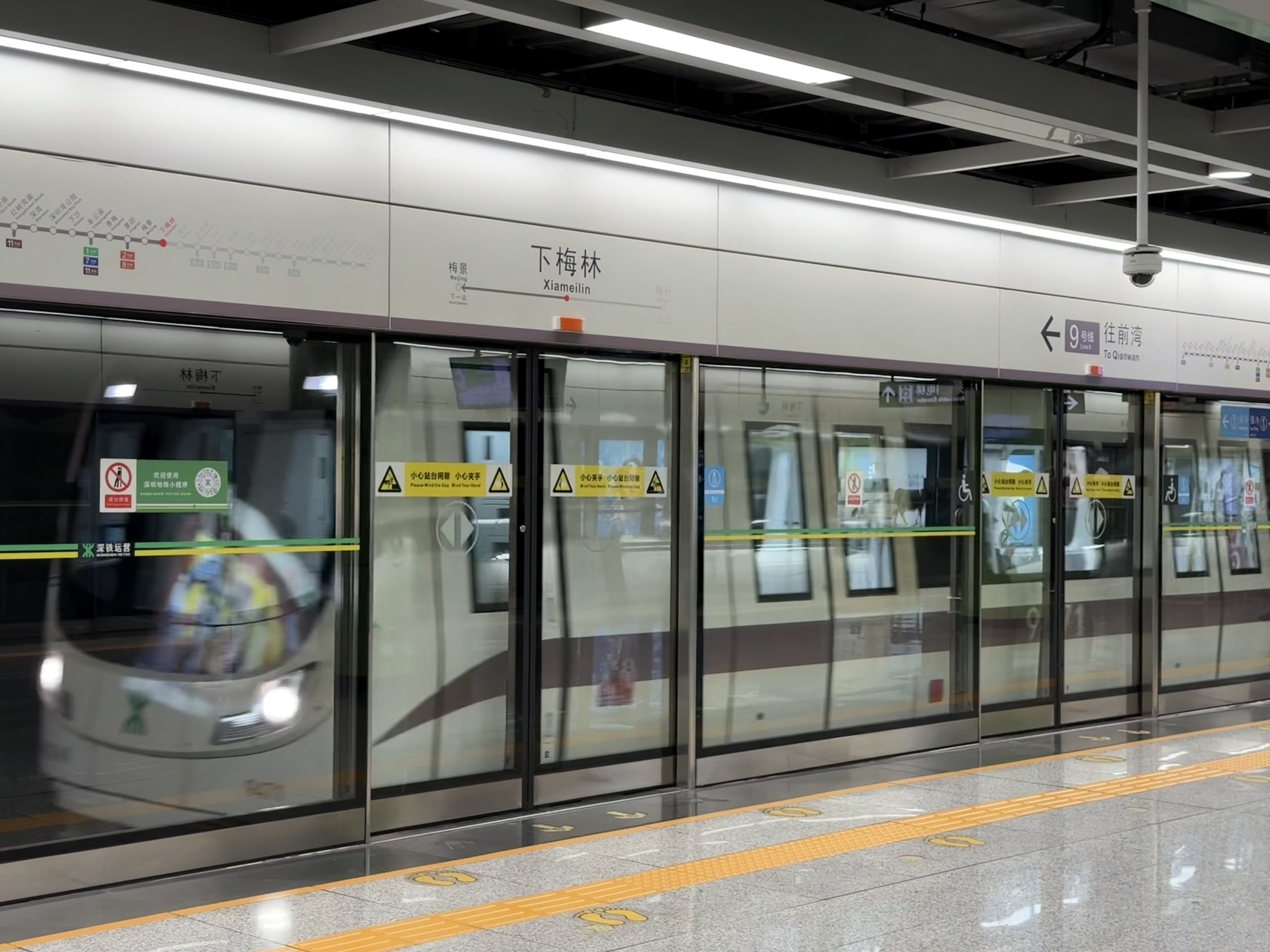
- CRRC Changchun train arriving at Xiameilin station

Overview
- Native name: 九号线; 九號線; Jǐu hào xiàn; gau2 hou6 sin3
- Status: Operational
- Locale: Shenzhen, China
- Termini: Qianwan; Wenjin
- Stations: 32
- Color on map: Gray (#846e74)

Service
- Type: Rapid transit
- System: Shenzhen Metro
- Operator(s): SZMC (Shenzhen Metro Group)
- Depot(s): Qiaocheng East depot Bijia Hill stabling yard
- Rolling stock: CRRC Changchun (901–951)(6A)
- Daily ridership: 384,000 (2018 peak)

History
- Opened: 28 October 2016; 9 years ago
- Last extension: 8 December 2019; 6 years ago

Technical
- Line length: 36.18 km (22.48 mi)
- Number of tracks: Double-track
- Character: Underground
- Track gauge: 1,435 mm (4 ft 8 1/2 in) standard gauge
- Electrification: 1,500 V DC (overhead lines)
- Operating speed: 80 km/h (50 mph)
- Signalling: SelTrac CBTC Moving Block

Line 9 of the Shenzhen Metro opened on 28 October 2016. The line runs East–West from Qianwan to Wenjin. It has 32 stations, including 10 transfer stations and is 36.18 km (22.48 mi) long, running through the city's districts of Nanshan, Futian and Luohu.

== Naming ==
Line 9 was previously known as the Meilin line (simplified Chinese: 梅林线; traditional Chinese: 梅林線; pinyin: Méilín Xiàn; Jyutping: mui4 lam4 sin3), and before that as the Neihuan line (simplified Chinese: 内环线; traditional Chinese: 內環線; pinyin: Nèihuán xiàn; Jyutping: noi6 waan4 sin3), which means an inner ring line. In December 2011 the name was changed along with the planned alignment.

== Construction ==
Construction of Line 9 started in 2012, with main stations completed in July 2014, other stations in March 2015 with tunnels planned for September 2016 and trial operation for October 2016. Shenzhen Metro Line 3 Operations was responsible for construction and planning of the line, until their merger with SZMC (Shenzhen Metro Group) in April 2011.

Segment	Commencement	Length	Station(s)	Name
Hongshuwan South — Wenjin	28 October 2016	25.39 km (15.78 mi)	22	Phase 1
Qianwan — Hongshuwan South	8 December 2019	10.79 km (6.70 mi)	10	Phase 2 (Western extension)

== Stations ==
Station name		Connections	Nearby bus stops	Distance km		Location
English	Chinese	Connections	Nearby bus stops	Distance km		Location
Qianwan	前湾	5				Nanshan; Qianhai
Menghai	梦海					Nanshan; Qianhai
Yihai	怡海					Nanshan; Qianhai
Litchi Orchards	荔林					Nanshan
Nanyou West	南油西					Nanshan
Nanyou	南油	12				Nanshan
Nanshan Book Mall	南山书城					Nanshan
Shenzhen University South	深大南	15				Nanshan
Yuehaimen	粤海门	13				Nanshan
Hi-Tech South	高新南					Nanshan
Hongshuwan South	红树湾南	11 29		0.00	0.00	Nanshan
Shenwan	深湾			0.85	0.85	Nanshan
Shenzhen Bay Park	深圳湾公园		80 339 B706 M347 M453 M463 M486 Seaside-leisure Line	1.50	2.35	Nanshan
Xiasha	下沙		26 34 63 64 80 103 229 236 337 369 382 E4 E6 E17 E26 E37 H92 M105 M106 M133 M194 M347 M453 M463 M519 N10 Peak-express 16（高快16）Peak-time 1（高峰1） Peak-time 19（高峰19） Peak-time 58（高峰58） Peak-time 70（高峰70） Airport 2（机场2）	3.45	5.80	Futian
Chegongmiao	车公庙	1 7 11	21 26 71 79 101 113 202 204 213 222 223 234 303 324 326 338 365 M109 M123 M172 M372 M391 M392 M413 M414 M435 M447 M448 M500 M521 M559 N4 N6 Peak-time 18（高峰18） Peak-time 62（高峰62） Peak-time 119（高峰119）	1.10	6.90	Futian
Xiangmei	香梅		21 65 79 107 108 213 215 222 237 325 365 B733 M109 M183 M372 M391 M441 N6	2.00	8.90	Futian
Jingtian	景田	2 8	11 21 38 41 45 73 79 104 213 222 316 323 328 365 B613 E12 M369 M391 M392 N6	1.35	10.25	Futian
Meijing	梅景		11 12 21 44 58 67 102 201 216 235 334 B613 B689 B912 E18 M203 M204 M222 M240 M312 M358 M364 M390 M398 M460 N12 Peak-time 11（高峰11） Peak-time 22（高峰22） Airport 6（机场6）	0.90	11.15	Futian
Xiameilin	下梅林		44 45 60 67 201 216 222 324 334 374 B821 B912 M204 M207 M312 M460 N9 Peak-time 19（高峰19）	0.75	11.90	Futian
Meicun	梅村		44 45 60 67 201 222 324 334 374 B821 M204 M207 M312 M460 N9 Peak-time 19（高峰19）	1.25	13.15	Futian
Shangmeilin	上梅林	4	44 45 60 102 201 216 218 222 324 334 374 B821 M204 M312 M460 N9 N12 Peak-time 19（高峰19）	0.80	13.95	Futian
Maling	孖岭	10	B821	0.80	14.75	Futian
Yinhu	银湖	6	4 5 7 46 201 207 218 222 336 352 374 393 B614 E11 E24 M193 M203 M240 M358 M360 M364 M435 M437 M454 M460 Dameisha-holiday 2（大梅沙假日2） Peak-time 11（高峰11） Peak-time 13（高峰13） Peak-time 19（高峰19） Peak-time 24（高峰24） Airport 6（机场6）	2.25	17.00	Luohu
Nigang	泥岗		B614	0.90	17.90	Luohu
Hongling North	红岭北	7	5 8 9 23 57 69 79 85 222 237 303 321 323 333 336 375 385 E8 E25 M105 M123 M360 M389 M463 N16 N17 N25 Peak-express 9（高快9） Peak-time 13（高峰13）	1.15	19.05	Boundary between Luohu and Futian (Note: Stations located on Hongling Road, which is the boundary of Luohu and Futian districts, with exits in both districts.)
Yuanling	园岭		7 9 11 13 79 102 107 111 202 213 320 357 375 377 E12 M203 M329 M370 M401 M414 N25 U1 Peak-express 9（高快9） Peak-time 13（高峰13） Peak-time 25（高峰25）	0.70	19.75	Boundary between Luohu and Futian
Hongling	红岭	3	7 10 23 63 64 80 85 108 207 225 393 E8 M152 M183 M360 M401 M463 N6 N10	0.80	20.55	Boundary between Luohu and Futian
Hongling South	红岭南	11 (OSI) (1 2 8 5 via Grand Theater) (Note: Out-of-station virtual transfer to Lines 1 and 2 at Grand Theater.)	7 8 14 23 29 62 63 75 214 377 395 E25 M152 M360 M383 M401 M463 M482 N10 N14	1.00	21.55	Boundary between Luohu and Futian
Ludancun	鹿丹村		8 38 229 337 366 M401	0.80	22.35	Luohu
Renmin South	人民南	1 (via Luohu) (Note: Out-of-station virtual transfer to Line 1 at Luohu.)	1 7 17 38 82 83 97 102 205 306 337 387 N2 N4 N7 N18 Peak-time 73（高峰73）	0.90	23.25	Luohu
Xiangxicun	向西村		5 14 69 83 97 229 336 369 381 387 395 E26 M172 M182 M360 N2 N14 N18	1.00	24.25	Luohu
Wenjin	文锦	Through border control to: Northern Link Man Kam To (proposed)	5 14 69 83 97 229 312 336 381 387 395 E26 M172 M182 M360 M445 N2 N14 N18 Peak-time 97（高峰97）	0.75	25.00	Luohu

== Rolling stock ==
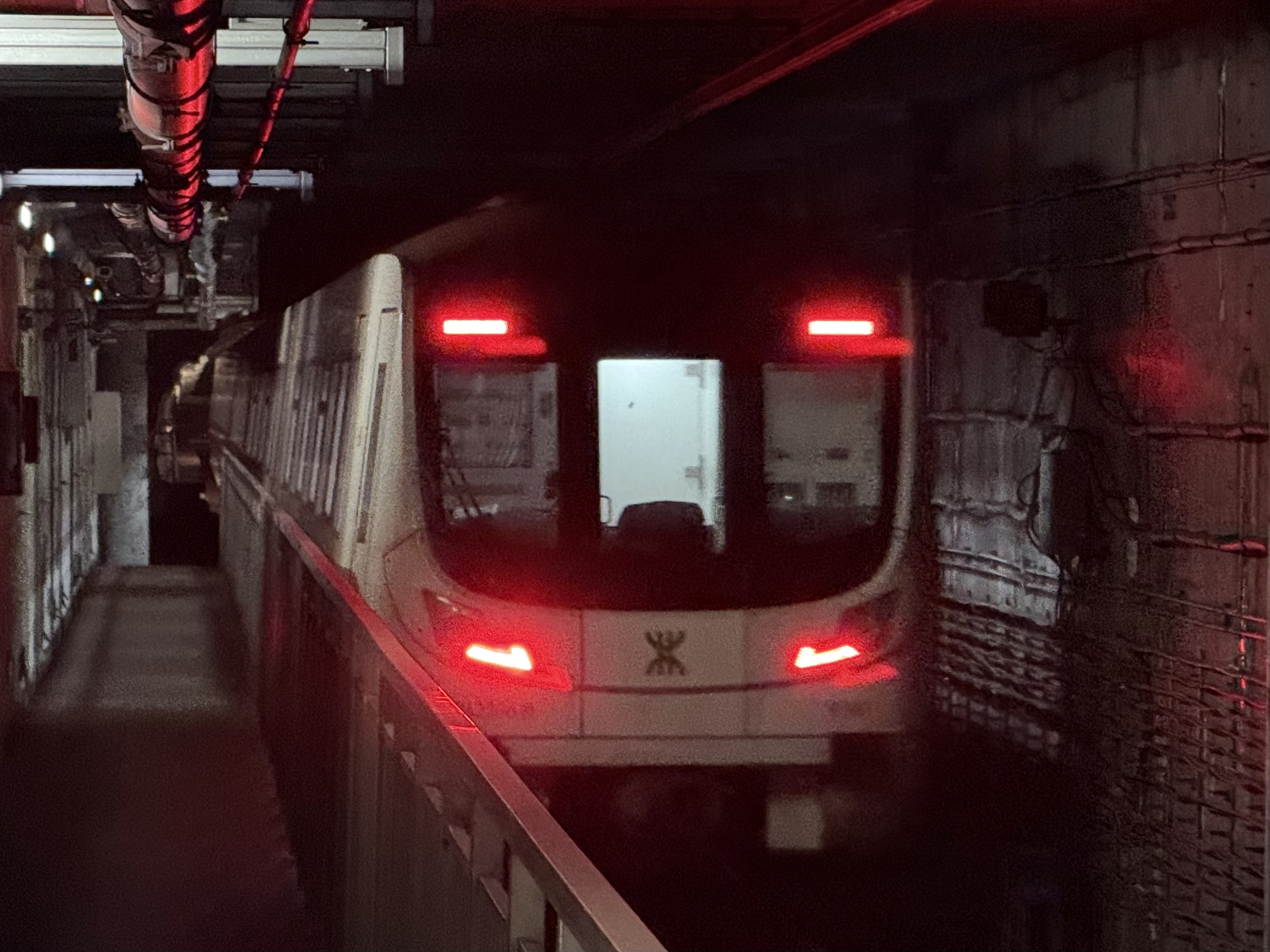
Line 9 train leaving Xiameilin station

In 2014, Shenzhen Metro Group purchased 70 trains (420 carriages) from CNR Changchun Railway Vehicles for the future Line 7 and Line 9, in which Line 7 will use 41 while Line 9 will use 29. The first train arrived in mid-March 2016. 17 trains will assume operations when the line first opens to passengers, departing every 6–8 minutes.

Type	Date of manufacture	Series	Sets	Serial number	Assembly	Notes
Type A	2015–2016	Type A stock	29	0901-0929	Tc+Mp+M+M+Mp+Tc	Manufactured by CRRC Changchun Railway Vehicles, CRRC Times traction system
Type A	2018–2019	Type A stock	22	0930-0951	Tc+Mp+M+M+Mp+Tc	Manufactured by CRRC Changchun Railway Vehicles, INVT traction system
