= Bagualing station =

Metro station in Shenzhen, China

Bagualing 八卦岭
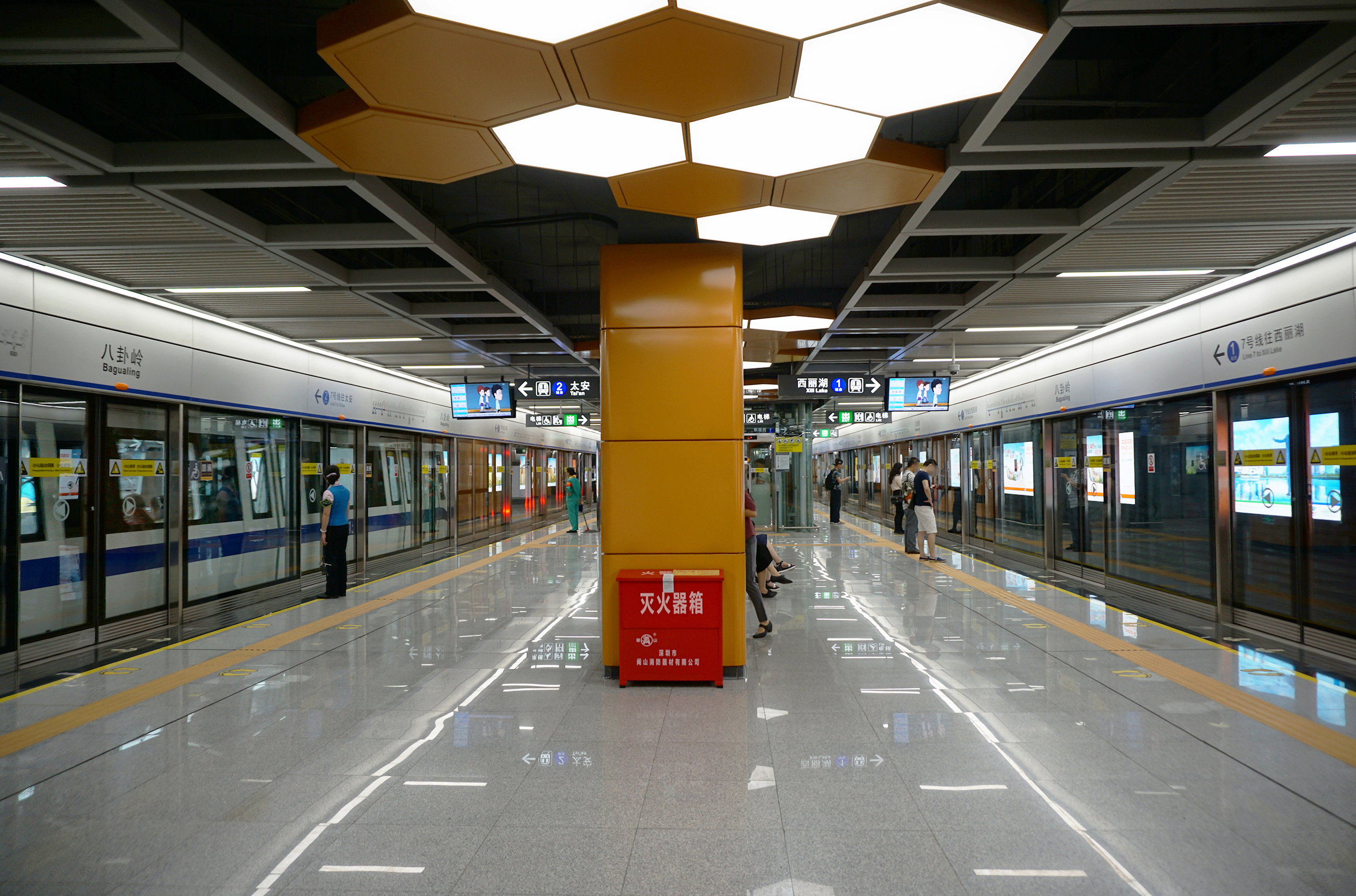
- Line 7 platform

General information
- Location: Futian District, Shenzhen, Guangdong; China
- Coordinates: 22°34′5″N 114°6′4″E
- Operated by: SZMC (Shenzhen Metro Group)
- Lines: Line 6; Line 7
- Platforms: 4 (2 island platforms)
- Tracks: 4

Construction
- Structure type: Underground
- Accessible: Yes

History
- Opened: Line 7: 28 October 2016 (9 years ago); Line 6: 18 August 2020 (5 years ago)

Services
Preceding station	Shenzhen Metro	Following station
Yinhu towards Songgang	Line 6	Sports Center towards Science Museum
Huangmugang towards SZU Lihu Campus	Line 7	Hongling North towards Tai'an
Location

Bagualing station (Chinese: 八卦岭站; pinyin: Bāguàlǐng Zhàn) is a station of Line 6 and Line 7 of the Shenzhen Metro. Line 7 platforms opened on 28 October 2016 and Line 6 platforms opened on 18 August 2020.

== Station layout ==
G	-	Exits A-G
B1F; Concourse	Lobby	Ticket Machines, Customer Service, Shops, Vending Machines
B2F; 7 Platforms	Platform	7 towards SZU Lihu Campus (Huangmugang)
B2F; 7 Platforms	Island platform, doors will open on the left
B2F; 7 Platforms	Platform	7 towards Tai'an (Hongling North)
B3F; 6 Platforms	Platform	6 towards Science Museum (Sports Center)
B3F; 6 Platforms	Island platform, doors will open on the left
B3F; 6 Platforms	Platform	6 towards Songgang (Yinhu)

== Exits ==
Exit		Destination
Exit A		Bagua 1st Road, Bagua 2nd Road, Bagua 5th Street, Ping'an Building, Pengyi Garden, Bagualing Tax Service Hall, Tzuchi Center
Exit B		Bagua 5th Street, Bagua 6th Street, Yuanling Hospital
Exit C		Reserved
Exit D		Beihuan Boulevard, Shangbu North Road, East Side of Nigang Road
Exit E		Shenzhen Stadium, Pengyi Garden, Mint Apart International Hotel (Shenzhen Bagualing Branch), China CITIC Bank, China Minsheng Bank, Chenshi Zhuchang Apartment, Pengji Bagualing Industrial Zone, Shengzhen Pengsheng Community Health Service Center, Dabaihui Office Building, Shengshi Pengcheng Garden, Labour Employment Mansion, Shenzhen Yihua Mansion, Bagua 2nd Road, Shangbu Road
Exit F		Shangbu Road, Bagu 3rd Road, Pengyi Garden
Exit G	G1	Reserved
Exit G	G2	Reserved
