= Luohu, Shenzhen =

Coordinates: 22.5456°N 114.129°E

Luohu 罗湖区
- District
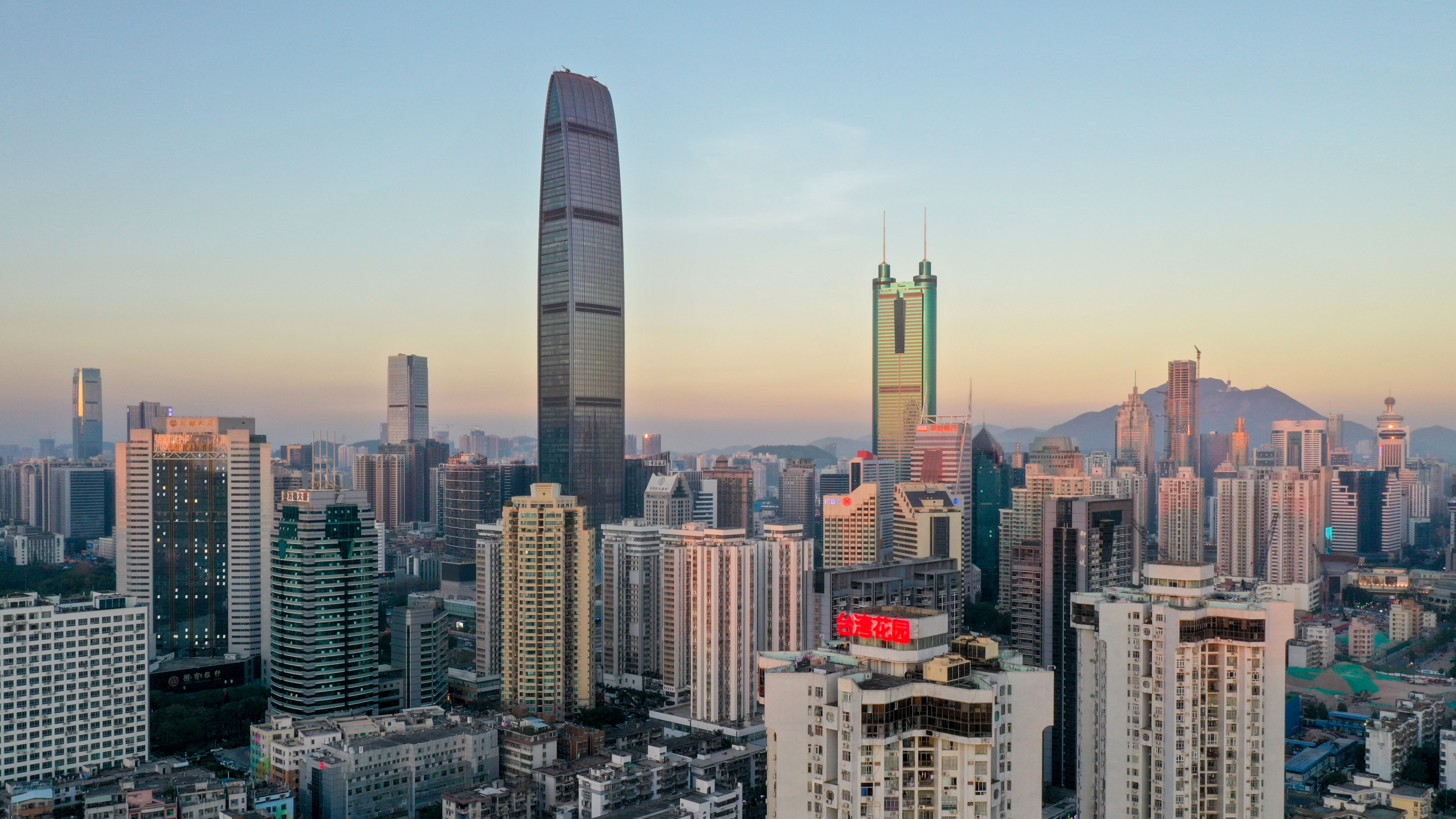
- Skyline of Luohu with KK100 on the left and Shun Hing Square on the right

- Luohu District (the lower center, highlighted in purple) within Shenzhen
- Interactive map of Luohu
- Country: China
- Province: Guangdong
- Sub-provincial city: Shenzhen

Area
  - Total: 78.89 km^{2} (30.46 sq mi)

Population (2020)
  - Total: 1,143,801
  - Density: 14,500/km^{2} (37,550/sq mi)
- Time zone: UTC+8 (China Standard)

Luohu, Shenzhen
- Simplified Chinese: 罗湖
- Traditional Chinese: 羅湖
- Literal meaning: Shell Lake (refers to a mountain)
Transcriptions
Standard Mandarin
- Hanyu Pinyin: Luóhú
Hakka
- Romanization: lo2 fu2
Yue: Cantonese
- Jyutping: lo4 wu4
- IPA: [lɔ̏ː wȕː]

Luohu District is a district of Shenzhen, China, located north of the New Territories of Hong Kong, east of Futian District, southeast of Longgang District, southwest of Pingshan District, and west of Yantian District. It is one of the oldest parts of the city, having represented Shenzhen as a fishing village before 1953 and a market town from 1953 to 1979, when Bao'an County was promoted to a prefecture-level city and renamed Shenzhen.

== History ==
Prior to the establishment of Shenzhen Special Economic Zone (SEZ), an original town called Shenzhen (or Shum Chun; Sham Chun) Hui (Chinese: 深圳墟; pinyin: Shenzhen market) was located within the current Luohu district. It was of size 350,000 m^{2} and has a population of little less than 30,000. The town centred at the present-day Dongmen, where a Tin Hau Temple once stood.

The name Shenzhen was first mentioned in 1410 though the town was only first documented in 1688 but was believed to be inhabited long before this. The market town prospered and expanded out of its boundaries in the early 20th century, following the completion of the Kowloon–Canton Railway, which the town was a stopping station. The town was occupied by Japanese forces between 1942 and 1945. It was promoted from market town to an official town status in 1950. In 1953, the administrative centre of San On County was moved to Shum Chun from Nantou.

After Shenzhen was promoted to city status in October 1979, Luohu district was established as the first district in Shenzhen. Several small mountains were flattened to facilitate its infrastructure during initial construction phases. In November 1997, Yantian area became an independent administrative district.

Some of the tallest and most recognizable buildings in Shenzhen, including Shun Hing Square, KK100 and the Guomao Building are located within the district.

== Geography ==
The size of Luohu district is about 78.9 km^{2} (30 sq mi) and contains 10 subdistricts.

Luohu is located in the southern part of Shenzhen, with Futian district on its west, Yantian district on its east, and Longgang district on its north. The Shenzhen River, which separates the district from North District, Hong Kong forms its southern limits.

It is also one of the six administrative districts of the Shenzhen Special Economic Zone (SEZ) of Shenzhen City of the People's Republic of China.

Luohu has an uneven geography and contains a number of natural fresh water sources, including Donghu (東湖/东湖), Honghu (洪湖), and Xianhu (仙湖), among others. Shuiku (水庫/水库), or "Water Reservoir", is also located in Luohu and is an important source of water for both Shenzhen and Hong Kong.

Shenzhen's highest peak, Wutong Mountain (944m) (梧桐山) is in Luohu District.

The district's west boundary with Futian is Hongling Road, and its east boundary with Yantian is Wutong Mountain.

== Subdistricts ==
Name	Chinese	Hanyu Pinyin	Canton Romanization	Population (2010)	Area (km^{2})
Huangbei Subdistrict	黄贝街道	Huángbèi Jiēdào	wong4 bui3 gai1 dou6	113,382	7.50
Guiyuan Subdistrict	桂园街道	Guìyuán Jiēdào	guei3 yun4 gai1 dou6	82,694	10.90
Dongmen Subdistrict	东门街道	Dōngmén Jiēdào	dung1 mun4 gai1 dou6	90,454	2.10
Cuizhu Subdistrict	翠竹街道	Cuìzhú Jiēdào	cêu3 zug1 gai1 dou6	110,459	3.45
Dongxiao Subdistrict	东晓街道	Dōngxiǎo Jiēdào	dung1 hiu2 gai1 dou6	100,779	3.48
Nanhu Subdistrict	南湖街道	Nánhú Jiēdào	nam4 wu4 gai1 dou6	90,500	2.63
Sungang Subdistrict	笋岗街道	Sǔngǎng Jiēdào	sên2 gong1 gai1 dou6	64,004	4.03
Donghu Subdistrict	东湖街道	Dōnghú Jiēdào	dung1 wu4 gai1 dou6	84,556	29.05
Liantang Subdistrict	莲塘街道	Liántáng Jiēdào	lin4 tong4 gai1 dou6	85,569	13.10
Qingshuihe Subdistrict	清水河街道	Qīngshuǐhé Jiēdào	qing1 sêu2 ho4 gai1 dou6	101,024	13.62

== Immigration Control Point ==
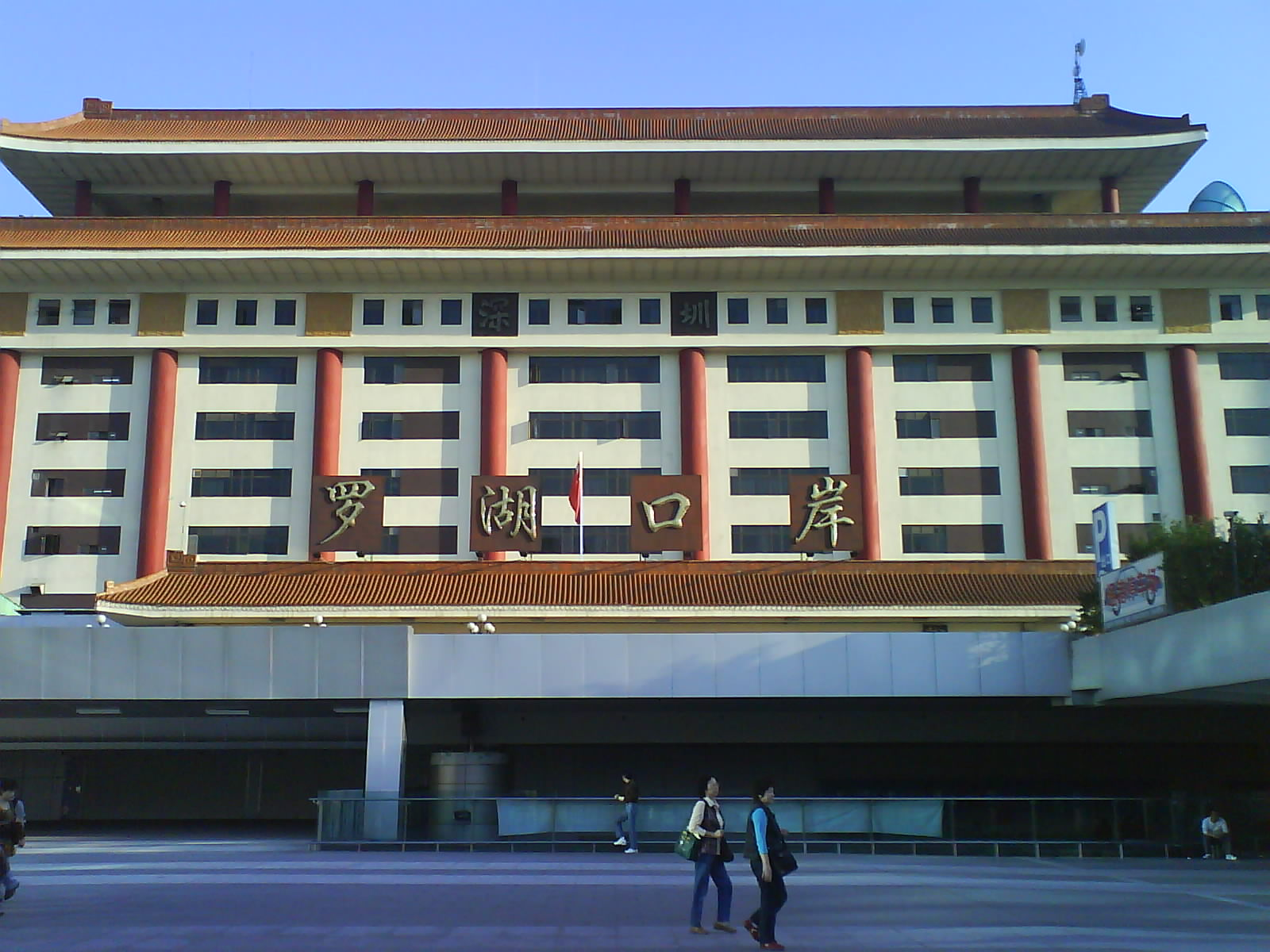
Luohu Immigration Control Point

Luohu serves as an important immigration control between Hong Kong and mainland China. Two immigration control points, Luohu and Man Kam To, are located in the Luohu district. The Luohu immigration point is the busiest land boundary patrol connecting Hong Kong and mainland China. It consists of the Luohu Port on the mainland side, and the Lo Wu Control Point on the Hong Kong side.

== Entertainment ==
=== Shopping ===
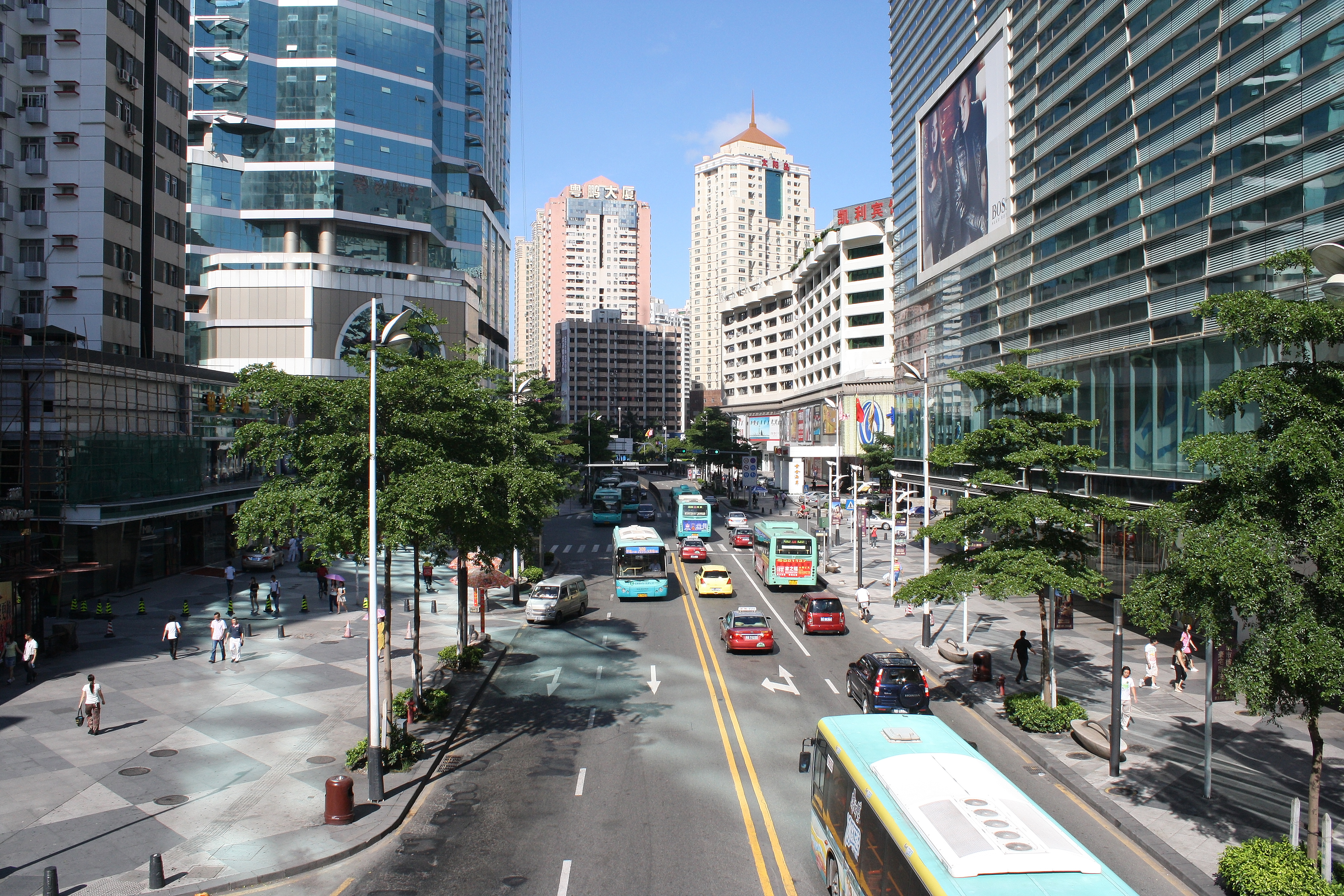
Luohu District

Luohu is known in Hong Kong and Guangdong for shopping. Most one-day visitors from Hong Kong limit their shopping to Luohu Commercial City (羅湖商業城/罗湖商业城), located right outside the Luohu Immigration Control Point, but the areas of Dongmen (東門/东门), Guomao (國貿/国贸), and Diwang (地王) are also important shopping districts.

=== Nightlife ===
Luohu district is also known for its nightlife. Though most expatriates residing in Shenzhen live in Shekou, visitors to Shenzhen from Hong Kong and other places typically frequent bars, KTV (karaoke) lounges, and night clubs in the Luohu area.

== Education ==
As of the end of 2012, there were 221 educational institutions in Luohu District, amongst which 17 were secondary schools.

Schools operated by the Shenzhen city government

- Shenzhen Middle School
- Shenzhen No. 2 Experimental School (深圳市第二实验学校)
- Shenzhen Primary School (深圳小学)

Schools operated by the district government:

- Luohu Foreign languages School
- Cuiyuan Middle School
- Binhe Middle School

== Transportation ==
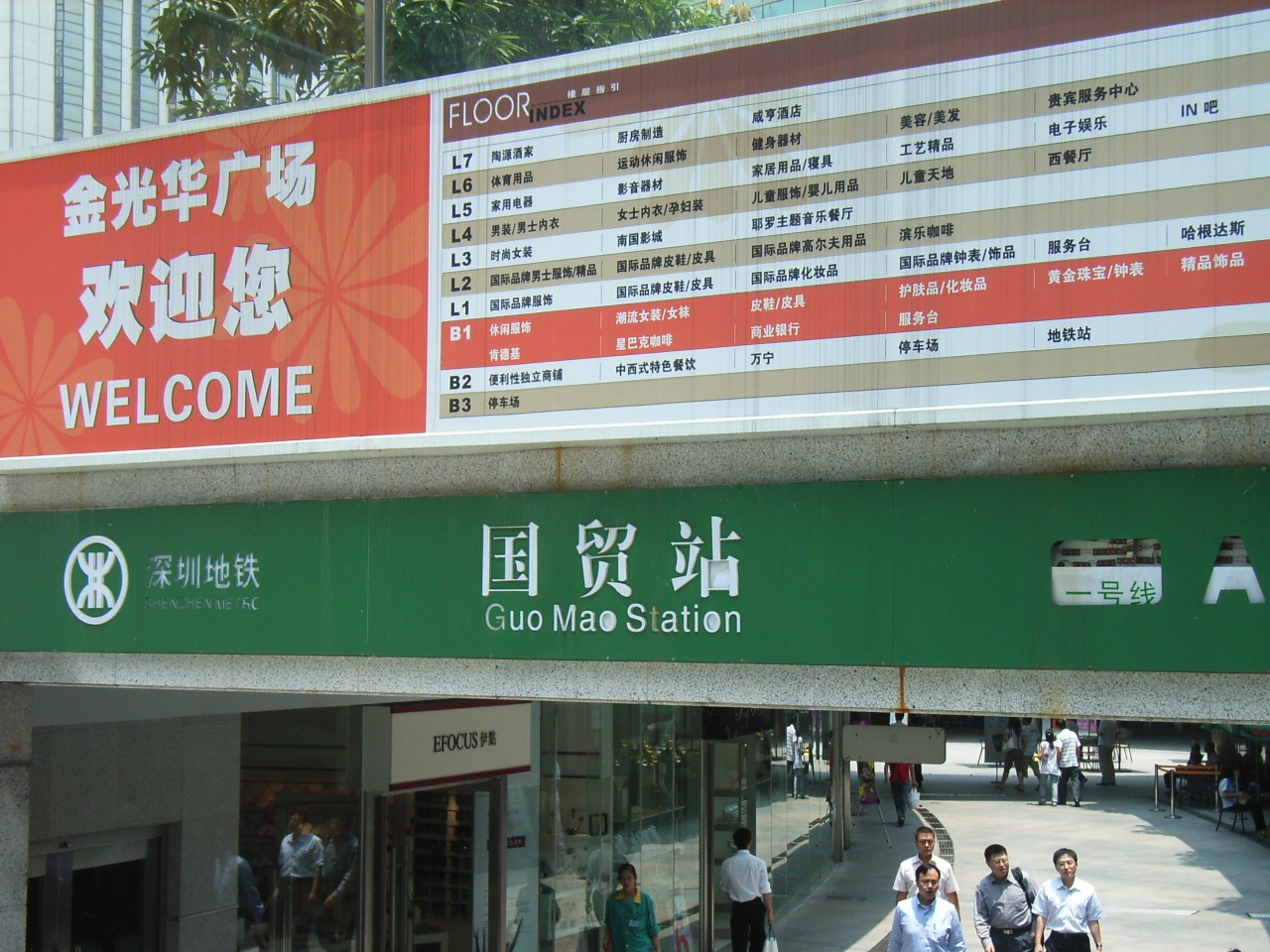
Guomao station is one of Shenzhen Metro stations

Laojie station of the Shenzhen Metro

=== Trunk roads ===
- Shennan East Road
- Dongmen Road (東門路/东门路)
- Yanhe Road (沿河路) and Chunfeng Road Flyover (春風路高架橋/春风路高架桥)
- Nigang Road (泥崗路/泥岗路)
- Luosha Highway (羅沙公路/罗沙公路)
- Taoyuan Road

=== Buses and minibuses ===
Buses and minibuses serve as popular means of transportation modes in Luohu.

=== Shenzhen Railway ===
Shenzhen railway station is located here. It serves as a terminal for train routes towards tens of cities in China.

=== Shenzhen Metro ===
Luohu is currently served by nine metro lines operated by Shenzhen Metro:

- Line 1 – Luohu ( via Lo Wu), Guomao, Laojie 3, Grand Theater 2
- Line 2 – Grand Theater 1, Hubei, Huangbeiling 5, Xinxiu, Liantang Checkpoint, Xianhu Road, Liantang 8
- Line 3 – Laojie 1, Shaibu, Cuizhu, Tianbei 7, Shuibei, Caopu
- Line 5 – Buxin, Tai'an 7, Yijing, Huangbeiling 2
- Line 6 – Yinhu 9
- Line 7 – Hongling North 9, Sungang, Honghu, Tianbei 3, Tai'an 5
- Line 8 – Liantang 2, Wutong Mountain South
- Line 9 – Yinhu 6, Nigang, Hongling North, Yuanling, Hongling 3, Hongling South, Ludancun, Renmin South, Xiangxicun, Wenjin
- Line 14 – Luohu North

== See also ==
- List of tallest buildings in Shenzhen
- Lo Wu (Hong Kong part of the original town of Luohu/Lo Wu within the Frontier Closed Area)
