= Wenjin station =

Metro station in Shenzhen, Guangdong, China

Coordinates: 22°32′55.37″N 114°8′14.8″E

Wenjin 文锦
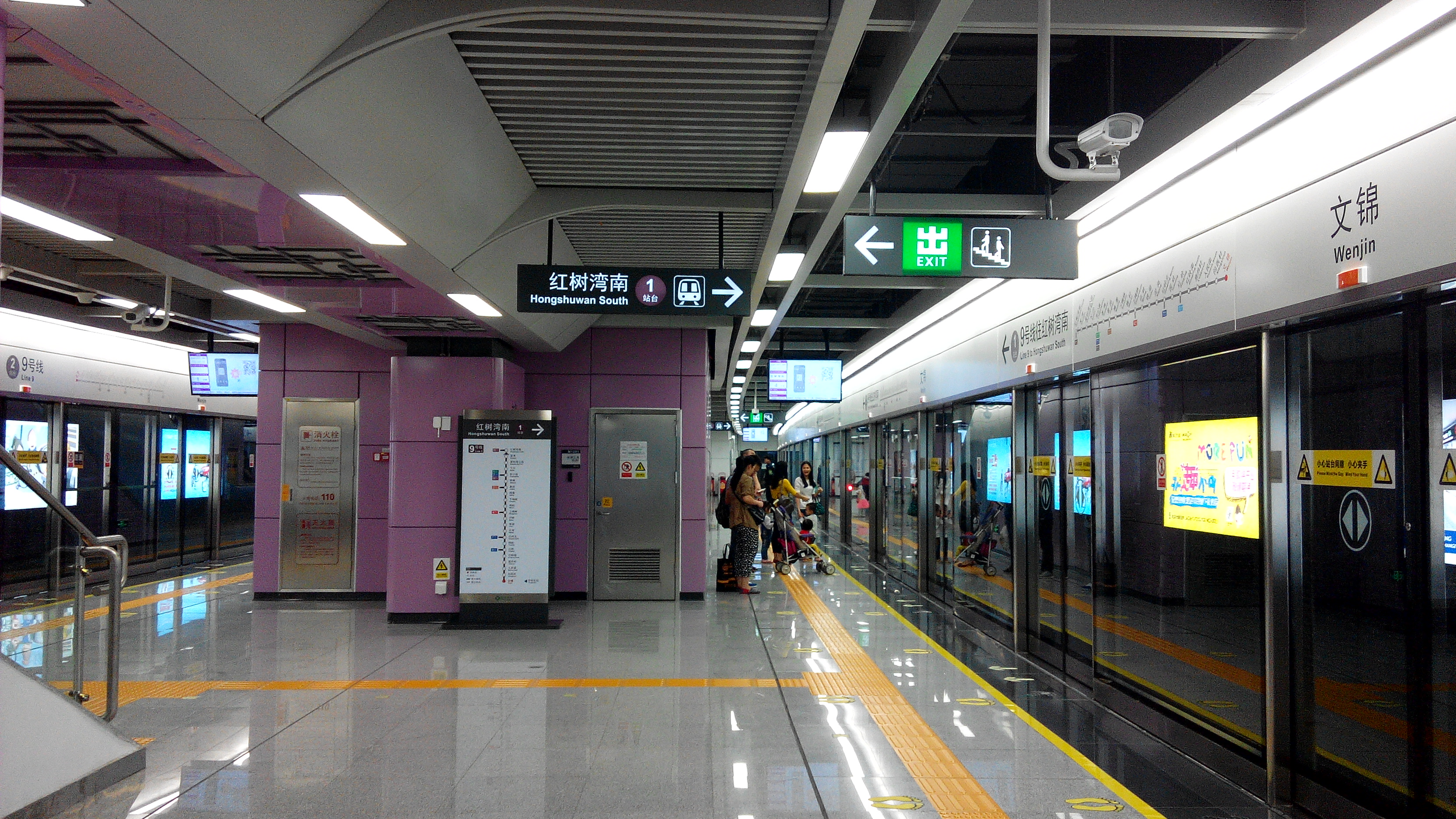

General information
- Location: Luohu District, Shenzhen, Guangdong; China
- Operator: SZMC (Shenzhen Metro Group)
- Line: Line 9
- Platforms: 2

History
- Opened: 28 October 2016; 9 years ago

Services
Preceding station	Shenzhen Metro	Following station
Terminus	Line 9	Xiangxicun towards Qianwan
Track layout
Location

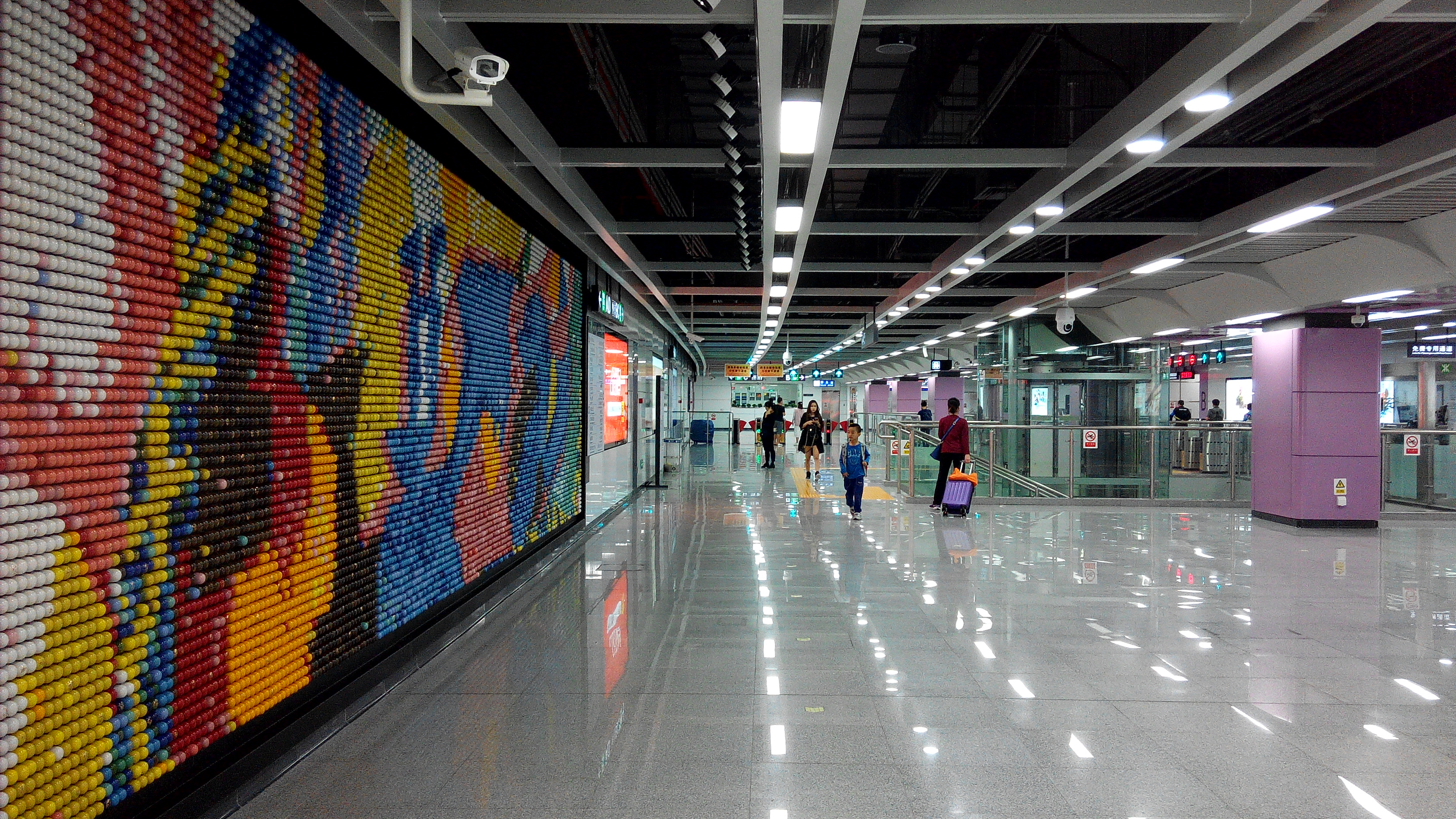
Concourse

Wenjin station (simplified Chinese: 文锦站; traditional Chinese: 文錦站; pinyin: Wénjǐn Zhàn; Jyutping: man4 gam2 zaam6) is a metro station of Shenzhen Metro Line 9. It opened on 28 October 2016. This station is located under the intersection of Chunfeng Road and Wenjin South Road.

== Station layout ==
G	-	Exit
B1F; Concourse	Lobby	Customer Service, Shops, Vending machines, ATMs
B2F; Platforms	Platform 1	← Line 9 towards Qianwan (Xiangxicun)
B2F; Platforms	Island platform, doors will open on the left
B2F; Platforms	Platform 2	→ Line 9 termination platform →

== Exits ==
Exit	Destination
Exit A	Wenjin South Road (W), Chunfeng Road (S), Xin'an Road, Wenjin Middle School, Wenxing Garden, Senwei Building, Yueyun Building
Exit B	Wenjin South Road (E), Large Noble Garden, Liancheng United Building, Jinxing Garden, Wenjindu Port (to Man Kam To Control Point)
Exit C	Wenjin South Road (E), Chunfeng Road (N), Wenjin Building, Jin'an Building, Wenjin Garden, Chang'an Building, Beidou Primary School
Exit D	Wenjin South Road (W), Chunfeng Road (N), Gaojia Garden, Liancheng Meiyuan, Luoohu
