= Qianwan station =

Metro station in Shenzhen, Guangdong, China

Coordinates: 22°31′46″N 113°59′6″E

Qianwan 前湾
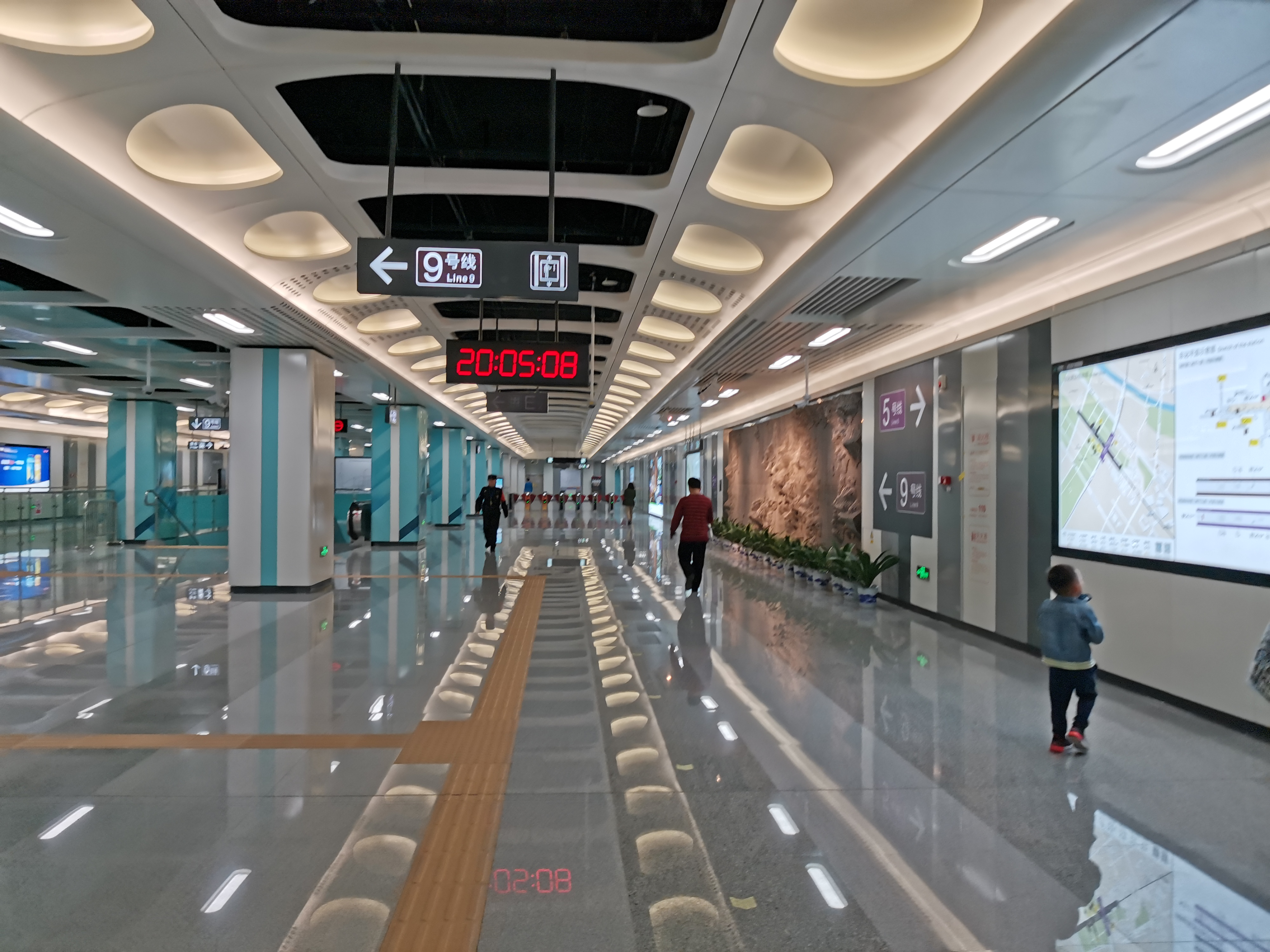

General information
- Location: Nanshan District, Shenzhen, Guangdong; China
- Operator: SZMC (Shenzhen Metro Group)
- Lines: Line 5; Line 9
- Platforms: 4 (2 island platforms)
- Tracks: 4

Construction
- Structure type: Underground
- Accessible: Yes

History
- Opened: 28 September 2019 (Line 5); 8 December 2019 (Line 9)

Services
Preceding station	Shenzhen Metro	Following station
Guiwan towards Grand Theater	Line 5	Qianwan Park towards Chiwan
Menghai towards Wenjin	Line 9	Terminus
Location

Qianwan station (simplified Chinese: 前湾站; traditional Chinese: 前灣站; pinyin: Qiánwān Zhàn; Jyutping: cin4 waan1 zaam6) is an interchange station for Line 5 and Line 9 of the Shenzhen Metro. It opened on 28 September 2019 with Line 5, whilst Line 9 opened on 8 December 2019.

== Station layout ==
G	-	Exit
B1F; Concourse	Lobby	Customer Service, Shops, Vending machines, ATMs
B2F; High Street / Chambers Street Winter Upper Platforms	Platform 1	← Line 9 termination platform
B2F; High Street / Chambers Street Winter Upper Platforms	Island platform, Doors open on the left
B2F; High Street / Chambers Street Winter Upper Platforms	Platform 2	→ Line 9 towards Wenjin (Menghai) →
B3F; Turnham Road / Hereford Delta Animal Lower Platforms	Platform 3	← Line 5 towards Chiwan (Qianwan Park)
B3F; Turnham Road / Hereford Delta Animal Lower Platforms	Island platform, doors will open on the left
B3F; Turnham Road / Hereford Delta Animal Lower Platforms	Platform 4	→ Line 5 towards Grand Theater (Guiwan) →

== Exits ==
Exit	Destination
Exit B	Tinghai Boulevard, Guiwan Park
Exit D	Qiajhai 1st Road, Qianhai Legal Tower, Qianhai Kerry, Haiti Park, Hengchang Technology Building
