= Bao'an Stadium station =

Metro station in Shenzhen, Guangdong, China

Coordinates: 22°33′38″N 113°52′52″E

Bao'an Stadium 宝体
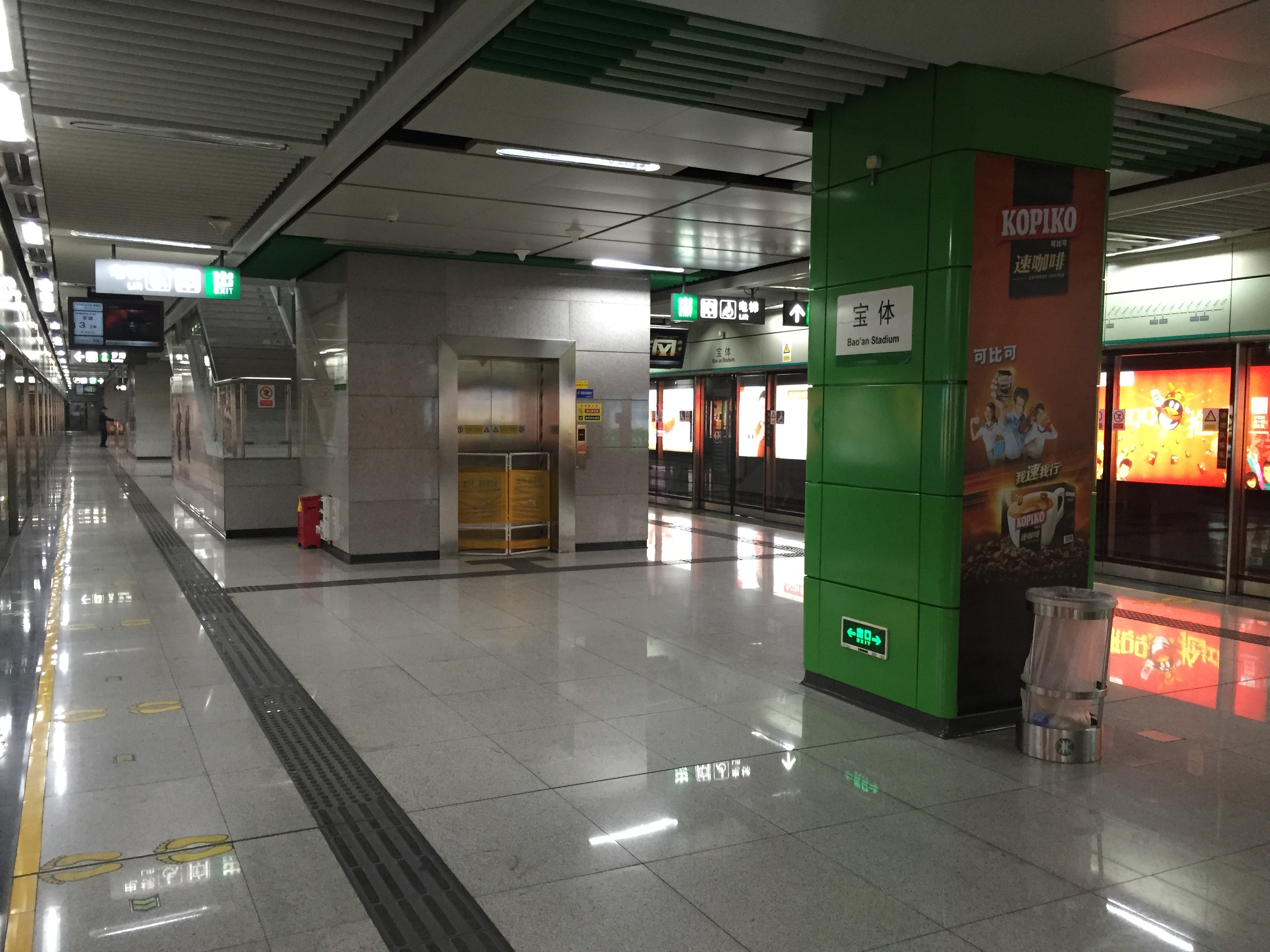
- Interior of Bao'an Stadium Station

Chinese name
- Traditional Chinese: 寶體
- Simplified Chinese: 宝体
Transcriptions
Standard Mandarin
- Hanyu Pinyin: Bāo Tǐ
Yue: Cantonese
- Jyutping: Bou2 Tai2

General information
- Location: Bao'an District, Shenzhen, Guangdong; China
- Operator: SZMC (Shenzhen Metro Group)
- Line: Line 1
- Platforms: 2 (1 island platform)
- Tracks: 2

Construction
- Structure type: Underground
- Accessible: Yes

History
- Opened: 15 June 2011; 15 years ago

Services
Preceding station	Shenzhen Metro	Following station
Pingzhou towards Airport East	Line 1	Bao'an Center towards Luohu
Route map
Location

Bao'an Stadium station (simplified Chinese: 宝体站; traditional Chinese: 寶體站; pinyin: Bāotǐ Zhàn; Jyutping: Bou2 Tai2 Zaam6) is a station on Line 1 of the Shenzhen Metro in Shenzhen, Guangdong Province, China. The station opened on 15 June 2011. The Chinese name 宝体 is short for 宝安体育馆 (Bao'an Stadium, simplified Chinese: 宝安体育馆; traditional Chinese: 寶安體育館; pinyin: Bǎo'ān Tǐyùguǎn; Jyutping: Bou2 On1 Tai2 Juk6 Gun2). The station serves the nearby Bao'an Stadium.

== Station layout ==
G	-	Exit
B1F; Concourse	Lobby	Customer Service, Shops, Vending Machines, ATMs
B2F; Platforms	Platform 1	← Line 1 towards Airport East (Pingzhou)
B2F; Platforms	Island platform, doors will open on the left
B2F; Platforms	Platform 2	Line 1 towards Luohu (Bao'an Center) →

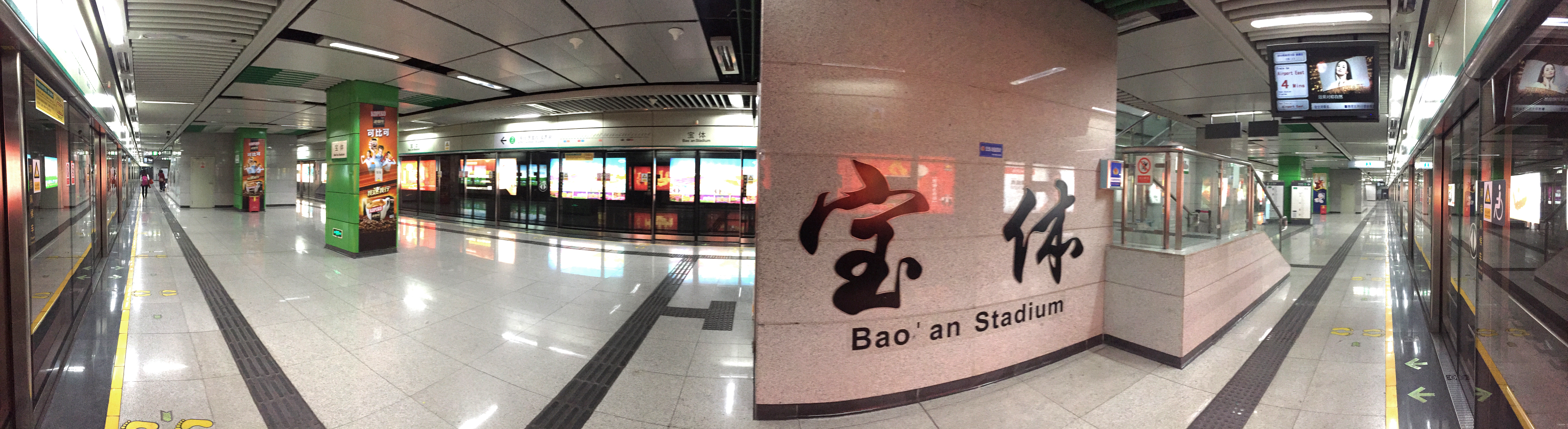
Panoramic of Platform 1（Feb 2015)

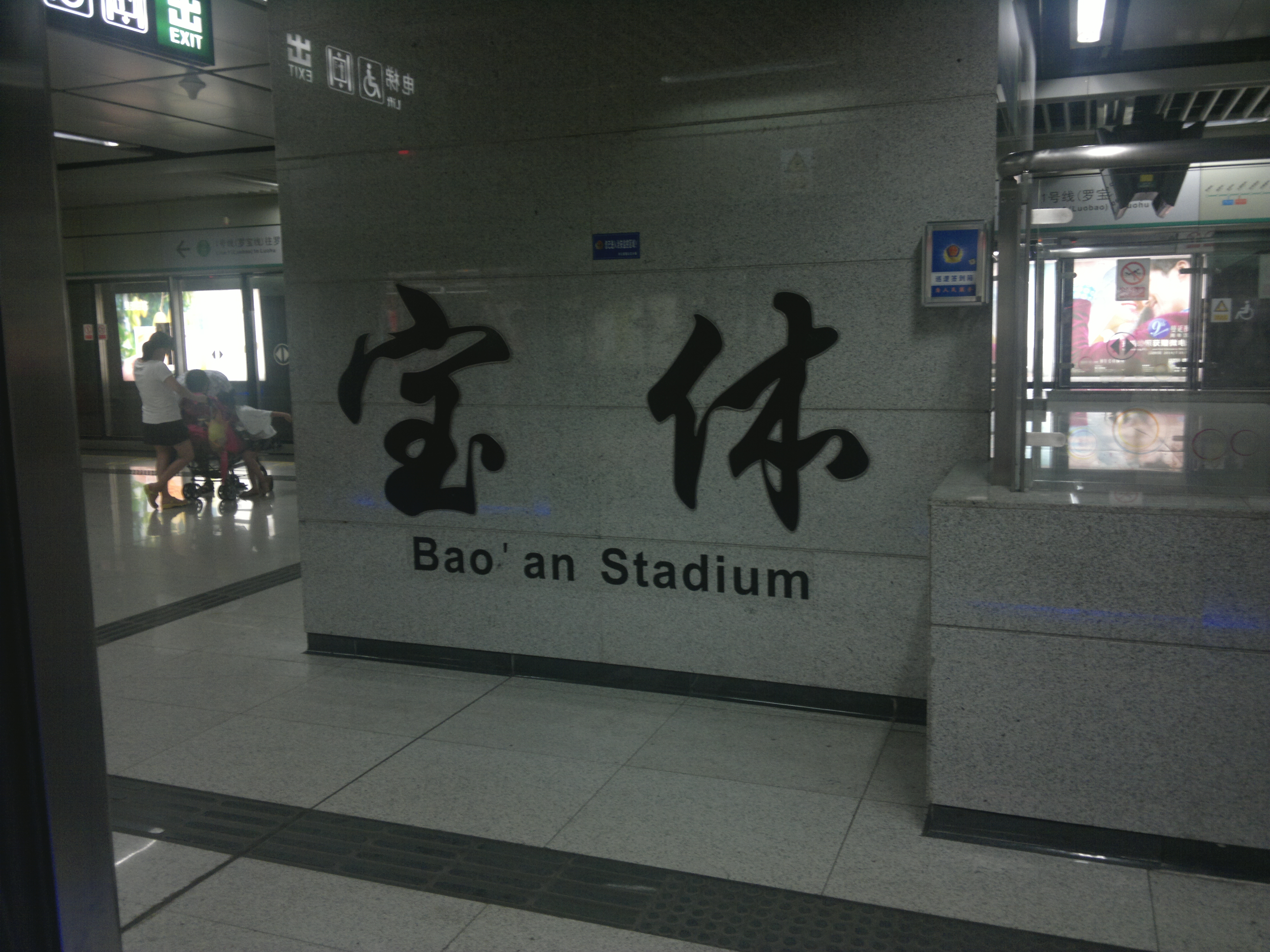
Platform calligraphy

== Exits ==
Exit	Destination
Exit A	Xinhu Road (N), Bao'an Sports Center Natatorium, Bao'an Sports Center, Shangdu, Bao'an SEG
Exit B	Xinhu Road (N), Luotian Road, Dahai Garden, Huayangnian • Huajun, Jincheng Shidai Homestead, Aristocratic Family, Yufeng Garden, Yufeng Industrial Park
Exit C	Xinhu Road (S), Fortune Coast, Xi'an Garden, 5th Avenue, Shenye Xin'anxian
Exit D	Xinhu Road (S), Bao'an District Sports Center Stadium (Zhulin Stadium)
