= Gushu station =

Metro station in Shenzhen, China

Coordinates: 22°36′0″N 113°50′50″E

Gushu 固戍
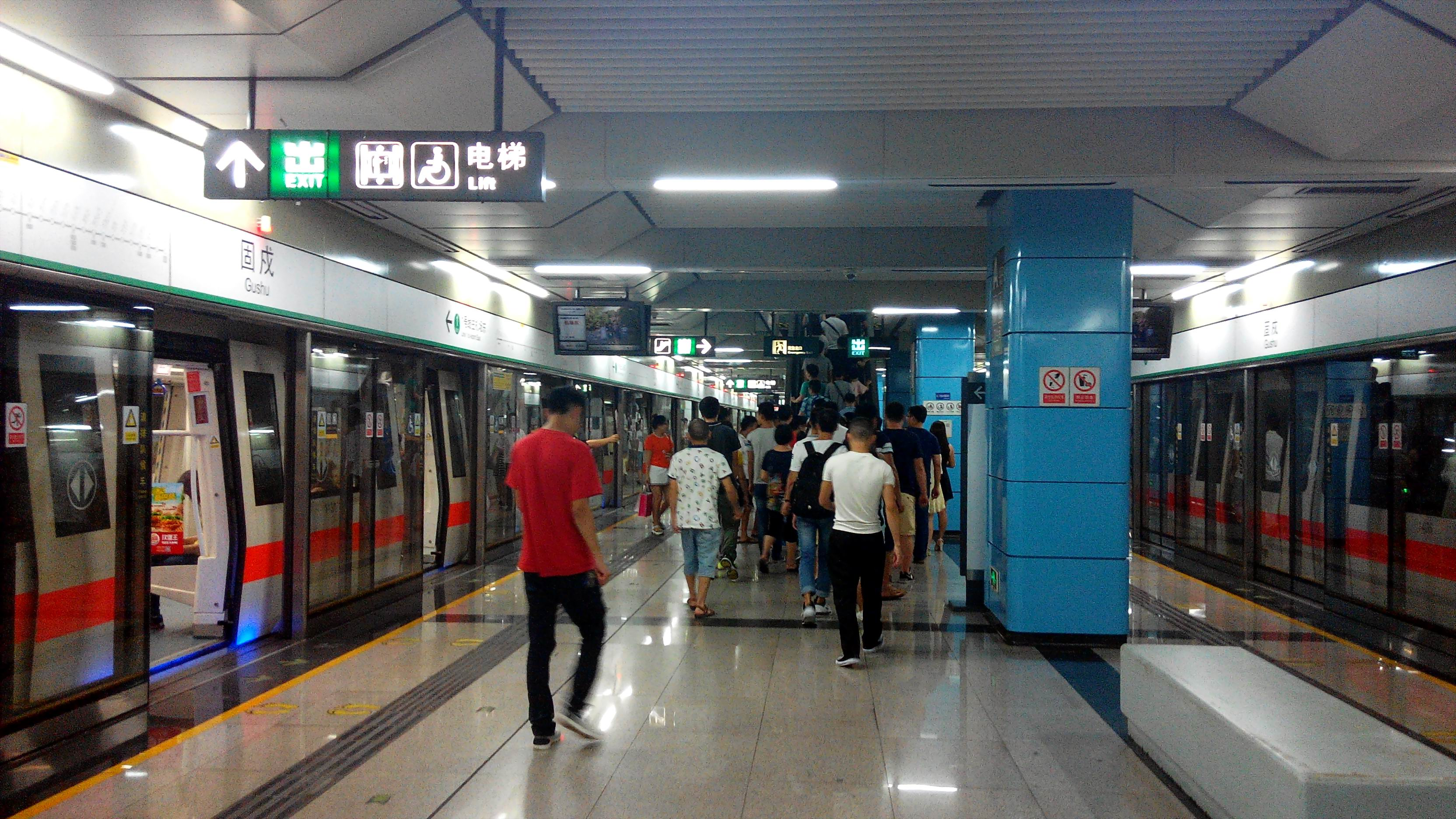

Chinese name
- Chinese: 固戍
Transcriptions
Standard Mandarin
- Hanyu Pinyin: Gù Shù
Yue: Cantonese
- Jyutping: Gu3 Syu3

General information
- Location: Bao'an District, Shenzhen, Guangdong; China
- Operator: SZMC (Shenzhen Metro Group)
- Line: Line 1
- Platforms: 3 (1 island platform and 1 side platform)
- Tracks: 3

Construction
- Structure type: Underground
- Accessible: Yes

Other information
- Station code: 103

History
- Opened: 15 June 2011; 15 years ago

Services
Preceding station	Shenzhen Metro	Following station
Hourui towards Airport East	Line 1	Xixiang towards Luohu
Route map
Location

Gushu station (Chinese: 固戍站; pinyin: Gùshù Zhàn; Jyutping: Gu3 Syu3 Zaam6) is a station on Line 1 of the Shenzhen Metro in Shenzhen, Guangdong Province, China. The station opened on 15 June 2011.

== Station layout ==
G	-	Exit
B1F; Concourse	Lobby	Customer Service, Shops, Vending machines, ATMs
B2F; Platforms	Platform 1	← Line 1 towards Airport East (Hourui)
B2F; Platforms	Island platform, doors will open on the left
B2F; Platforms	Platform 2	→ No regular service
B2F; Platforms	Platform 3	Line 1 towards Luohu (Xixiang) →
B2F; Platforms	Side platform, doors will open on the right

== Exits ==
Exit	Destination
Exit A	Bao'an Boulevard (E), Gushu 2nd Road (S), Songyuan Building, To Fuyong, Shajing, and Songgang, Hangcheng Boulevard (S), Shijie Xincun
Exit C	Bao'an Boulevard (E), Hangcheng Boulevard (S)
Exit D	Bao'an Boulevard (W), Hangcheng Boulevard (S), Huafeng Industrial Park
Exit E	Gushu 2nd Road (N), Bao'an Boulevard (W), Hangcheng Boulevard (S), Huafeng Industrial Park
Exit F	Gushu 2nd Road, Bao'an Boulevard, Xiaweiyuan Xincun
