= Pingzhou station =

Metro station in Shenzhen, China

Coordinates: 22°34′8″N 113°52′14″E

Pingzhou 坪洲
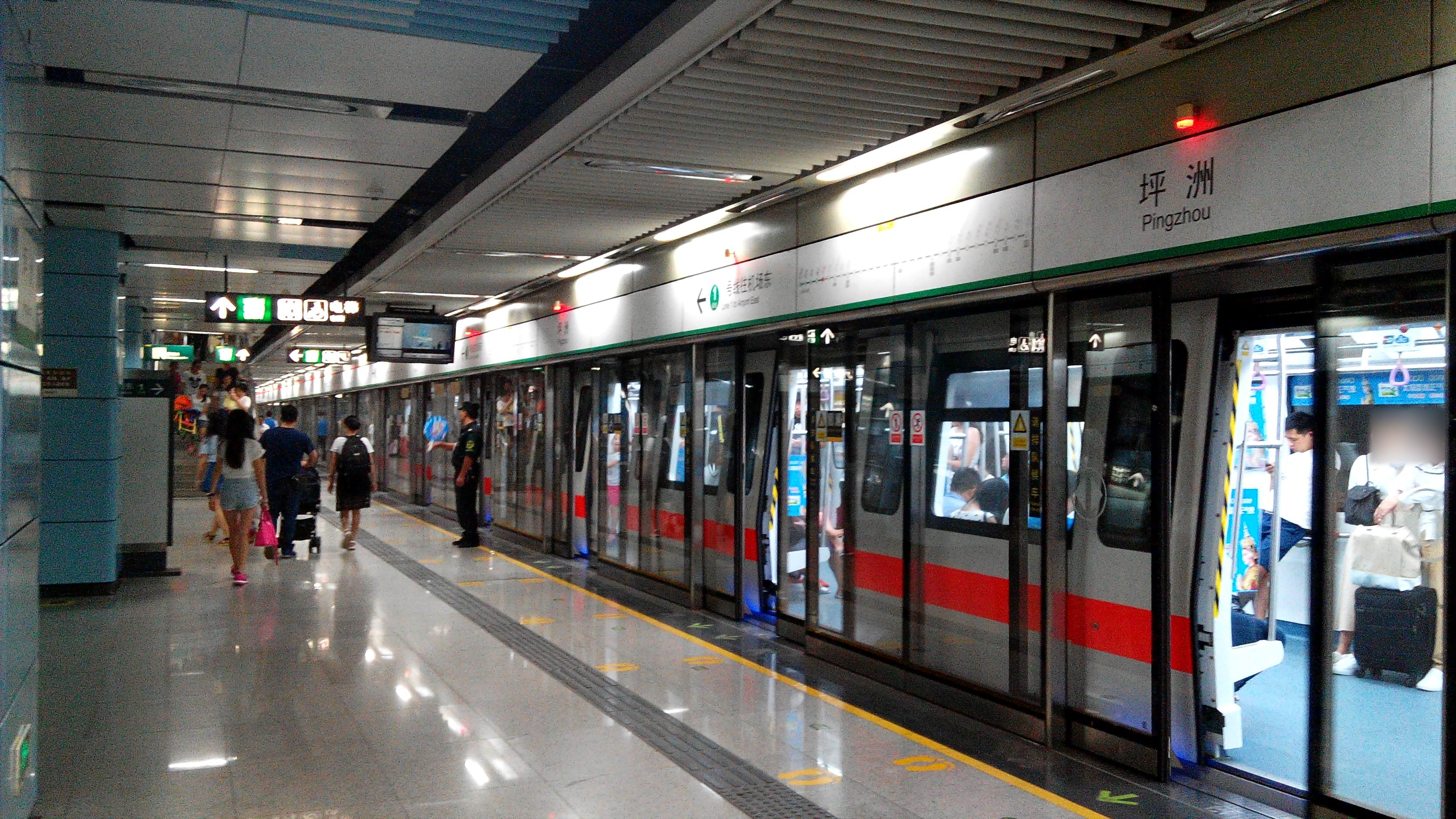
- Interior of Pingzhou Station

Chinese name
- Chinese: 坪洲
Transcriptions
Standard Mandarin
- Hanyu Pinyin: Píng Zhōu
Yue: Cantonese
- Jyutping: Ping4 Zau1

General information
- Location: Bao'an District, Shenzhen, Guangdong; China
- Operated by: SZMC (Shenzhen Metro Group)
- Line: Line 1
- Platforms: 2 (1 island platform)
- Tracks: 2

Construction
- Structure type: Underground
- Accessible: Yes

History
- Opened: 15 June 2011; 15 years ago

Passengers
- 2015: 60,720 daily
- Rank: 6th of 118

Services
Preceding station	Shenzhen Metro	Following station
Xixiang towards Airport East	Line 1	Bao'an Stadium towards Luohu
Route map
Location

Pingzhou station (Chinese: 坪洲站; pinyin: Píngzhōu Zhàn; Jyutping: Ping4 Zau1 Zaam6) is a station on Line 1 of the Shenzhen Metro in Shenzhen, Guangdong Province, China. The station opened on 15 June 2011.

== Station layout ==
G	-	Exit
B1F; Concourse	Lobby	Customer Service, Shops, Vending machines, ATMs
B2F; Platforms	Platform 1	← Line 1 towards Airport East (Xixiang)
B2F; Platforms	Island platform, doors will open on the left
B2F; Platforms	Platform 2	Line 1 towards Luohu (Bao'an Stadium) →

== Exits ==
Exit	Destination
Exit A	Xinhu Road (N), Matou Road, Hedong Road, Pedestrian Street, Xixiang Damen, Jingbeicun, Mabu First Industrial Area, Liutang Interchange, Liutang State Taxation Station, Yatao Garden, Huaqiao Xincun, Kaiping Garden
Exit B	Xinhu Road (N), Mabu Xincun, Laodong Road Crossing, Liutang Primary School, Haiwan Middle School, Xixiang Interchange, Xixiang Sub-district Office, Mabu Neighborhood Committee, Xixiang Gymnasium, Xixiang Inter-city Bus Station, Bao'an Transit Center, Hengsheng Hospital, Laodong Yidui, Yantian Damen, Yintian Xincun, Shengtaosha, Fenghuanggang, Haiwan Mingzhu Garden, Yangguang Garden, Yintian Industrial Area
Exit C	Xinhu Road (S), Haicheng Road, Xixiang Boulevard, Labor Management Office of Xixiang Sub-district, Zhongying Gongxue, Dacha Bay, Baijin Apartment, Haibin Xincun, Haicheng Xincun, Baoyuan Xincun, Shengtaosha Huahailanwan, Laodong Ercun, Laodong Erdui, Huayi Technology, Yangguang Garden, Headquarters Huafeng Science & Technology, F518 Fashion Creative Park, Shengyuan Huating
Exit D	Xinhu Road (S), Matou Road, Xixiang Police Station, Family Planning Office, Yuye Community Neighborhood Committee, First Foreign Language School (Junior Middle Department of Bao'an Senior Middoe School), Xinhu Middle School, Primary School Attached to Bao'an Middle School, Xixiang Dock, Yuyuecun, Xinhu Garden, Haibin Xincun
