= Xixiang station =

Metro station in Shenzhen, China

Coordinates: 22°34′33″N 113°51′44″E

Xixiang 西乡
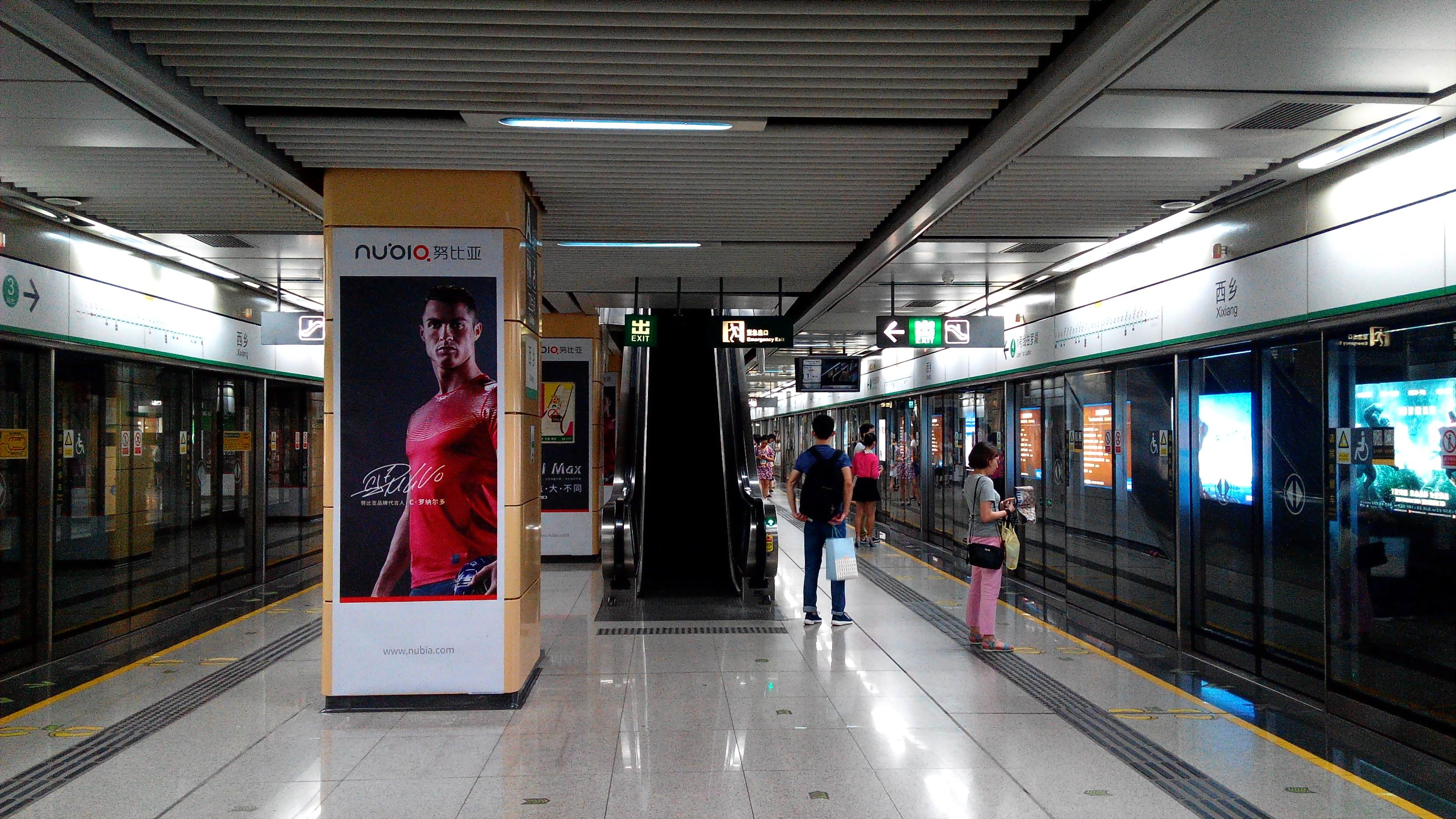
- Interior of Xixiang Station

Chinese name
- Traditional Chinese: 西鄉
- Simplified Chinese: 西乡
- Literal meaning: West hometown
Transcriptions
Standard Mandarin
- Hanyu Pinyin: Xī Xīang
Yue: Cantonese
- Jyutping: Sai1 Hoeng1

General information
- Location: Bao'an District, Shenzhen, Guangdong; China
- Operator: SZMC (Shenzhen Metro Group)
- Line: Line 1
- Platforms: 4 (2 island platforms)
- Tracks: 3

Construction
- Structure type: Underground
- Accessible: Yes

History
- Opened: 15 June 2011; 15 years ago

Services
Preceding station	Shenzhen Metro	Following station
Gushu towards Airport East	Line 1	Pingzhou towards Luohu
Route map
Location

Xixiang station (simplified Chinese: 西乡站; traditional Chinese: 西鄉站; pinyin: Xīxīang Zhàn; Jyutping: Sai1 Hoeng1 Zaam6) is a station on Line 1 of the Shenzhen Metro in Shenzhen, Guangdong Province, China. The station opened on 15 June 2011.

== Station layout ==
G	-	Exit
B1F; Concourse	Lobby	Customer Service, Shops, Vending machines, ATMs
B2F; Platforms	Platform 1	← Line 1 towards Airport East (Gushu)
B2F; Platforms	Island platform, doors will open on the left, right
B2F; Platforms	Platform 2 ↑	← Line 1 termination platform →
B2F; Platforms	Platform 3 ↓	Line 1 towards Luohu (Pingzhou) →
B2F; Platforms	Island platform, doors will open on the left, right
B2F; Platforms	Platform 4	Line 1 towards Luohu (Pingzhou) →

== Exits ==
Exit	Destination
Exit B	Xinhu Road (N), Mabu Xincun, Xixiang Inter-city Bus Station
Exit C	Xinhu Road (S), Gongle Road, Shenzhen Haiwan Middle School, Central Primary School of Xixiang Sub-district, Xiangtiwan Garden, Taihua Sunny Bay, Haiwan Mingzhu Garden
Exit D	Xinhu Road (S), Xixiang Boulevard (W), Bouyuan Xincun, Shengtaosha Junyuan
