= Shenzhen Metro MOVIA EMU =

Chinese electric train

Shenzhen Metro MOVIA 456 EMU
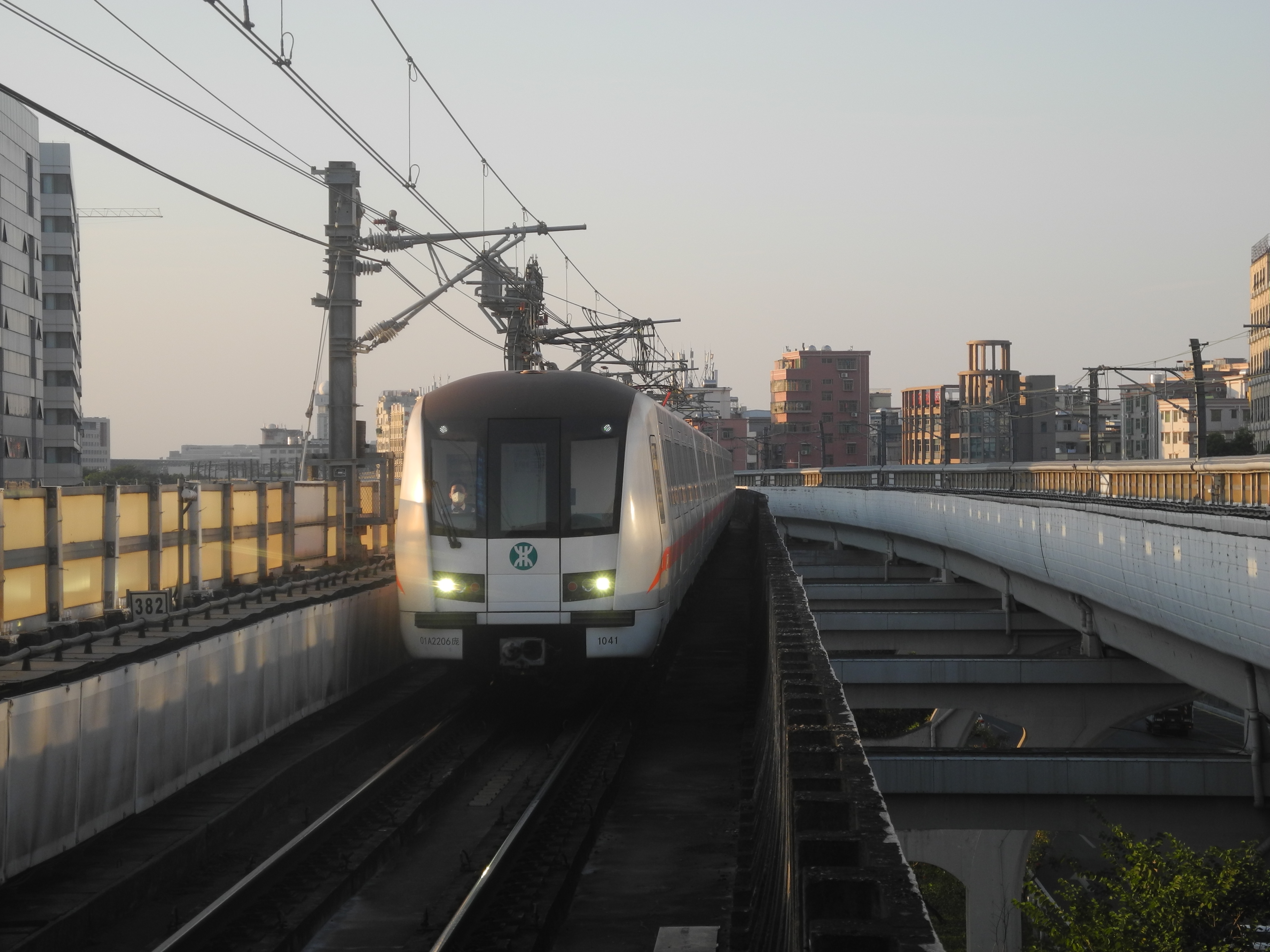
- Set 104 approaching Hourui in November 2021

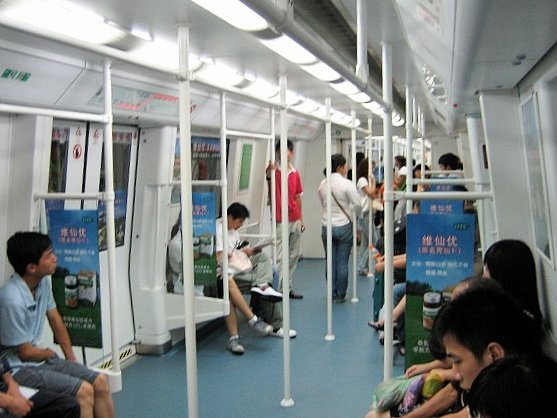
- Interior of MOVIA 456 EMU
- Stock type: Class A EMU
- In service: 2004–present
- Manufacturer: Bombardier Transportation (set 101); Changchun Bombardier Railway Vehicles (Bombardier and CNR Changchun) (set 102–set 122)
- Built at: Germany (set 101); Changchun, China (set 102–set 122)
- Family name: MOVIA
- Constructed: 2004–2005
- Entered service: 28 December 2004; 20 years ago
- Number built: 132 carriages (22 sets)
- Number in service: 132 carriages (22 sets)
- Formation: 6-car sets Tc–Mp–M+M–Mp–Tc
- Fleet numbers: 1011–1122
- Capacity: 2,127 per trainset (207 seated, 1,920 standing)
- Operators: SZMC (Shenzhen Metro Group)
- Depots: Zhuzilin Depot
- Lines served: 1

Specifications
- Car body construction: Aluminum alloy
- Train length: 139.98 m (459 ft 3 in)
- Car length: 24.39 m (80 ft 1/4 in) (Tc); 22.8 m (74 ft 9.6 in) (Mp/M)
- Width: 3.1 m (10 ft 2 1/16 in)
- Height: 3,855 mm (12 ft 7 3/4 in)
- Doors: 5 per side
- Wheelbase: 2.5 m (8 ft 2 in)
- Maximum speed: 80 km/h (50 mph)
- Weight: 228 t (224 long tons; 251 short tons)
- Axle load: 16 t (16 long tons; 18 short tons)
- Traction system: Bombardier MITRAC TC1110 IGBT–VVVF; Modified: Zhuzhou CRRC Times Electric tPower-TN28 IGBT–VVVF
- Traction motors: 16 × Bombardier 4-EBA-4040 220 kW (300 hp) 3-phase AC induction motor
- Power output: 3.52 MW (4,720 hp)
- Power supply: DC-AC
- Electric system(s): 1,500 V DC (nominal) from overhead catenary
- Current collector(s): Single-arm pantograph
- UIC classification: 2′2′+Bo′Bo′+Bo′Bo′+Bo′Bo′+Bo′Bo′+2′2′
- Bogies: Bombardier FLEXX Metro 3100
- Braking system(s): Knorr-Bremse electro-pneumatic brake (service: brake-by-wire; emergency: air brake)
- Safety system(s): Siemens Trainguard LZB-700M ATP
- Coupling system: Scharfenberg
- Track gauge: 1,435 mm (4 ft 8 1/2 in) standard gauge

Shenzhen Metro MOVIA EMU (also known as Movia 456 or "01A2206龐") is the first electric multiple unit of Shenzhen Metro. It is assigned for the service of Shenzhen Metro Line 1. 132 cars were ordered, built by Bombardier Transportation and CNR Changchun Railway Vehicles Co., Ltd.

== Features ==
Shenzhen Metro Group ordered it in November 2001 for Line 1. The 22 sets each consist of 6 cars. The first train was manufactured by Bombardier in Germany, and delivered in Shenzhen on April 23, 2004. The remaining 21 sets were manufactured in Changchun. Compared with the A2 and A3 of Guangzhou Metro and Shanghai Metro AC04, this model of rolling stock uses Faiveley plug doors to reduce noise.
