= Hourui station =

Metro station in Shenzhen, Guangdong, China

Coordinates: 22°37′42″N 113°50′9″E

Hourui 后瑞
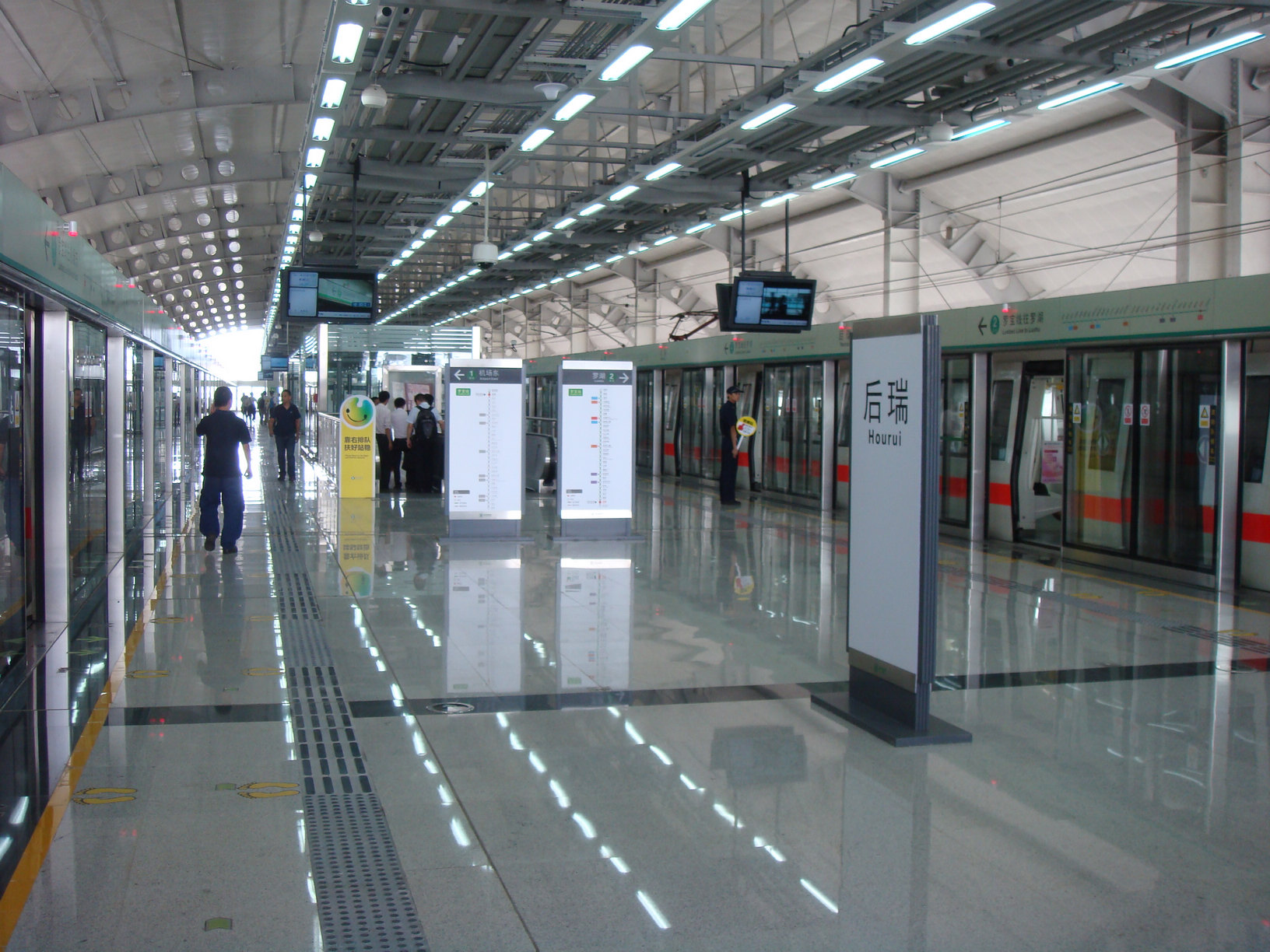

General information
- Location: Bao'an District, Shenzhen, Guangdong; China
- Operator: SZMC (Shenzhen Metro Group)
- Line: Line 1
- Platforms: 2 (1 island platform)
- Tracks: 2

Construction
- Structure type: Elevated
- Accessible: Yes

Other information
- Station code: 102

History
- Opened: 15 June 2011

Services
Preceding station	Shenzhen Metro	Following station
Airport East Terminus	Line 1	Gushu towards Luohu
Location

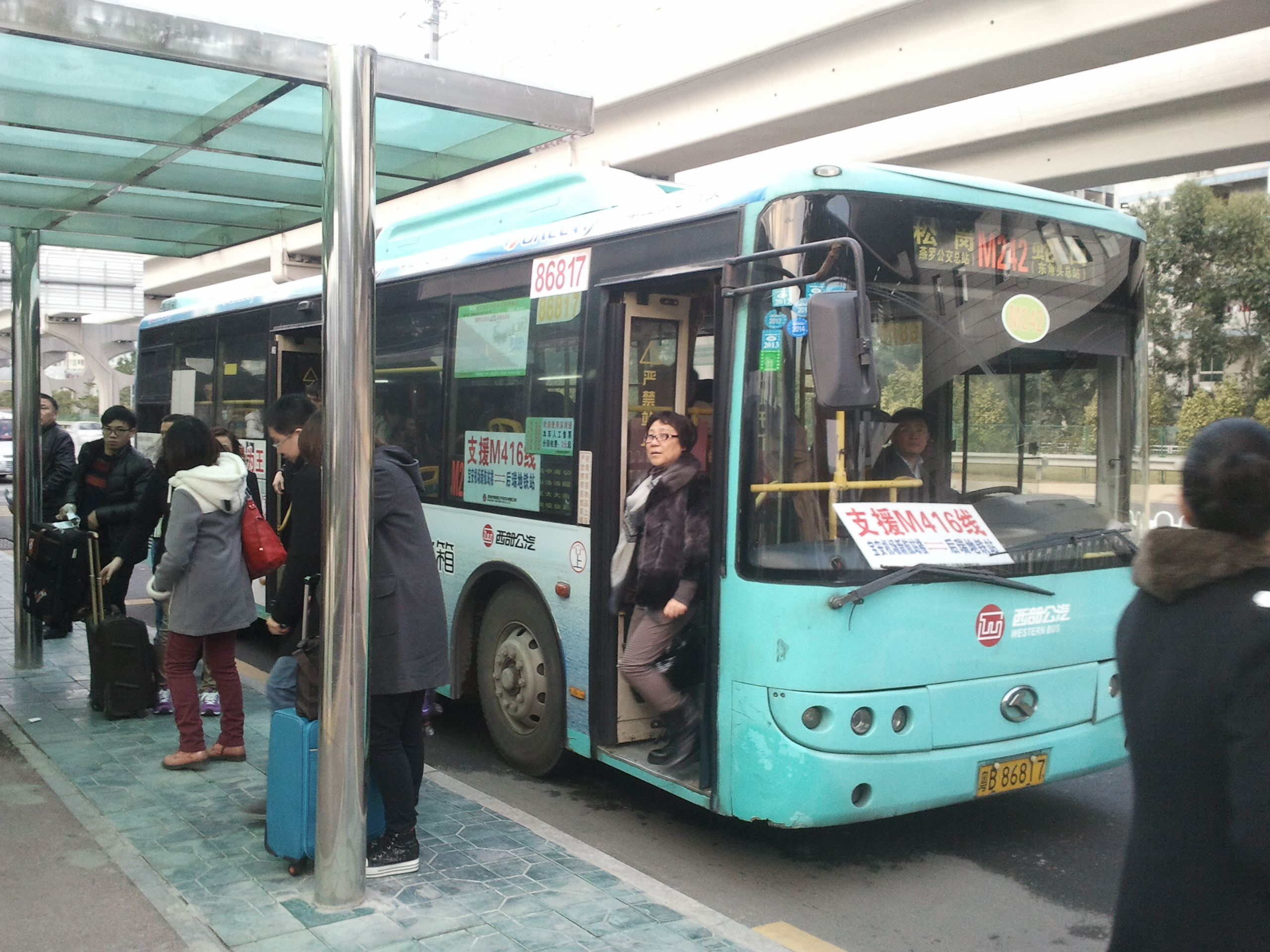
Former shuttle bus to Shenzhen Bao'an International Airport

Hourui station (simplified Chinese: 后瑞站; traditional Chinese: 後瑞站; pinyin: Hòuruì Zhàn; Jyutping: Hau6 Seoi6 Zaam6) is an elevated station on Line 1 of the Shenzhen Metro in Shenzhen, Guangdong Province, China. The station opened on 15 June 2011.

Passenger flights to and from Shenzhen Bao'an International Airport moved to the new Terminal 3 on 28 November 2013, and the old terminals A and B located by Airport East Station were closed. This station served the airport passenger traffic with a connecting bus to Terminal 3 until Airport Station opened.

== Station layout ==
3F; Platforms	Platform 1	← Line 1 towards Airport East (Terminus)
3F; Platforms	Island platform, doors will open on the left
3F; Platforms	Platform 2	→ Line 1 towards Luohu (Gushu) →
2F; Concourse	Lobby	Customer Service, Shops, Vending machines, ATMs
G	-	Exit

== Exits ==
Exit	Destination
Exit A	Bao'an Boulevard (E), Kaicheng 2nd Road (N), Hourui Community Healthcare Center
Exit B	Bao'an Boulevard (E)
Exit C	Bao'an Boulevard (W), Cehangzhan 4th Road
Exit D	Bao'an Boulevard (W), Shenzhen Post Disposal Center, Shenzhen Airport Customs Logistics Centre (B)
