= Line 1 (Shenzhen Metro) =

Shenzhen Metro line

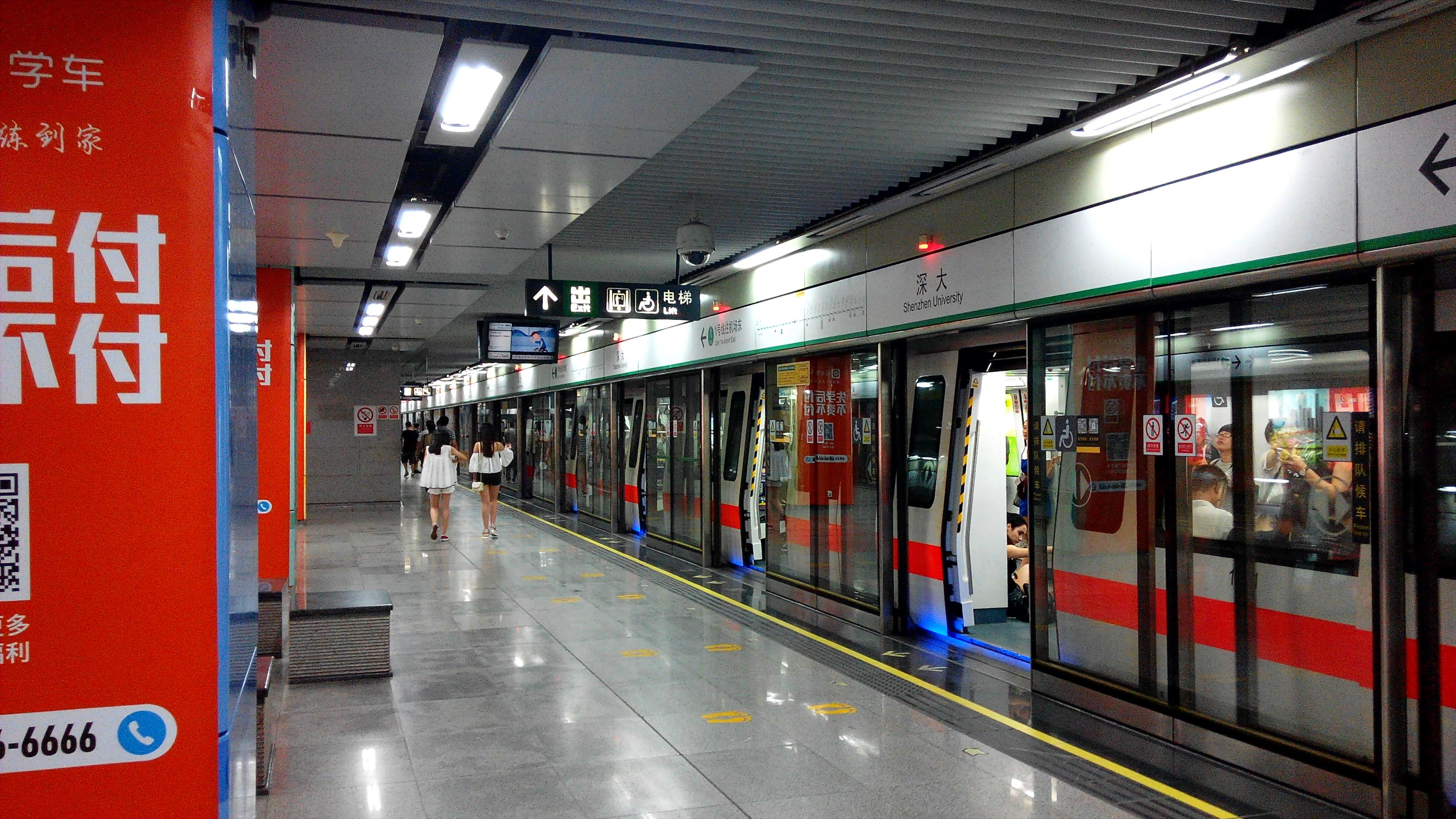
- Train at Shenzhen University station

Overview
- Other names: Luobao line (罗宝线; 羅寶線; Luóbǎo xiàn; Lo4 Bou2 Sin3)
- Native name: 一号线; 一號線; Yīhào Xiàn; Jat1 Hou6 Sin3
- Status: Operational
- Locale: Shenzhen, Guangdong, China
- Termini: Airport East; Luohu
- Stations: 30
- Color on map: Green (#00ab39)

Service
- Type: Rapid transit
- System: Shenzhen Metro
- Operator(s): SZMC (Shenzhen Metro Group)
- Depot(s): Zhuzilin depot Qianhai depot
- Rolling stock: Bombardier MOVIA 456 (101–122)(6A); CRRC Changchun (123–126) (6A); CRRC Zhuzhou (127–185) (6A)
- Daily ridership: 1.01 million (March 2021 average); 1.43 million (2018 Peak)

History
- Opened: 28 December 2004; 21 years ago
- Last extension: 15 June 2011; 15 years ago

Technical
- Line length: 41.04 km (25.50 mi)
- Number of tracks: Double-track
- Character: Underground and elevated
- Track gauge: 1,435 mm (4 ft 8 1/2 in) standard gauge
- Electrification: 1,500 V DC from overhead catenary
- Operating speed: 80 km/h (50 mph)
- Signalling: Siemens Trainguard LZB 700 M FTGS Quasi-moving block

Line 1 (Chinese: 深圳地铁1号线), formerly branded as Luobao line (罗宝线), is the rapid transit line of Shenzhen Metro that runs West–East from Airport East to Luohu. Traditionally, it is the most heavily used metro line on the Shenzhen Metro, serving an average of 960,000 people daily in 2014. It has since been surpassed by Line 5, but still averages over 1 million passengers per day as of March 2021, despite this number being under COVID measures.

== History ==
=== First section ===
Line 1 was the first metro line built in Shenzhen. The first section of the line served Luohu to Window of the World, opening on 28 December 2004. The total length of the first phase is of 17.387 km (10.804 mi), with 15 stations.

=== Renaming ===
On 23 April 2008, the Shenzhen Municipal Planning Bureau renamed Shenzhen Metro Line 1 to 'Luobao line'. The renaming was later reverted in 2013.

=== North west extension ===
On 28 September 2009, Line 1 was extended from Window of the World to Shenzhen University. On 15 June 2011, Line 1 was extended from Shenzhen University to Airport East. The new segment extended the line to 23.622 km (14.678 mi) long and cost 10.606 billion yuan to build.

=== Timeline ===
Segment	Commencement	Length	Station(s)	Name
Luohu — Window of the World	28 December 2004	17.387 km (10.80 mi)	15	Phase 1
Window of the World — Shenzhen University	28 September 2009	3.400 km (2.11 mi)	3	Phase 2 (1st section)
Shenzhen University — Airport East	15 June 2011	20.222 km (12.57 mi)	12	Phase 2 (2nd section)

== Stations ==
Station name		Connections	Nearby bus stops	Distance km		Location
English	Chinese	Connections	Nearby bus stops	Distance km		Location
Luohu	罗湖	GS East Rail line (Note: System transfer via Lo Wu [through border checkpoint].) SZQ; 9 (via Renmin South) (Note: Out-of-station virtual transfer to Line 9 at Renmin South. This transfer will be counted as two separate journeys requiring two fares.); 17 (via Luohu West) (Note: Out-of-station virtual transfer to Line 17 at Luohu West. This transfer will be counted as two separate journeys requiring two fares.)	1 7 8 12 17 18 28 38 61 82 83 97 101 102 108 205 207 215 302 306 309 321 330/Airport 1（机场1） 337 352 387 B842 K538沙井 K538松岗 K545 M373 M401 M468 M508 N2 N4 N7 N14 N15 N16 N18 Peak-time 73（高峰73） Airport 2（机场2）	0.00	0.00	Luohu
Guomao	国贸		1 11 12 14 17 82 83 97 101 102 204 205 211 215 220 229 302 306 307 336 337 351 381 387 E8 K204 M290 M360 M373 M383 M399 M402 M403 M404 M407 M408 M508 M509 N2 N7 N14 N15 N16 N18 N19 N21 Peak-time 73（高峰73）	1.10	1.10	Luohu
Laojie	老街	3 17	3 10 12 14 29 59 64 85 103 104 113 203 204 211 214 215 223 302 309 336 337 351 E8 K113 M399 M402 M481 M482 N3 N4 N6 N14 Sightseeing 1（观光1） Sightseeing 2（观光2）	0.63	1.73	Luohu
Grand Theater	大剧院	2 8 5; 9 11 (via Hongling South) (Note: Out-of-station virtual transfer to Line 9 at Hongling South. This transfer will be counted as two separate journeys requiring two fares.)	3 10 12 29 85 101 103 104 113 203 204 214 215 223 302 E8 K113 K204 M481 N3 N4 Sightseeing 1（观光1） Sightseeing 2（观光2）	0.90	2.63	Luohu
Science Museum	科学馆	6	3 4 8 12 75 113 202 203 204 393 395 B622 K113 M370 M383 M481 N3 N4 330/Airport 1（机场1）	1.43	4.06	Futian
Huaqiang Road	华强路	2 8 7 (via Huaqiang North) (Note: Out-of-station virtual transfer to Lines 2 and 7 at Huaqiang North. This transfer will be counted as two separate journeys requiring two fares.)	3 4 32 75 101 103 104 113 202 203 204 215 216 223 385 391 B812 E5 K113 K204 M344 M369 M374 M383 N3 N4 N12 N17 Peak-express 20（高快20） Peak-time 106（高峰106） Sightseeing 1（观光1） Sightseeing 2（观光2） Sightseeing 3（观光3）	1.00	5.06	Futian
Gangxia	岗厦	10	3 4 9 14 38 62 63 80 103 202 203 225 303 313 317 325 339 357 375 377 379 385 391 E20 M204 M221 M223 M224 M370 M389 M433 M441 M476 M521 N10 N14 Peak-time 3（高峰3） Peak-time 14（高峰14） Peak-time 15（高峰15） Peak-time 71（高峰71） Peak-time 95（高峰95） Sightseeing 4（观光4）	2.04	7.10	Futian
Convention and Exhibition Center	会展中心	4	3 9 34 38 60 62 63 64 80 325 371 373 379 398 E25 K113 K318 K578 M221 M223 M224 M347 M390 M441 M454 M459 M500 M521 N9 N10 Peak-express 26（高快26） Peak-time 14（高峰14） Peak-time 17（高峰17） Peak-time 71（高峰71） Peak-time 95（高峰95） Sightseeing 4（观光4）	0.72	7.82	Futian
Shopping Park	购物公园	3	3 9 64 71 235 325 327 371 373 374 379 398 B709 E1 E20 E25 K318 K359 M221 M223 M224 M441 M454 M459 Peak-time 14（高峰14） Peak-time 17（高峰17） Peak-time 95（高峰95） Sightseeing 4（观光4）	0.66	8.48	Futian
Xiangmihu	香蜜湖		21 65 79 101 113 123 213 215 222 223 234 320 324 326 365 373 383 K318 M372 M391 M392 M414 M447 M448 M488 N4 N4区间 N6 Peak-time 15（高峰15） Peak-time 18（高峰18） Peak-time 62（高峰62）	1.75	10.23	Futian
Chegongmiao	车公庙	7 9 11; 14 20 22 (via Xiangmihu West) (Note: Out-of-station virtual transfer to Line 14, 20 and 22 at Xiangmihu West. This transfer will be counted as two separate journeys requiring two fares.)	21 26 28 32 65 79 101 113 123 202 204 209 213 215 222 223 234 303 324 326 327 328 338 365 372 383 395 K318 M372 M391 M392 M413 M414 M435 M447 M448 M488 M500 M521 N4 N4区间 N6 Airport 9（机场9） Peak-express 13（高快13） Peak-time 15（高峰15） Peak-time 18（高峰18） Peak-time 49（高峰49） Peak-time 62（高峰62） Peak-time 119（高峰119） Peak-time 123（高峰123） Sightseeing 1（观光1）	1.41	11.64	Futian
Zhuzilin	竹子林		21 26 28 49 64 70 101 113 123 202 204 209 213 222 223 234 303 317 320 322 327 338 365 372 373 377 383 B611 B697 B968 E4 E6 E10 E26 H92 K359 K384 K578 M372 M391 M392 M413 M414 M433 M435 M447 M448 M488 M520 M521 N4 N4区间 N6 Peak-express 16（高快16） Peak-time 15（高峰15） Peak-time 18（高峰18） Peak-time 58（高峰58） Peak-time 62（高峰62） Peak-time 70（高峰70） Peak-time 119（高峰119） Sightseeing 1（观光1） Seaside-leisure Line	1.28	12.92	Futian
Qiaocheng East	侨城东		21 26 32 45 79 123 338 369 B706 B968 M391 M398 M487 M488	1.72	14.64	Futian
Overseas Chinese Town	华侨城		21 26 32 79 101 123 204 209 222 223 234 323 324 328 365 369 373 383 390 M398 M433 M435 M487 M488 N4 N6	1.26	15.90	Nanshan
Window of the World	世界之窗	2 8	21 26 32 42 43 66 70 79 90 101 113 123 204 209 222 223 234 323 324 327 338 365 369 373 383 390 392 392区间 395 B795 E10 K578 M222 M372 M388 M398 M413 M425 M433 M435 M448 M486 M487 M488 N4 N4区间 N6 N24 Peak-time 8（高峰8） Peak-time 12（高峰12） Peak-time 74（高峰74） Peak-time 93（高峰93） Peak-time 134（高峰134） Sightseeing 1（观光1） Sightseeing 4（观光4）	1.17	17.07	Nanshan
Baishizhou	白石洲	20 29	21 26 42 43 45 58 66 70 79 90 101 113 123 204 209 223 234 320 323 324 327 328 338 369 383 392 B683 B795 B911 K578 M222 M372 M388 M398 M413 M435 M448 M486 M487 M488 M511 N4 N4区间 N24 Peak-time 12（高峰12） Peak-time 74（高峰74） Peak-time 93（高峰93） Sightseeing 1（观光1） Sightseeing 4（观光4）	0.79	17.86	Nanshan
Hi-Tech Park	高新园	20	19 21 42 45 70 72 79 101 113 204 209 223 234 323 324 327 338 365 369 373 383 390 395 B608 B683 K578 M222 M345 M358 M372 M388 M398 M413 M425 M433 M435 M448 M511 N4 N4区间 N8 Peak-express 7（高快7） Peak-express 22（高快22） Peak-time 8（高峰8） Peak-time 9（高峰9） Peak-time 10（高峰10） Peak-time 12（高峰12） Peak-time 30（高峰30） Peak-time 69（高峰69） Peak-time 93（高峰93） Peak-time 94（高峰94） Peak-time 121（高峰121） Peak-time 128（高峰128） Peak-time 150（高峰150） Sightseeing 1（观光1） Sightseeing 4（观光4） European City Line	1.36	19.22	Nanshan
Shenzhen University	深大	13 20	19 21 36 42 45 49 70 79 81 101 113 204 209 223 233 234 320 323 324 327 328 338 339 365 369 373 383 390 B607 B608 B683 B728 B839 E9 E10 E19 K578 M200 M209 M222 M243 M299 M313 M345 M355 M358 M372 M398 M413 M429 M433 M435 M448 M453 M511 N4 N4区间 N8 T2A Airport 8（机场8） Peak-express 22（高快22） Peak-time 8（高峰8） Peak-time 9（高峰9） Peak-time 11（高峰11） Peak-time 12（高峰12） Peak-time 22（高峰22） Peak-time 30（高峰30） Peak-time 69（高峰69） Peak-time 72（高峰72） Peak-time 74（高峰74） Peak-time 75（高峰75） Peak-time 94（高峰94） Peak-time 122（高峰122） Peak-time 128（高峰128） Peak-time 138（高峰138） Peak-time 150（高峰150） Sightseeing 1（观光1） Sightseeing 4（观光4） European City Line	1.21	20.43	Nanshan
Taoyuan	桃园	12	36 58 74 79 122 204 223 226 331 332 337 369 382 B682 B796 M206 M222 M241 M242 M343 M349 M371 M372 M453 M492 N4 N4区间 Peak-time 122（高峰122） European City Line	2.05	22.48	Nanshan
Daxin	大新	OSQ	36 42 58 201 223 B682 B796 M343 M349 M364 M370 M375 M463 M483 M484 M492 M507 M518 Peak-time 122（高峰122）	1.00	23.48	Nanshan
Liyumen	鲤鱼门		B796 M343 M349 Q-H 3（前海行3） Q-H 3区间（前海行3区间）	1.17	24.65	Nanshan; Qianhai
Qianhaiwan	前海湾	5 11	Q-H 2（前海行2）	0.90	25.55	Nanshan; Qianhai
Xin'an	新安		718 B630 B828 B973 M235 M379	1.25	26.80	Bao'an
Bao'an Center	宝安中心	5	B630 B826 B973 M350 M375 M376 M377 M470 M473	1.06	27.86	Bao'an
Bao'an Stadium	宝体		707 B828 M250 M330 M350 M375 M377 M470 M473 Peak-time 122（高峰122）	0.88	28.74	Bao'an
Pingzhou	坪洲	15	320 613 630 631 B631 B847 M210 M330 M350 M377 M382 M470 M507 M522 Peak-express 21（高快21） Peak-express 22（高快22） Peak-time 67（高峰67） Peak-time 146（高峰146）	1.45	30.19	Bao'an
Xixiang	西乡		613 718 B847 B914 M377 M400 M470 Peak-express 21（高快21） Peak-express 22（高快22）	1.10	31.29	Bao'an
Gushu	固戍		338 615 B778 B874 B887 B888 M245 M247 M259 M393 M433 M473 M522 T2A Airport 10（机场10） Peak-express 21（高快21） Peak-time 26（高峰26） Peak-time 30（高峰30） Peak-time 82（高峰82）	3.30	34.59	Bao'an
Hourui	后瑞		338 615 B804 B827 B905 M249 M416 M419 M433 Peak-time 30（高峰30）	3.35	37.94	Bao'an
Airport East	机场东	12 20	327 727 B875 B929 M237 M291 M331 M332 M334 M351 M387 M387区间 M472 Peak-time 30（高峰30）	2.49	40.43	Bao'an

== Rolling stock ==
Type	Date of manufacture	Series	Sets	Serial number	Assembly	Notes
Type A	2001	A-size stock	22	101–122	Tc+Mp+M+M+Mp+Tc	Manufactured by Changchun Railway Vehicles and Bombardier Transportation
Type A	2008	A-size stock	4	123–126	Tc+Mp+M+M+Mp+Tc	Manufactured by Changchun Railway Vehicles.
Type A	2007–2010	A-size stock	26	127–152	Tc+Mp+M+M+Mp+Tc	Manufactured by Zhuzhou Electric Locomotive Works, Siemens traction system
Type A	2014–2015	A-size stock	33	153–185	Tc+Mp+M+M+Mp+Tc	Manufactured by Zhuzhou Electric Locomotive Works, CSR Times traction system

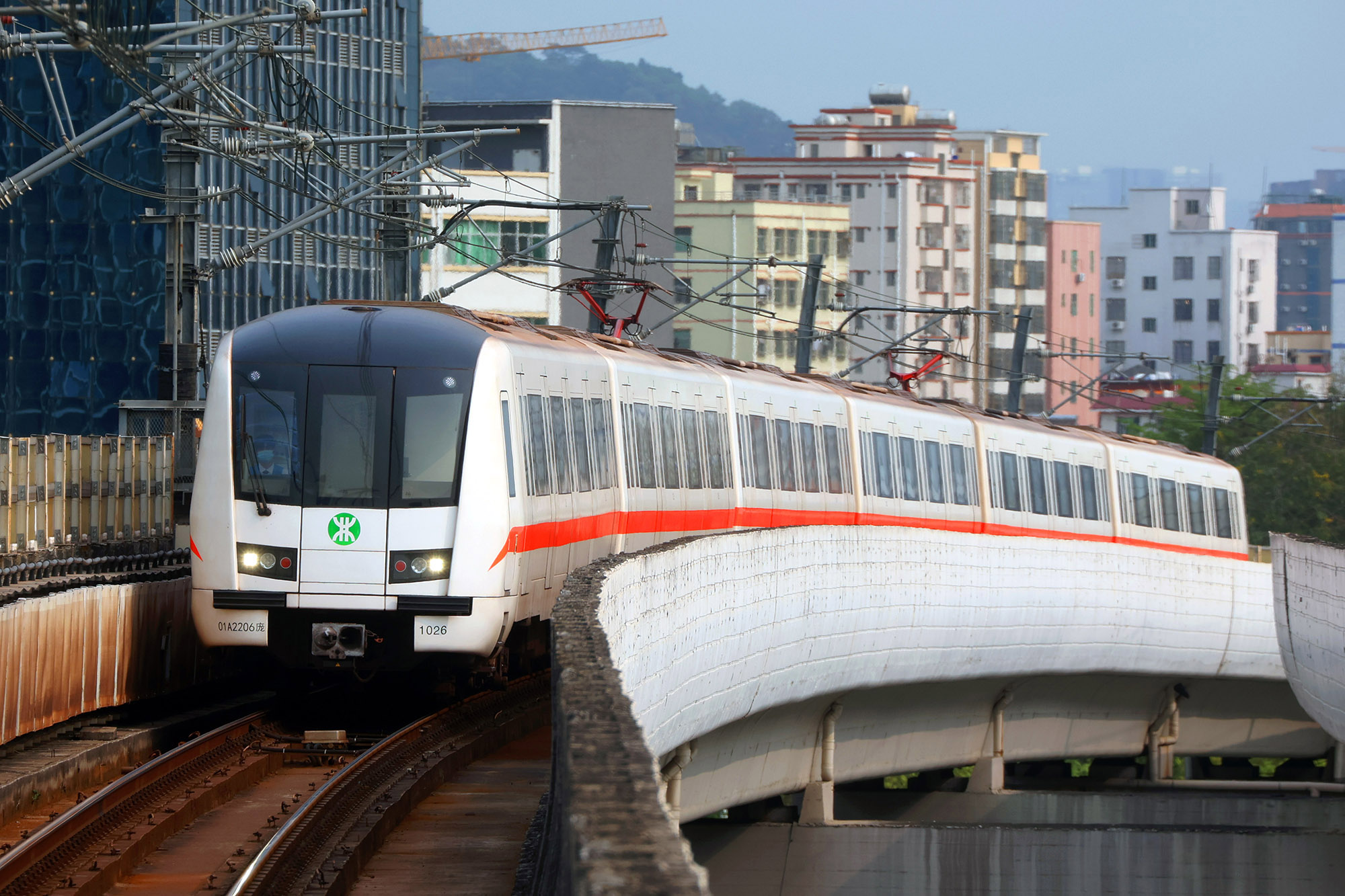
Changchun Railway Vehicles and Bombardier Transportation train

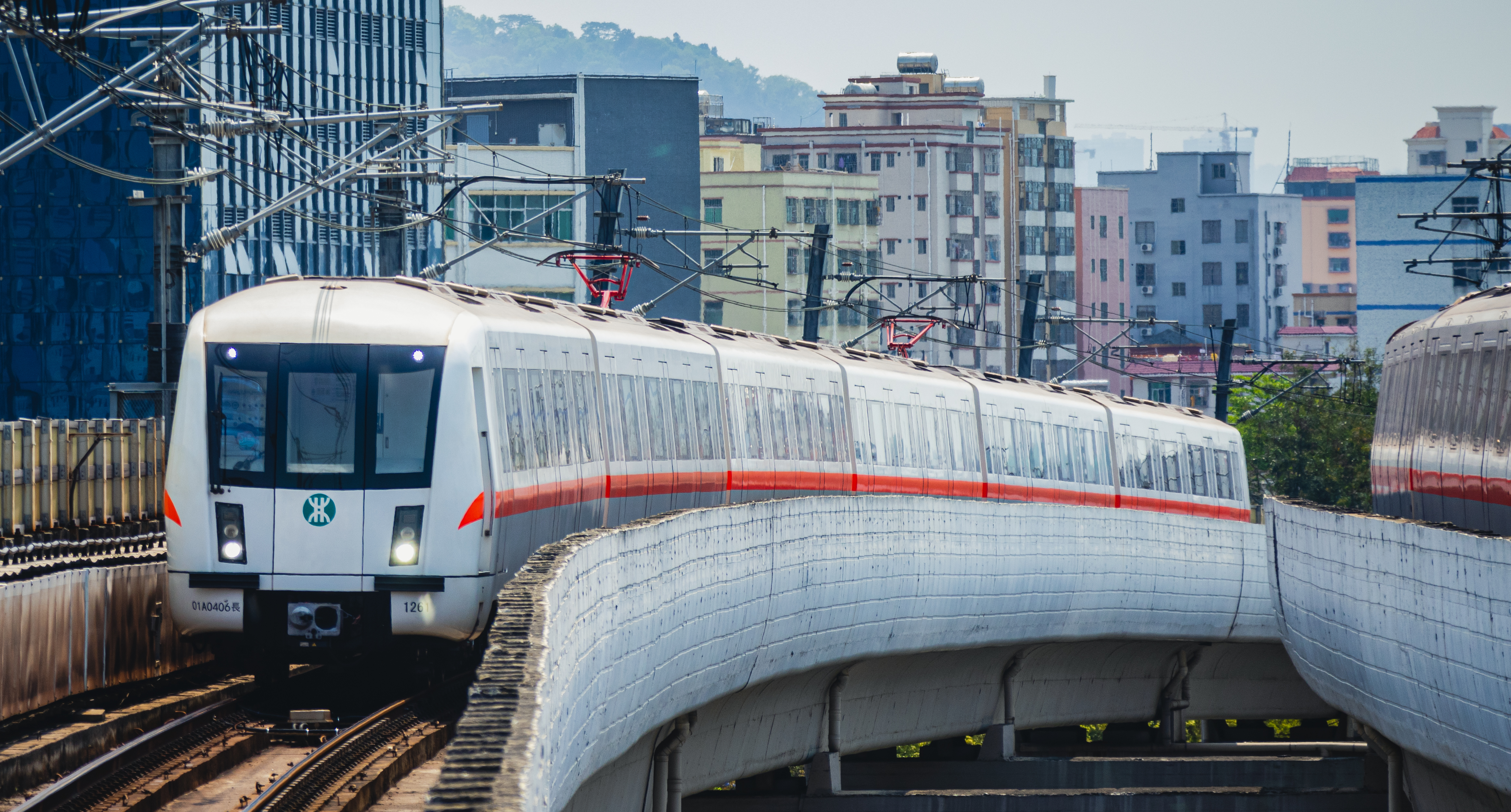
Changchun Railway Vehicles train

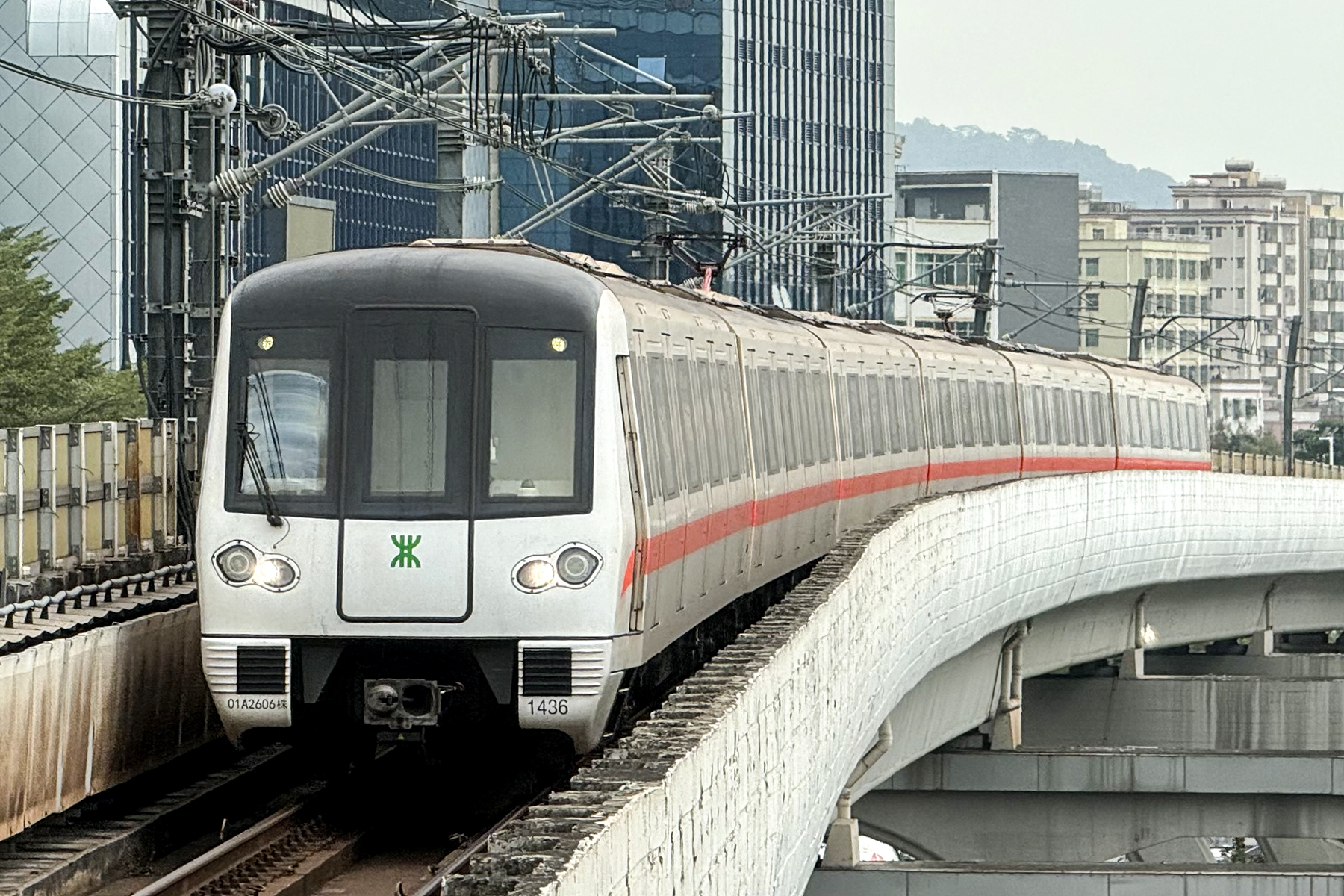
Zhuzhou Electric Locomotive Works train

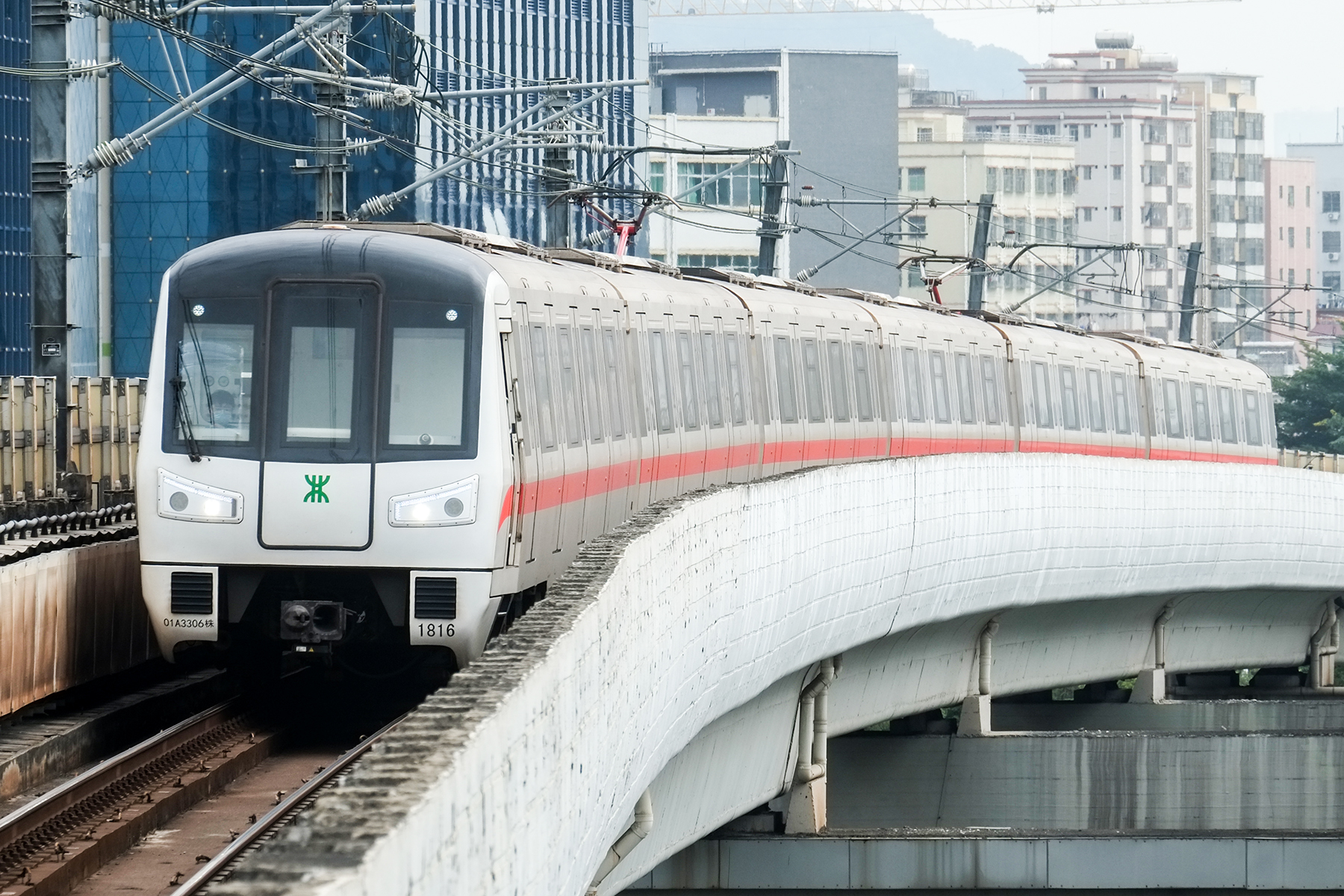
Zhuzhou Electric Locomotive Works train
