= Airport East station =

Shenzhen Metro Line 1 and Line 12 station

Airport East 机场东
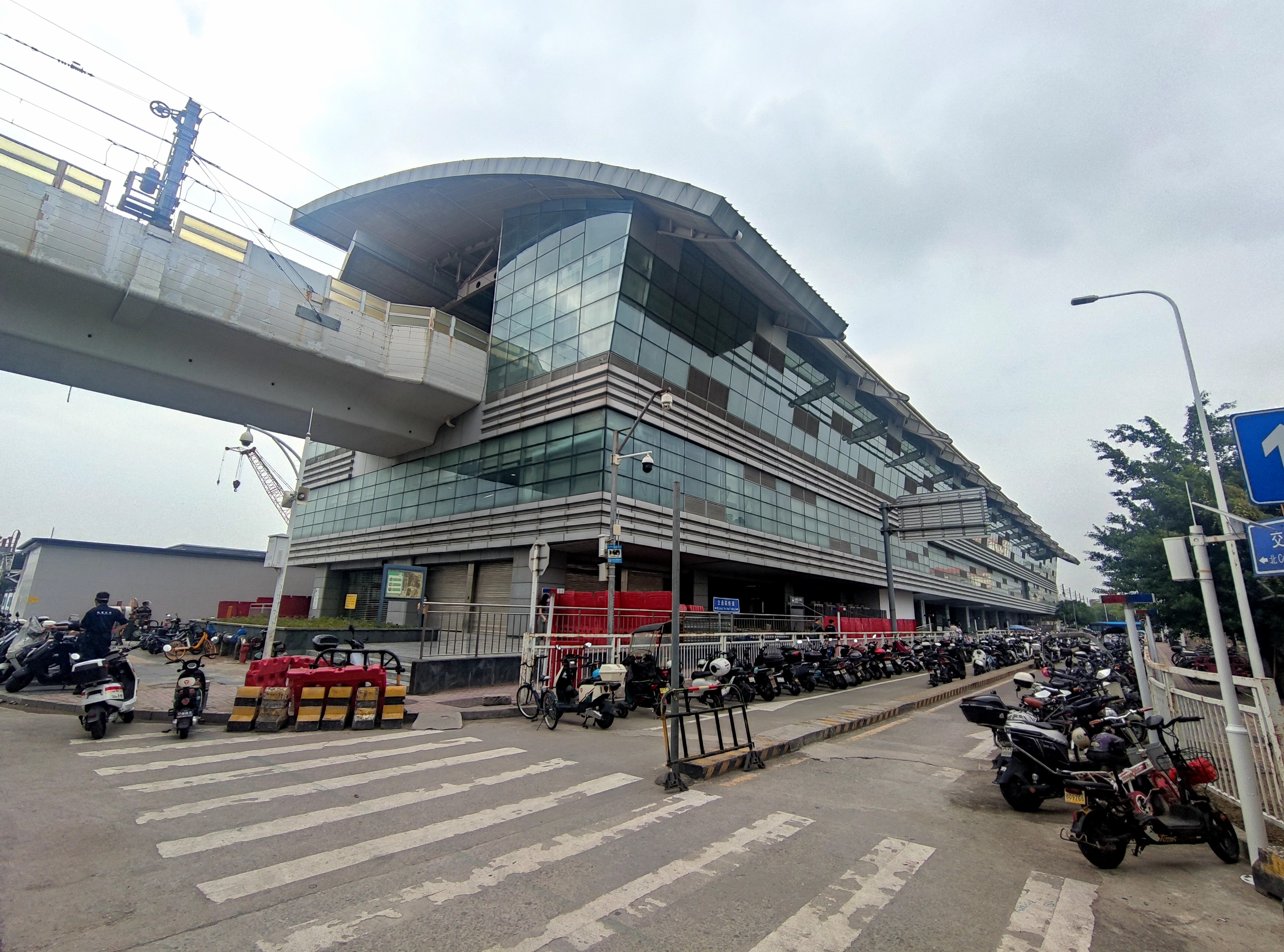
- Line 1 station exterior (January 2022)

Chinese name
- Traditional Chinese: 機場東
- Simplified Chinese: 机场东
Transcriptions
Standard Mandarin
- Hanyu Pinyin: Jīchàng Dōng
Yue: Cantonese
- Yale Romanization: Gēichèuhng Dūng
- Jyutping: Gei1coeng4 Dung1

General information
- Location: In the Green area between Hangzhan 4th Road and Bao'an Avenue; Fuyong Subdistrict, Bao'an District, Shenzhen, Guangdong; People's Republic of China
- Coordinates: 22°39′00″N 113°49′03″E
- Operator: SZMC (Shenzhen Metro Group); Shenzhen Line 12 Rail Transit Co., Ltd (Shenzhen Metro Group and PowerChina PPP)
- Lines: Line 1; Line 12
- Platforms: 4 (2 side platforms and 1 island platform)
- Tracks: 4

Construction
- Structure type: Elevated (Line 1); Underground (Line 12)
- Accessible: Yes

Other information
- Station code: 101 (Line 1); 1215 (Line 12)

History
- Opened: Line 1: 15 June 2011 (15 years ago); Line 12: 28 November 2022 (3 years ago)

Services
Preceding station	Shenzhen Metro	Following station
Terminus	Line 1	Hourui towards Luohu
Fuwei towards Songgang	Line 12	Xingwei towards Zuopaotai East
Track layout
Location

Airport East station (simplified Chinese: 机场东站; traditional Chinese: 機場東站; pinyin: Jīchàng Dōng Zhàn; Jyutping: Gei1 Coeng4 Dung1 Zaam6; Cantonese Yale: Gēichèuhng Dūng Jaahm) is an interchange station for Line 1 and Line 12 of Shenzhen Metro in Shenzhen, Guangdong Province, China. Line 1 platforms opened on 15 June 2011 and Line 12 platforms opened on 28 November 2022.

== History ==
Since Terminals A and B at Shenzhen Bao'an International Airport have closed and been replaced by Terminal 3 in November 2013, this metro station no longer serves the airport. Bus number M417, which used to connect this station to the airport, has been suspended and replaced with limited service by bus M5. Passengers for the airport should alight at the Airport station on Line 11 to reach the new terminal.

== Station layout ==
3F; 1 Platforms	Side platform, doors will open on the right
3F; 1 Platforms	Platform	1 termination platform
3F; 1 Platforms	Platform	1 towards Luohu (Hourui)
3F; 1 Platforms	Side platform, doors will open on the right
2F; Concourse	Lobby of Line 1
G Concourse	Lobby of Line 1	Exit, Ticket Machines, Customer Service
B1F; Concourse	Lobby of Line 12	Ticket machines, Customer Service
B2F; 12 Platforms	Platform	12 towards Songgang (Fuwei)
B2F; 12 Platforms	Island platform, doors will open on the left
B2F; 12 Platforms	Platform	12 towards Zuopaotai East (Xingwei)

=== Entrances/exits ===
The Line 1 station has 2 points of entry/exit, of which 2 other ones (original Exits C and D) were demolished for Line 12 construction. The Line 12 station has 2 points of entry/exit, with Exit D being accessible via elevator. Both are temporary, and will be demolished when the transportation hub is completed.

Exit	Destination
Exit A	Jichang 6th Road (N), Hangzhan 4th Road (E)
Exit B	Taxi, Shuttle Bus to Terminal 3, Bao'an Boulevard
Exit C	Hangzhan 4th Road (N)
Exit D	Hangzhan 4th Road (S), Jichang 6th Road (S)

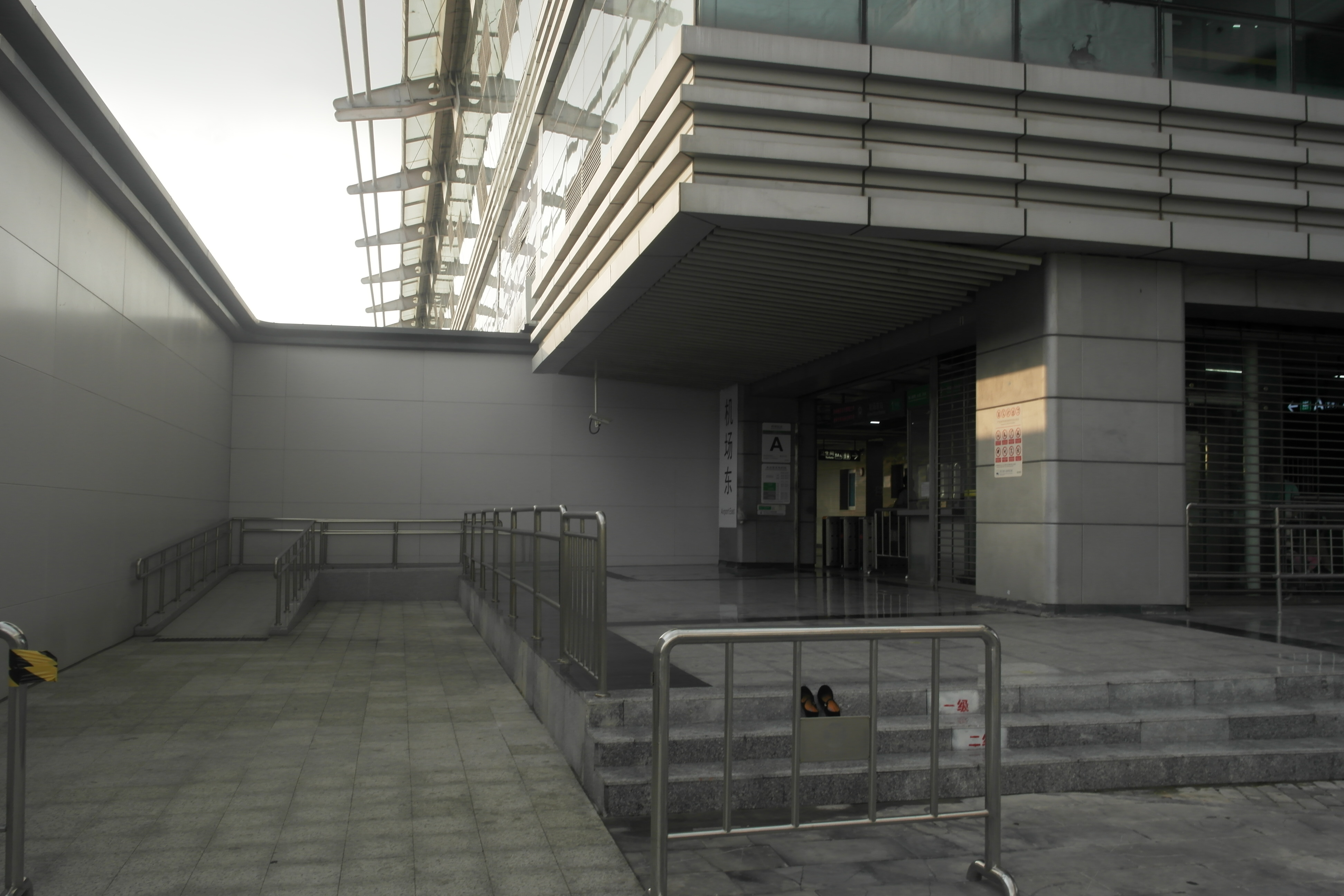
Entrance A

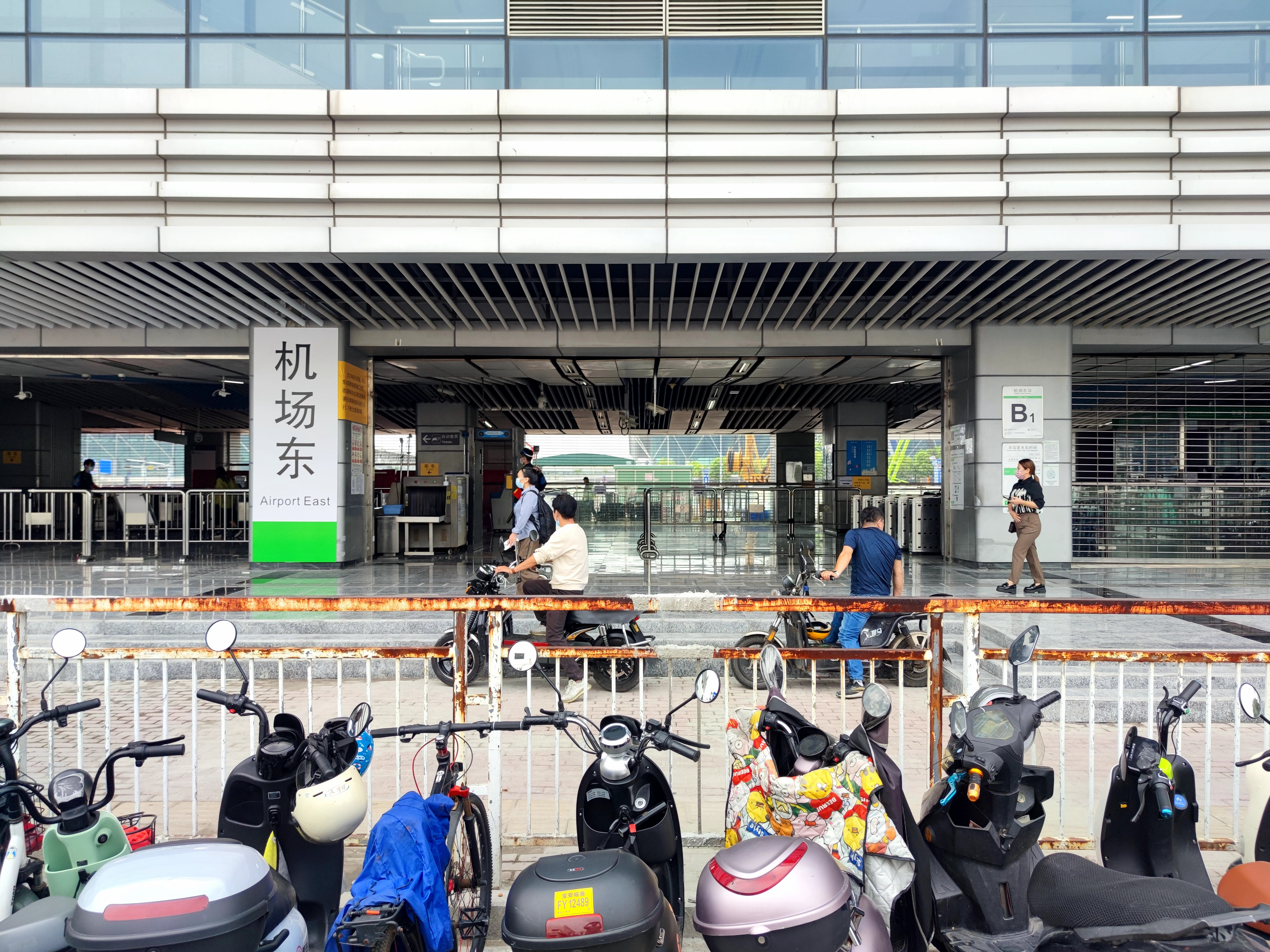
Entrance B

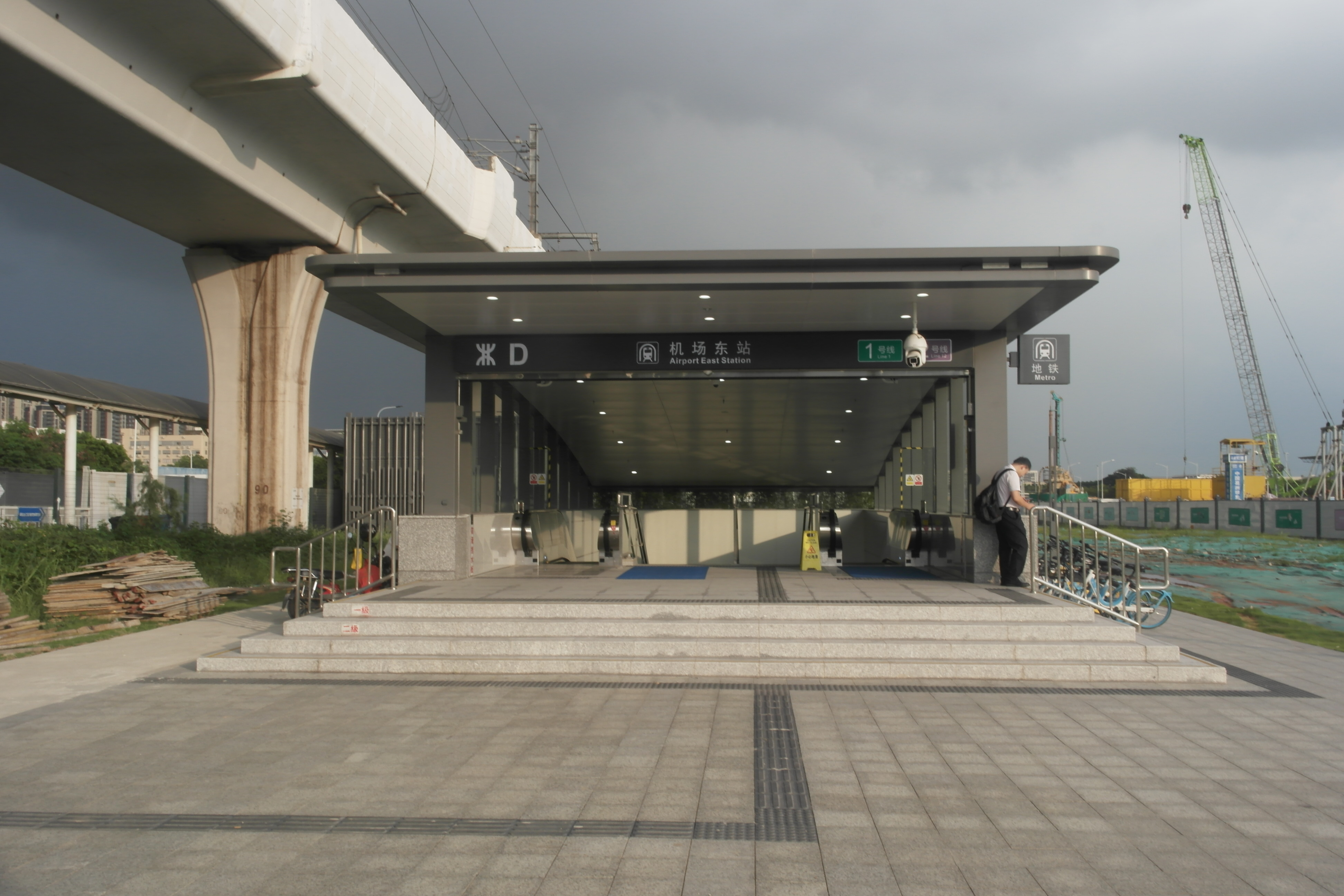
Entrance D

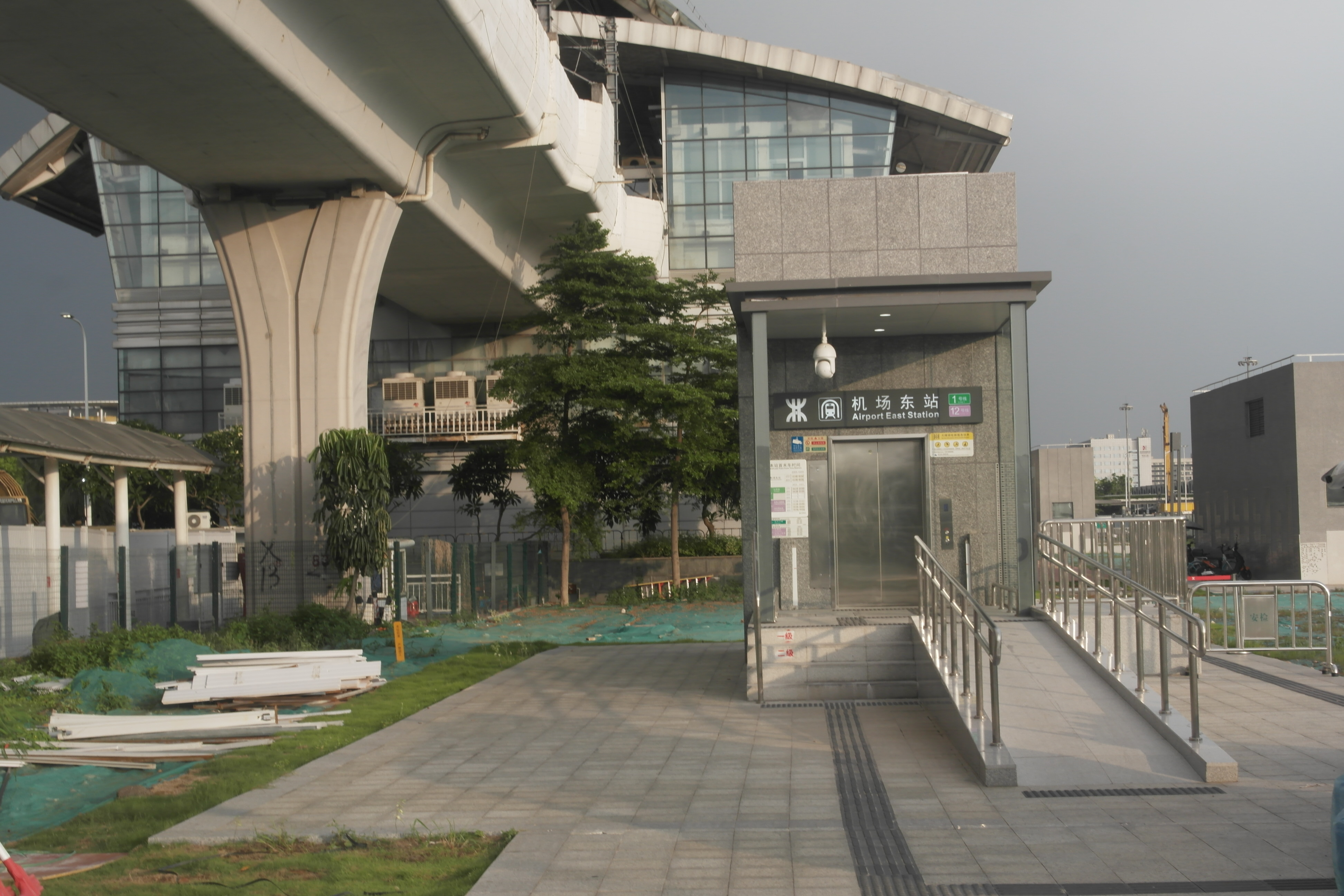
Entrance D (elevator entrance)

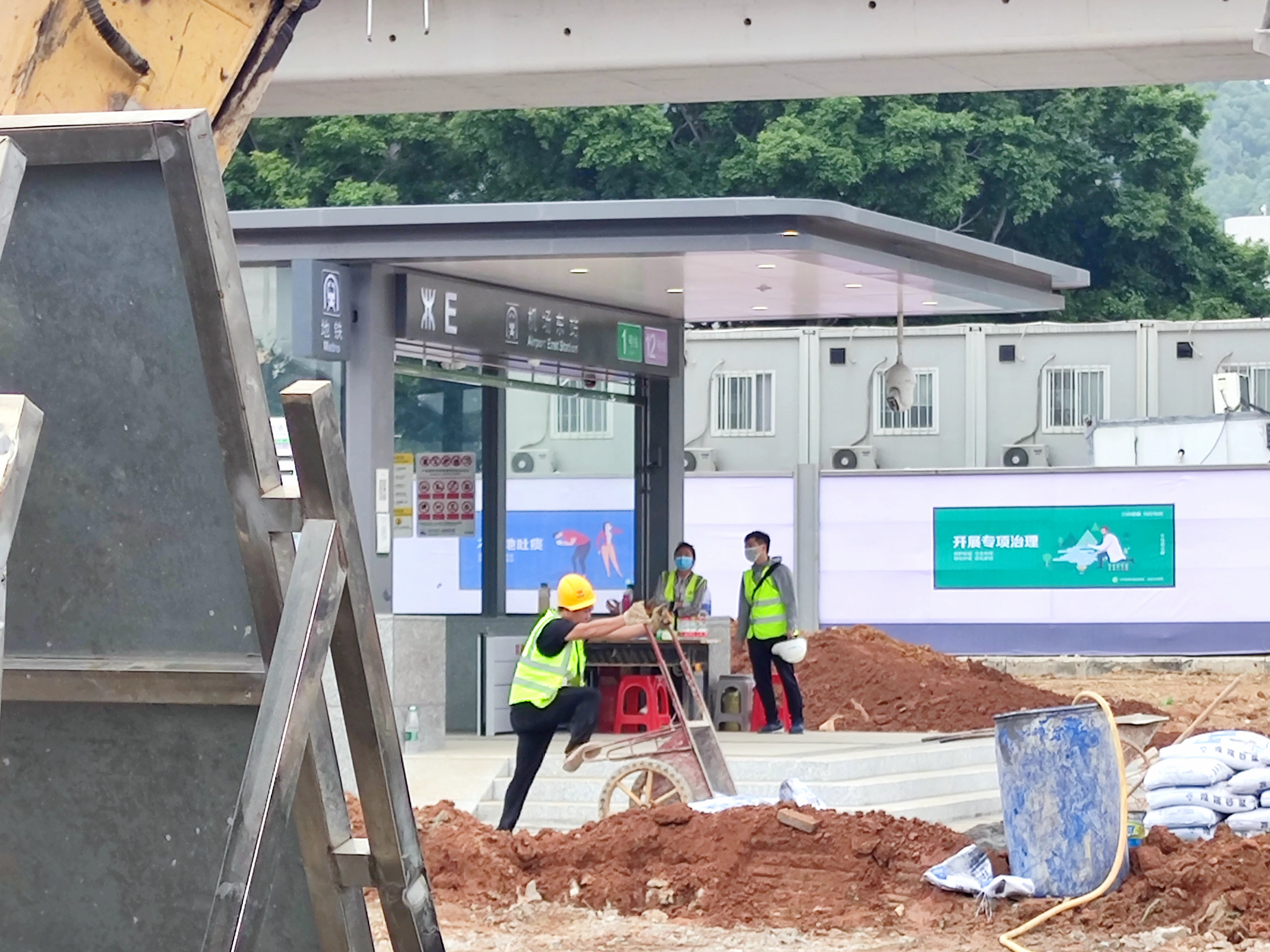
Entrance E

== Gallery ==
=== Line 1 ===
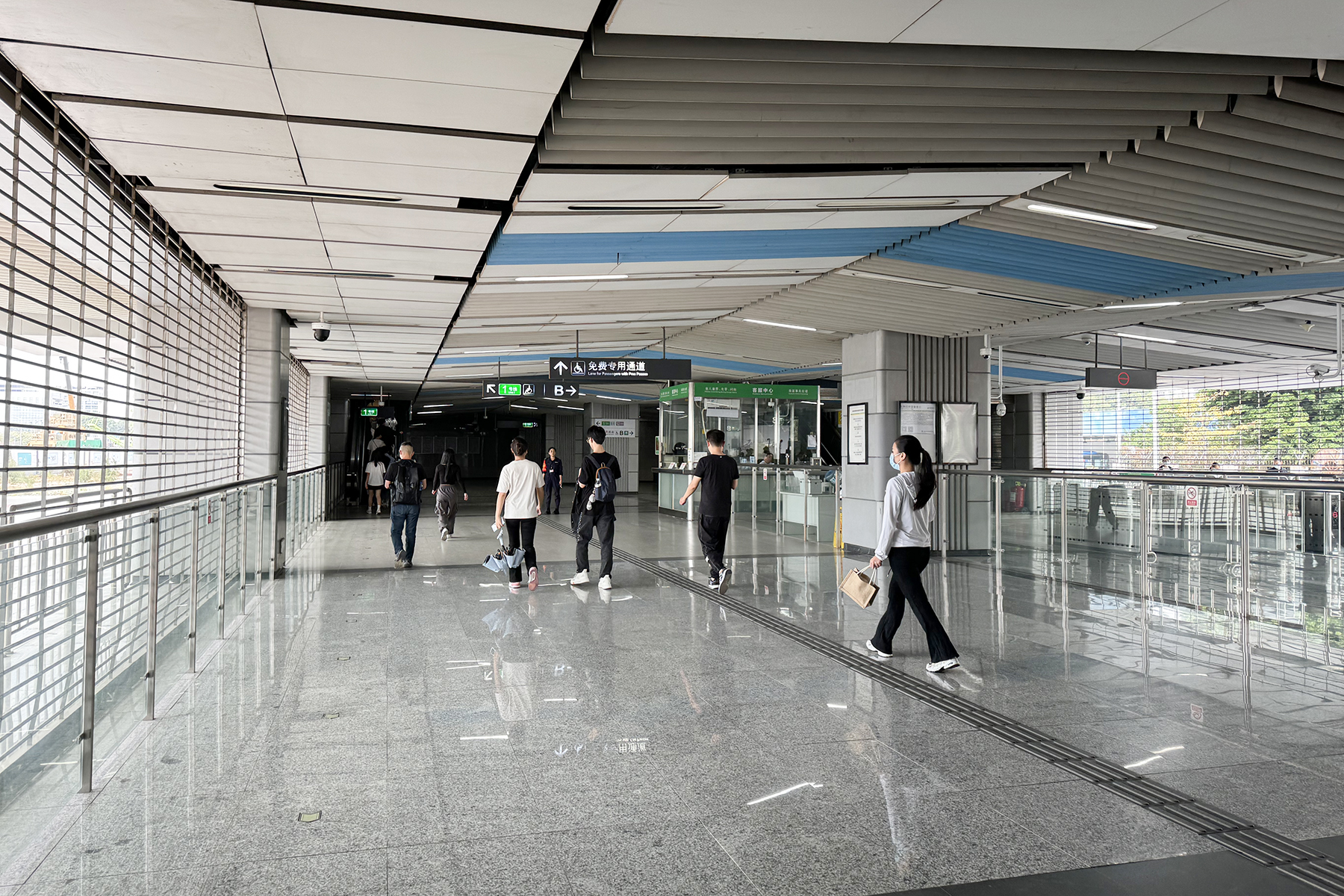
Line 1 concourse

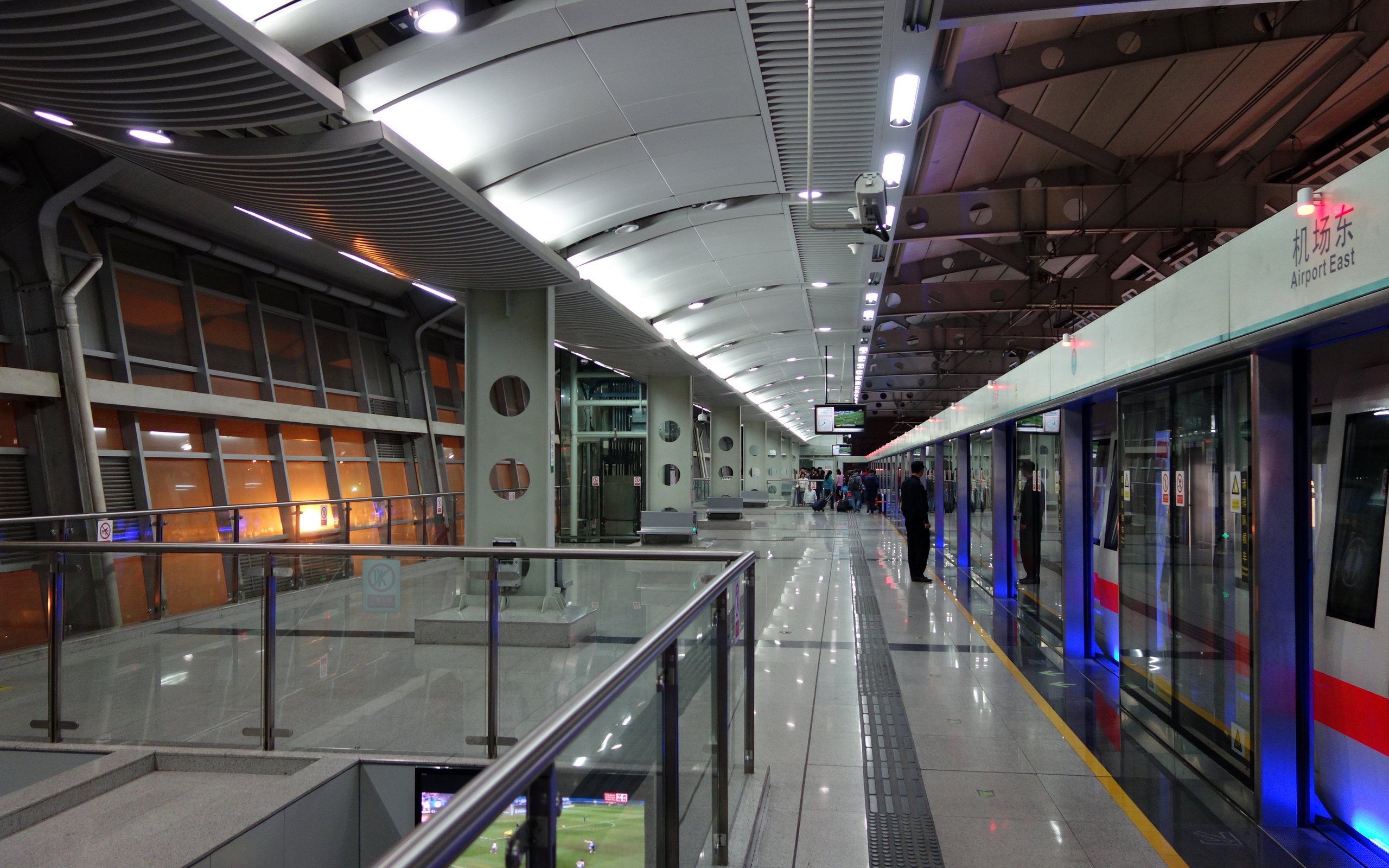
Line 1 termination platform (March 2013)

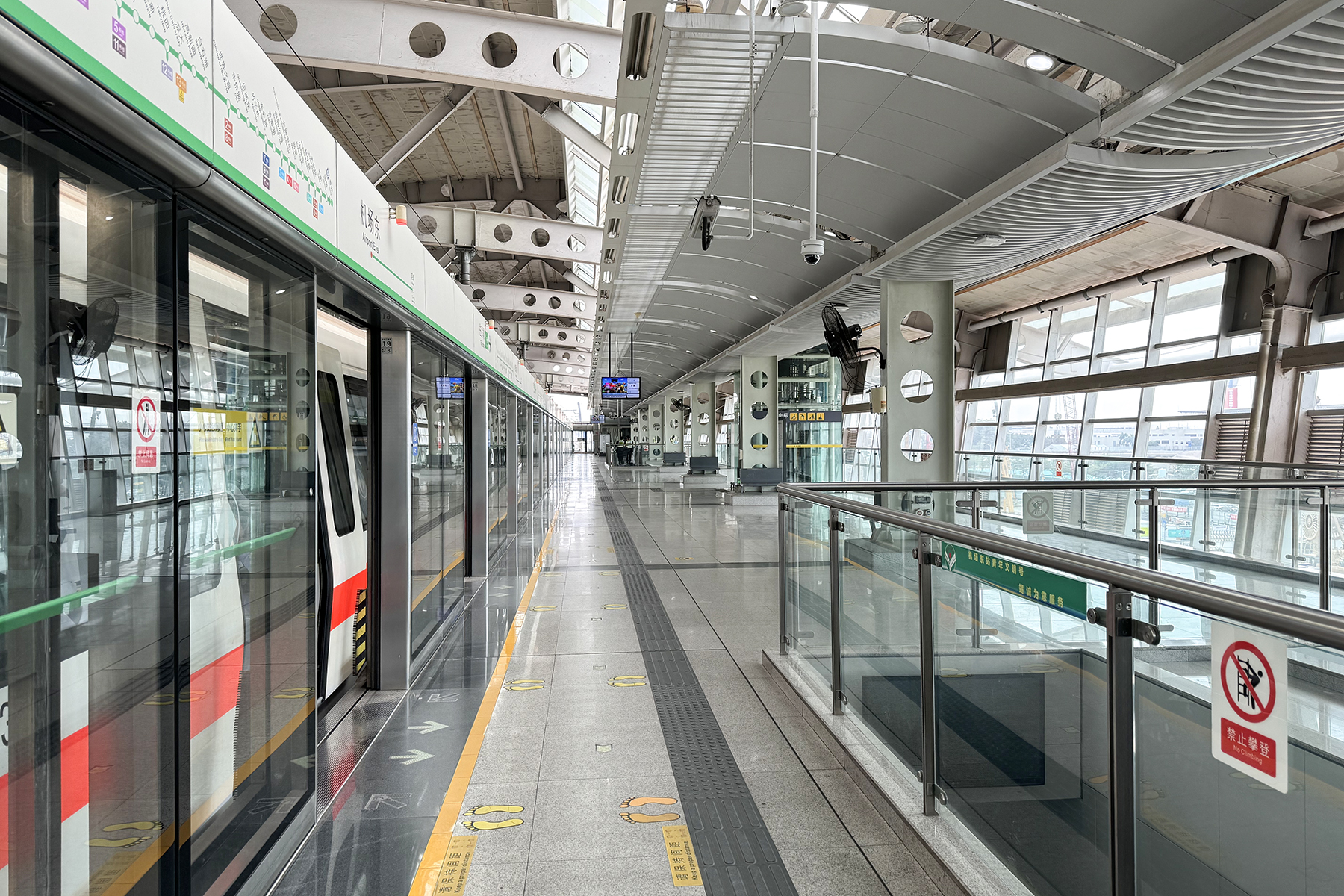
Line 1 originating platform (December 2023)

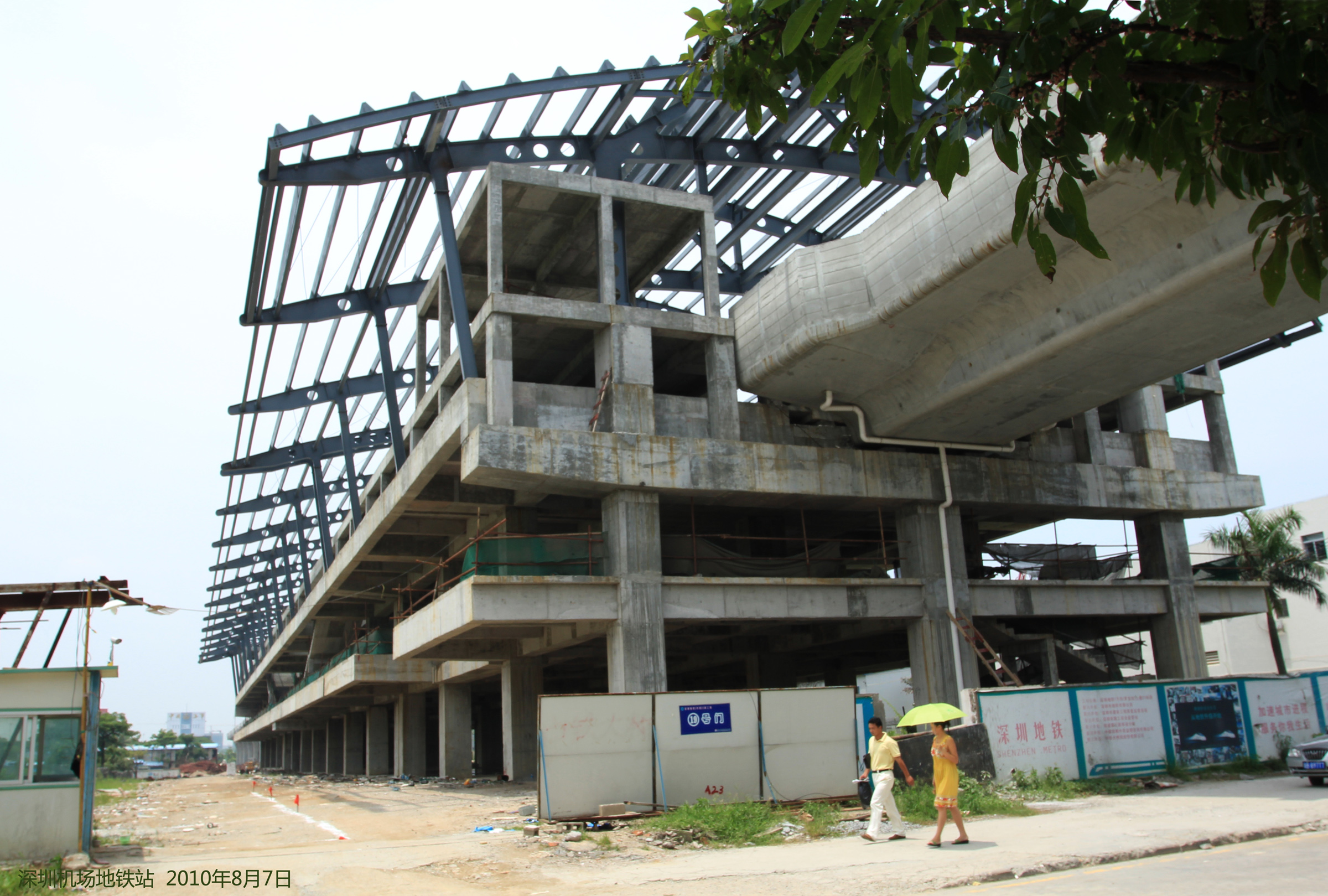
Line 1 construction site in 2010

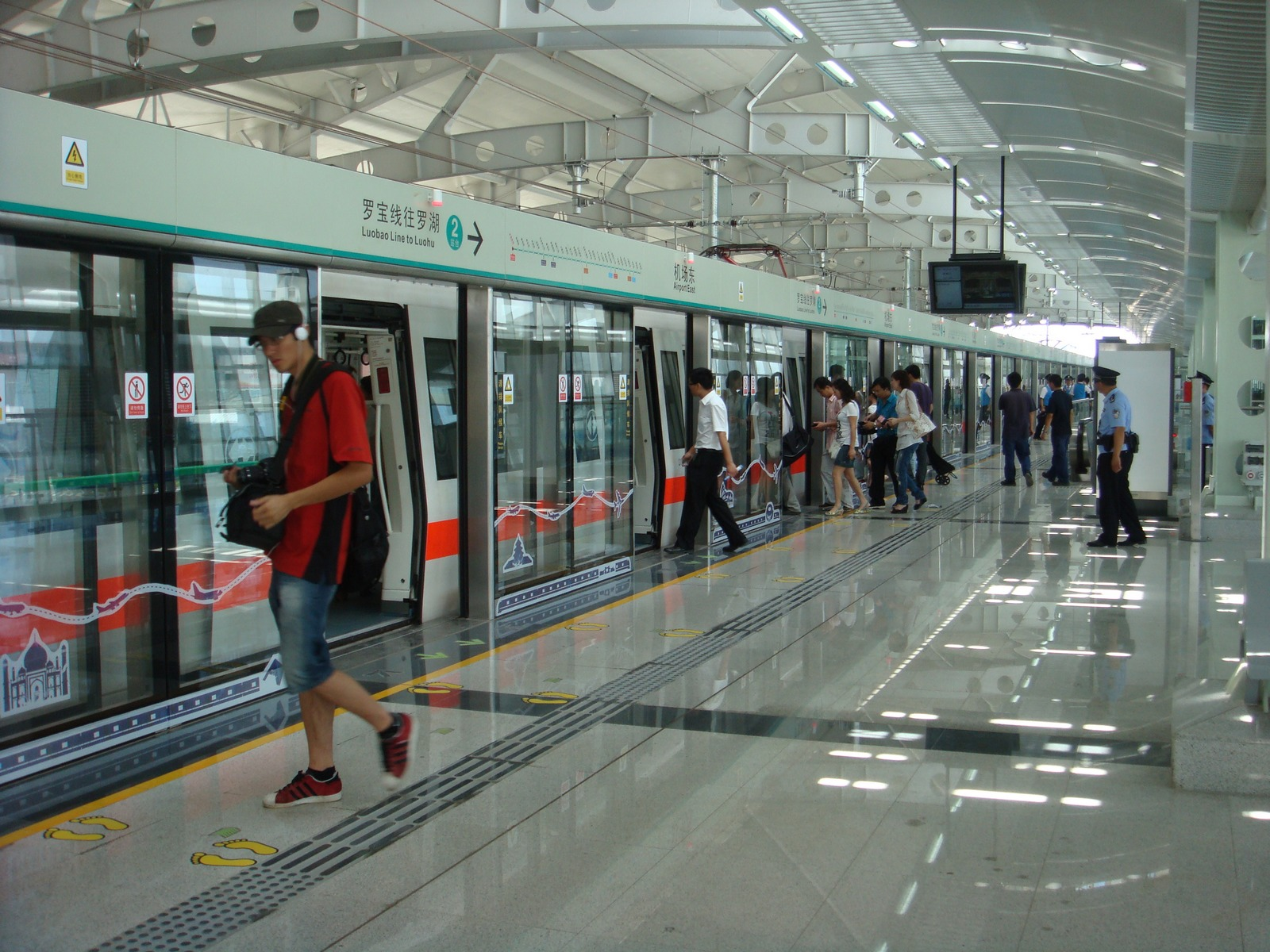
Platform 2 in 2011

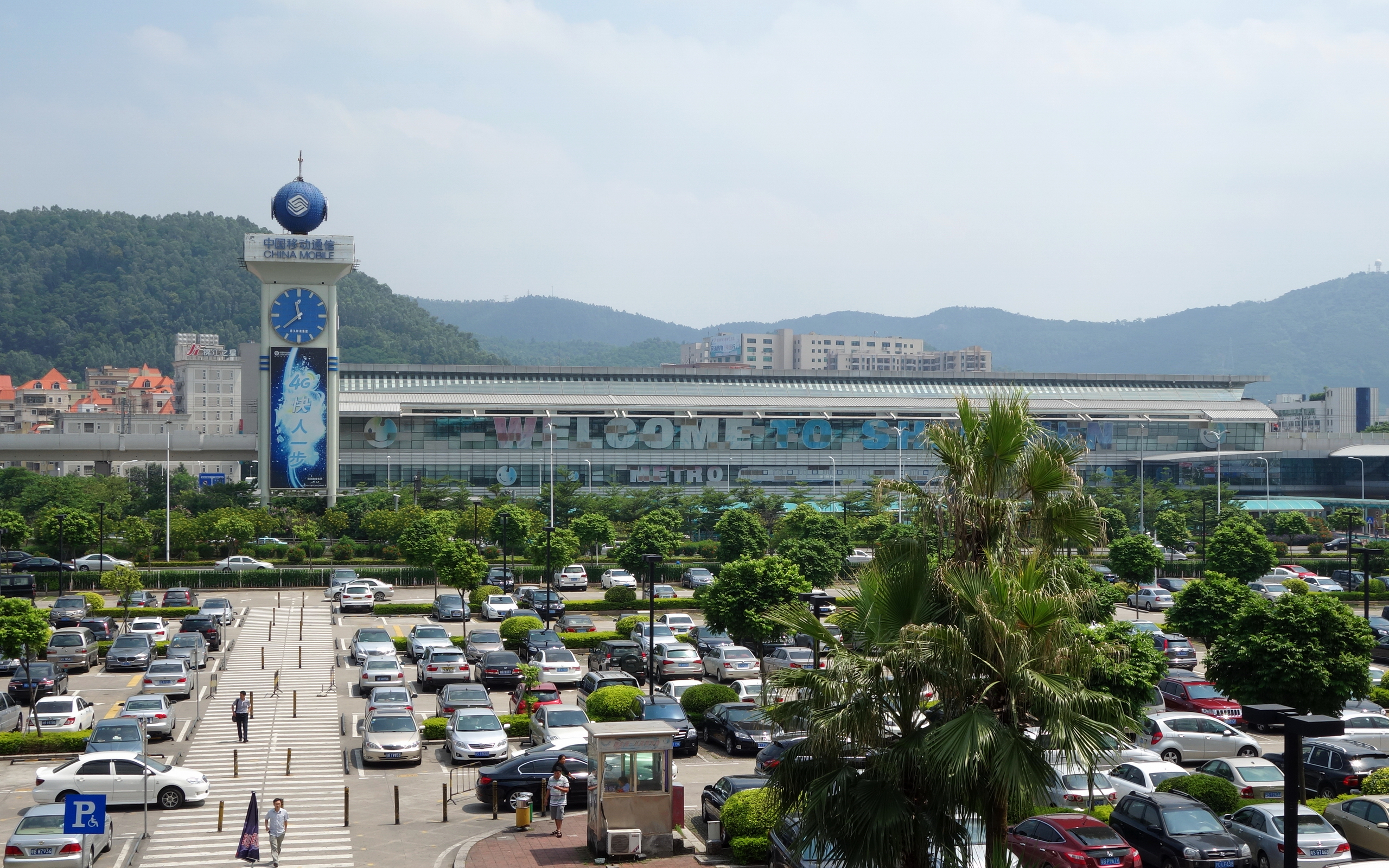
Line 1 station exterior in 2013

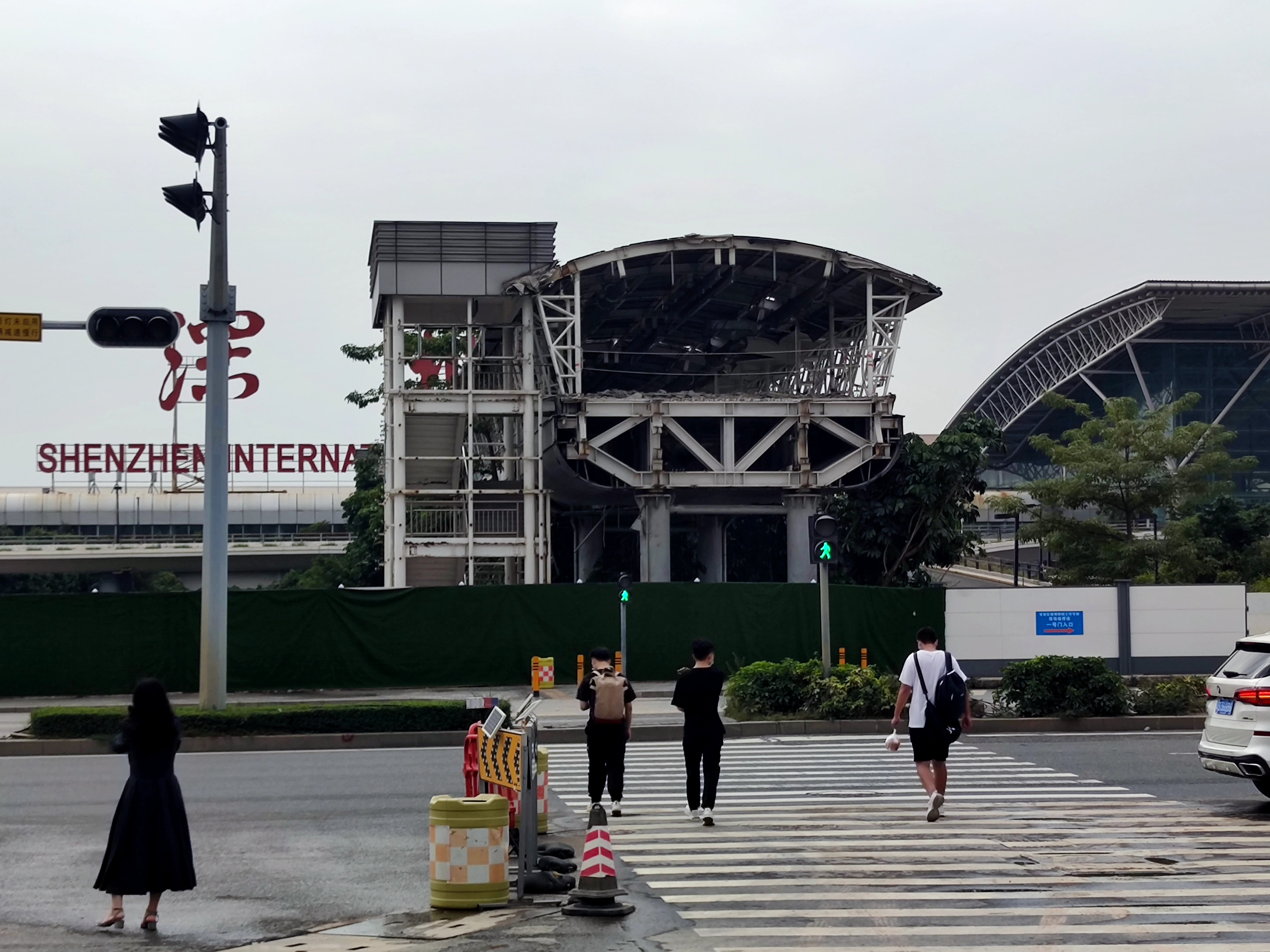
Connecting passage in 2022 (demolished in 2021)

=== Line 12 ===
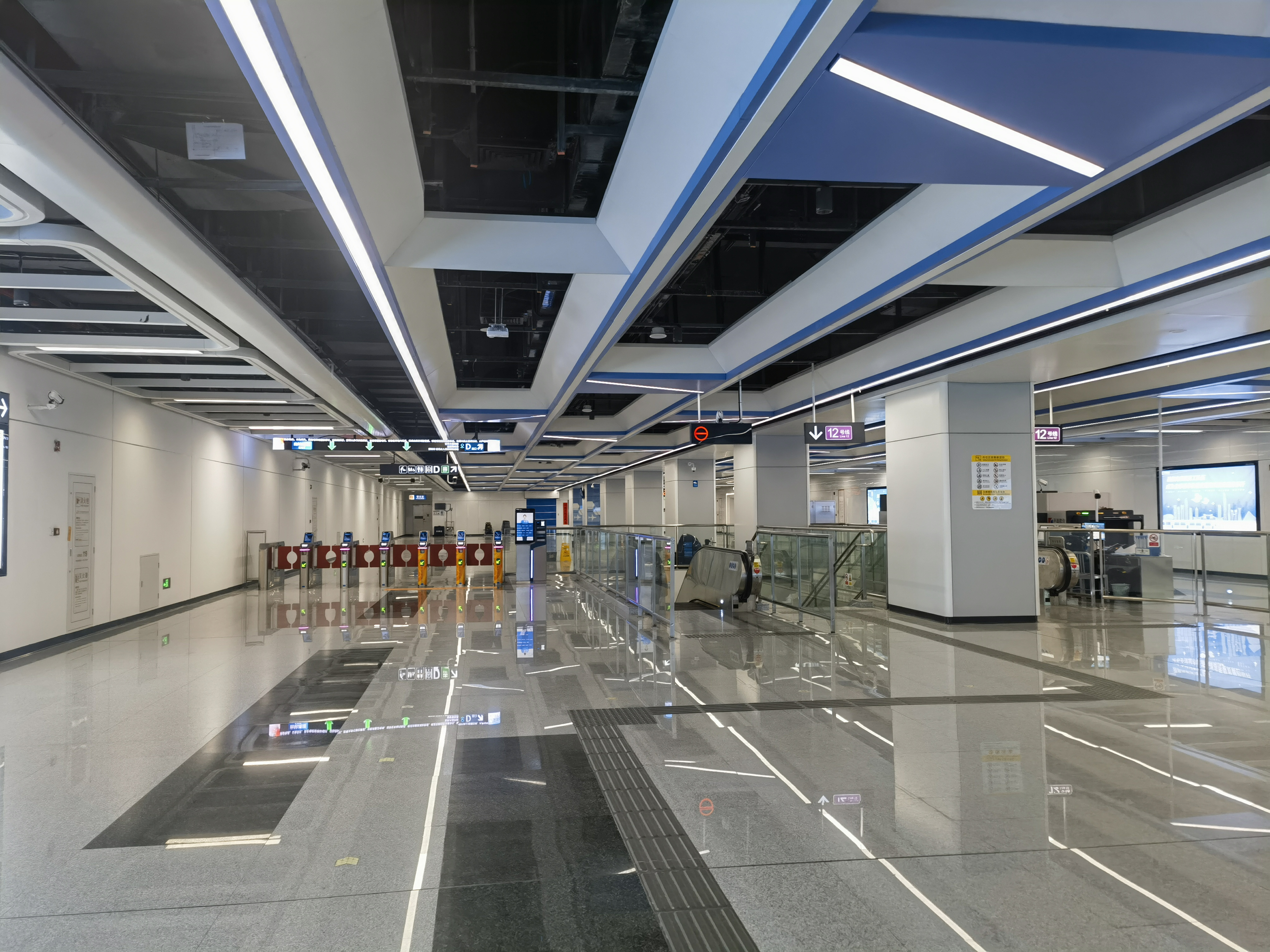
Line 12 concourse

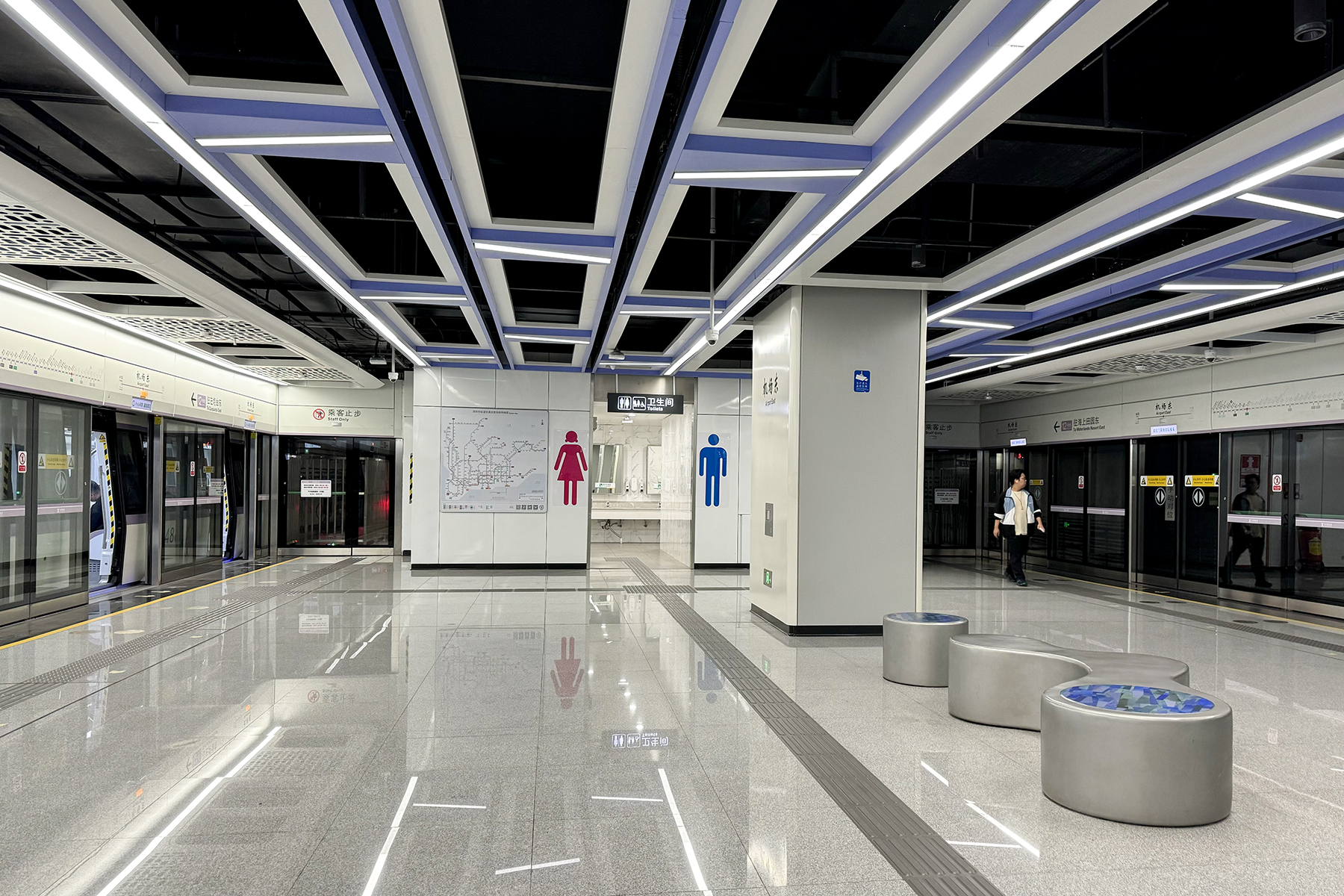
Line 12 platform

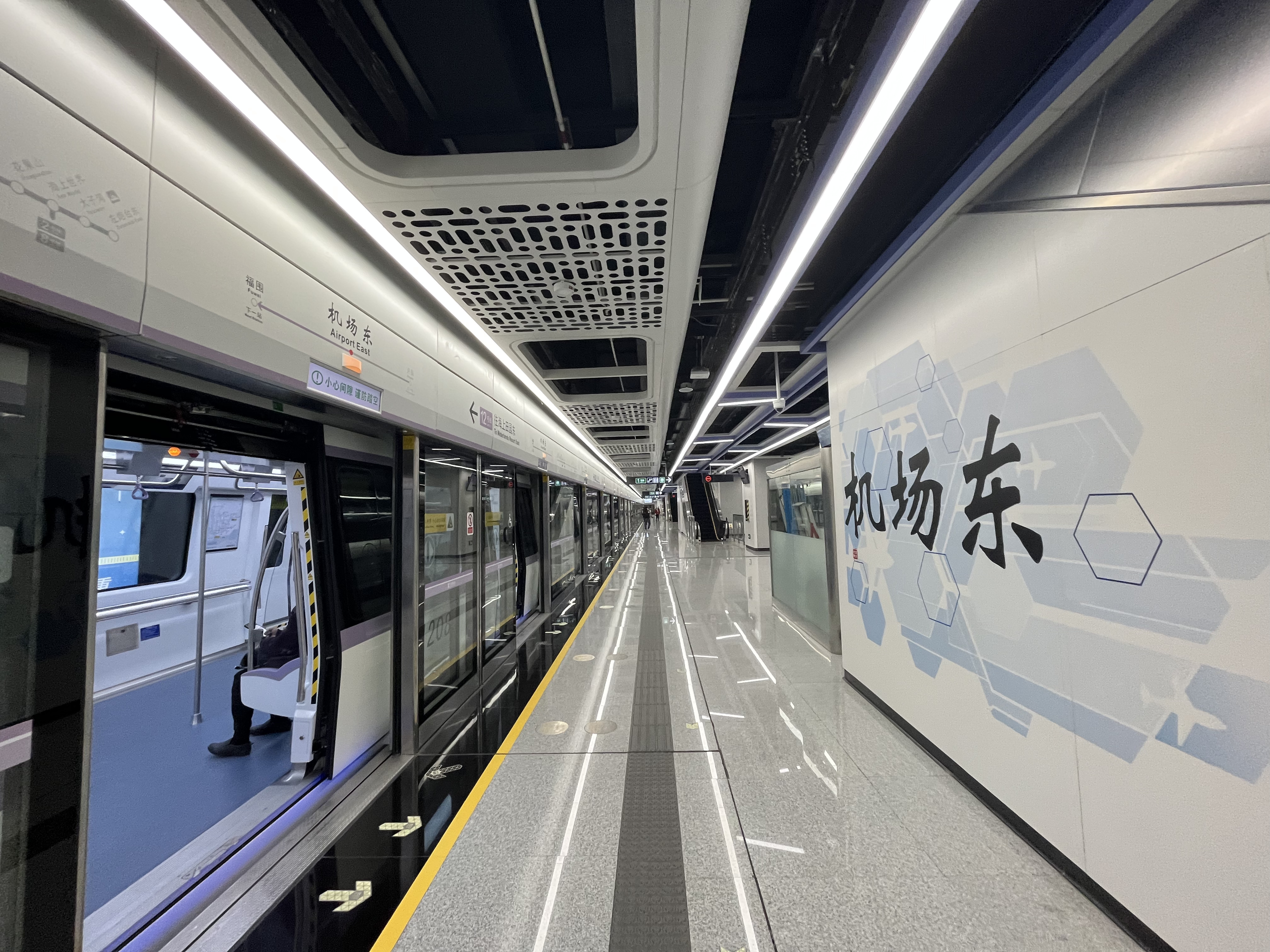
Platform calligraphy
