= Luohu station =

Metro station in Shenzhen, Guangdong, China

Coordinates: 22°31′52″N 114°7′6″E

Luohu 罗湖
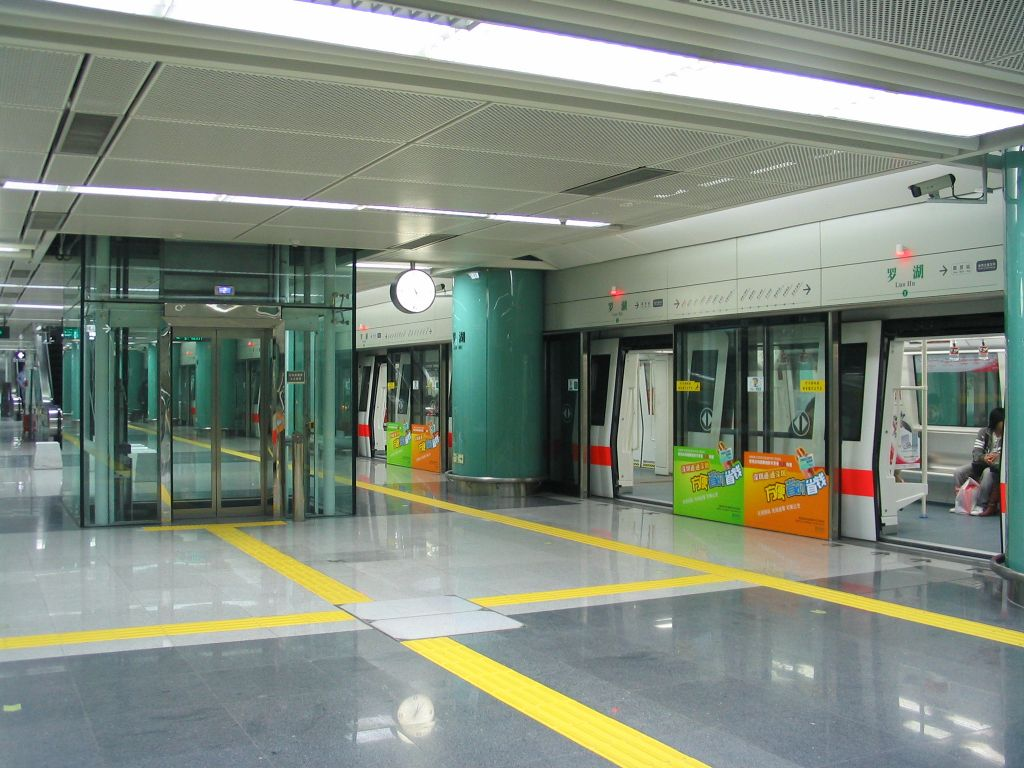

Chinese name
- Traditional Chinese: 羅湖
- Simplified Chinese: 罗湖
Transcriptions
Standard Mandarin
- Hanyu Pinyin: Luóhú
Yue: Cantonese
- Yale Romanization: Lòwù
- IPA: [lɔ˩wu˩]
- Jyutping: lo4wu4

General information
- Location: Luohu District, Shenzhen, Guangdong; China
- Operator: SZMC (Shenzhen Metro Group)
- Line: Line 1
- Platforms: 5 (Spanish Solution, 2 island platforms and 1 side platform)
- Tracks: 3
- Train operators: SZMC (Shenzhen Metro Group)
- Connections: Line 9 (Renmin South); East Rail line (Lo Wu); Shenzhen (Luohu)

Construction
- Structure type: Underground
- Accessible: Yes

Other information
- Station code: 130

History
- Opened: 28 December 2004; 21 years ago

Passengers
- 66,837 daily (2015) (Ranked 3rd of 118)

Services
Preceding station	Shenzhen Metro	Following station
Guomao towards Airport East	Line 1	Terminus
Out-of-station interchange
Xiangxicun towards Wenjin	Line 9 transfer at Renmin South	Ludancun towards Qianwan
Across mainland China–Hong Kong boundary
Preceding station	MTR	Following station
Sheung Shui towards Admiralty	East Rail line transfer at Lo Wu	Terminus
Track layout
Location

Luohu station (simplified Chinese: 罗湖站; traditional Chinese: 羅湖站; pinyin: Luóhú Zhàn; Cantonese Jyutping: Lo4 Wu4 Zaam6) is an underground terminus of Line 1 of the Shenzhen Metro in Shenzhen, Guangdong Province, China. It is located beneath the East Plaza of Shenzhen railway station in Shenzhen's Luohu District. It is the second-busiest station in the network in terms of system entries and exits, with approximately 56,400 passengers a day.

Opened on 28 December 2004, Luohu station offers interchange to the Guangzhou–Shenzhen railway at Shenzhen railway station, and to the Hong Kong MTR at Lo Wu station. Two tracks run through the station, with platforms on either side; passengers board from the central island platform and alight on the side platforms. This configuration is known as the Spanish solution.

== Station layout ==
G	–	Exits
B1F; Concourse	Lobby	Customer service, shops, ticket vending Machines, ATMs, full body scanners
B2F; Platforms	Side platform, doors will open on the left for alighting passengers only
B2F; Platforms	Platform 1 ↑ Platform 2 ↓	← Line 1 towards Airport East (Guomao)
B2F; Platforms	Island platform, doors will open on the left/right for boarding passengers only
B2F; Platforms	Platform 3 ↑ Platform 4 ↓	← Line 1 towards Airport East (Guomao)
B2F; Platforms	Island platform, doors will open on the right for alighting passengers only
B2F; Platforms	Platform 5	Line 1 termination platform→

== Exits ==
Exit		Destination
Exit A	A1	Luohu Commercial City, Luohu Long-distance Bus Station
Exit A	A2	Shenzhen–Hong Kong Integrated Commercial Street, Luohu Port (transfer to MTR East Rail Line at Lo Wu Station after crossing the border)
Exit A	A3	Luohu Commercial City, Luohu Long-distance Bus Station, Qiaoshe Intercity Bus Station
Exit B		Renmin South Road, Yanhe South Road, Luohucun, Bus Station, Taxi Stands, Left Luggage
Exit C		Shenzhen railway station West Square, Jianshe Road, Heping Road, Century Plaza Hotel, Shenzhen Customs of the People's Republic of China (China Customs), Customs House
Exit D		Shenzhen railway station West Square, Tickets/Waiting room
Exit E	E1	Shenzhen railway station Sunken Square
Exit E	E2	Renmin South Road, Jianshe Road, Hangcheng Arts Plaza, Renmin South station Exit B

== See also ==
- Guangzhou–Shenzhen railway
- Shenzhen railway station (China Railway including CRH)
- Lo Wu station (Hong Kong MTR)
