= Shaibu station =

Metro station in Shenzhen, China

Shaibu 晒布
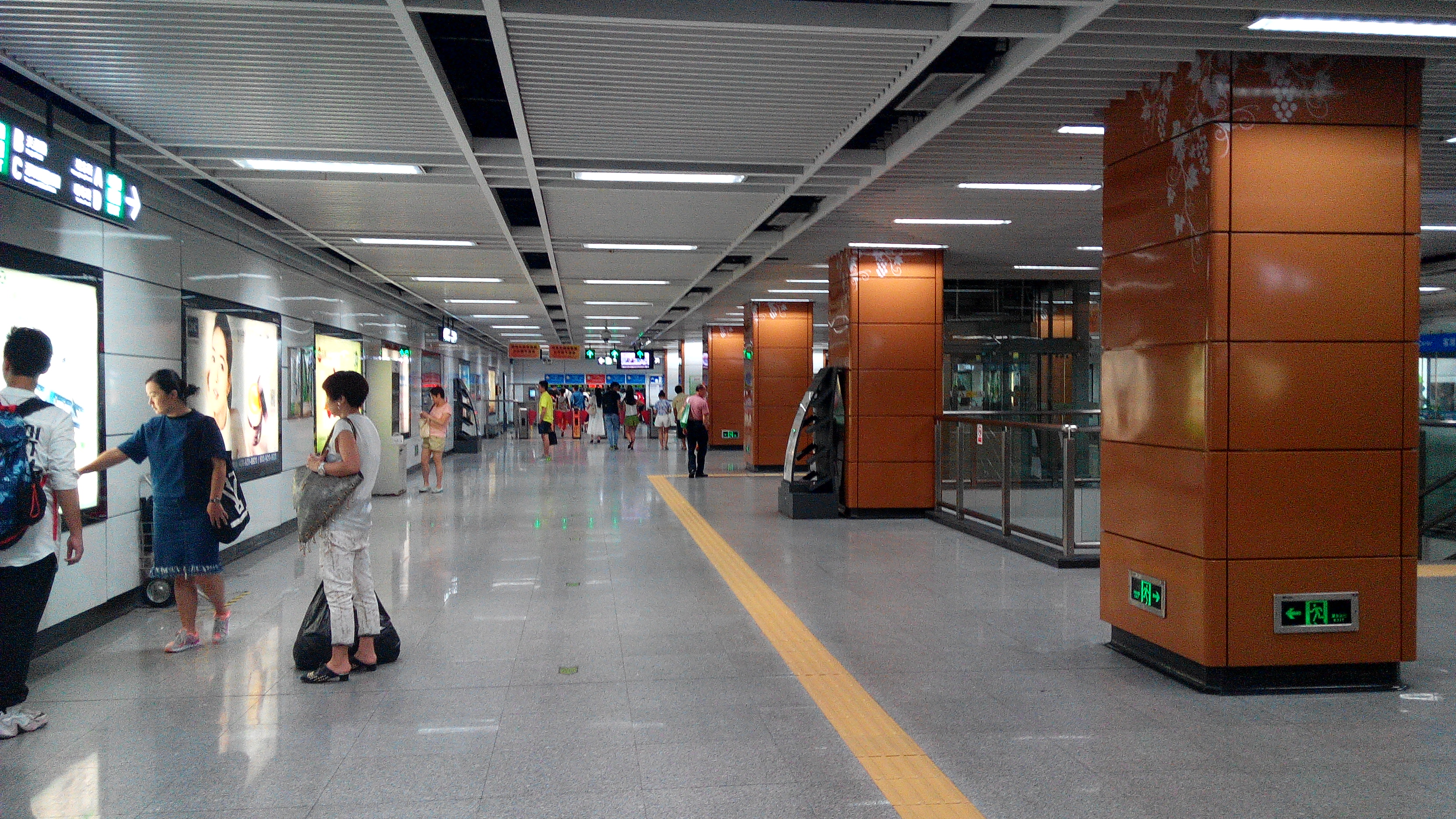
- Platform

General information
- Location: Luohu District, Shenzhen, Guangdong; China
- Coordinates: 22°32′58″N 114°7′22″E
- Operator: Shenzhen Metro Line 3 Operations
- Line: Line 3
- Platforms: 2 (1 island platform)
- Tracks: 2

Construction
- Structure type: Underground
- Accessible: Yes

History
- Opened: 28 June 2011 (15 years ago)

Services
Preceding station	Shenzhen Metro	Following station
Cuizhu towards Pingdi Liulian	Line 3	Laojie towards Futian Bonded Area
Location

Shaibu station (Chinese: 晒布站; pinyin: Shàibù Zhàn) is a station on Line 3 of the Shenzhen Metro. It opened on 28 June 2011. It is located at the intersection of Shaibu and Middle Dongmen Roads.

This station is located close to Dongmen, which can be accessed via this station or Laojie Station. Shenzhen Middle School is also located near to this station.

== Station layout ==
G	-	Exits A, B, D
B1F; Concourse	Lobby	Ticket Machines, Customer Service, Shops, Vending Machines
B2F; Platforms	Platform	3 towards Futian Bonded Area (Laojie)
B2F; Platforms	Island platform, doors will open on the left
B2F; Platforms	Platform	3 towards Pingdi Liulian (Cuizhu)

== Exits ==
Exit		Destination
Exit A	A1	Dongmen Middle Road (S), Chengdong Street, Erhao Road, Metropark Hotel (Metropark Commercial Center)
Exit A	A2	Metropark Hotel (Metropark Commercial Center)
Exit A	A3	Dongmen Middle Road (S), Metropark Hotel (Metropark Commercial Center)
Exit B		Dongmen Middle Road (N), Xinghu Road, Zhongxing Road
Exit D	D1	Dongmen Middle Road (S), Shaibu Road, Shenzhen Middle School, People's Park
