= Guomao station =

Guomao station may refer to:

- Guomao station (Beijing Subway), a station on Line 1 and Line 10 of the Beijing Subway
- Guomao station (Shenzhen Metro), a station on Line 1 of the Shenzhen Metro
