= Dongmen station (Shenzhen Metro) =

Metro station in Shenzhen, Guangdong, China

Dongmen 东门
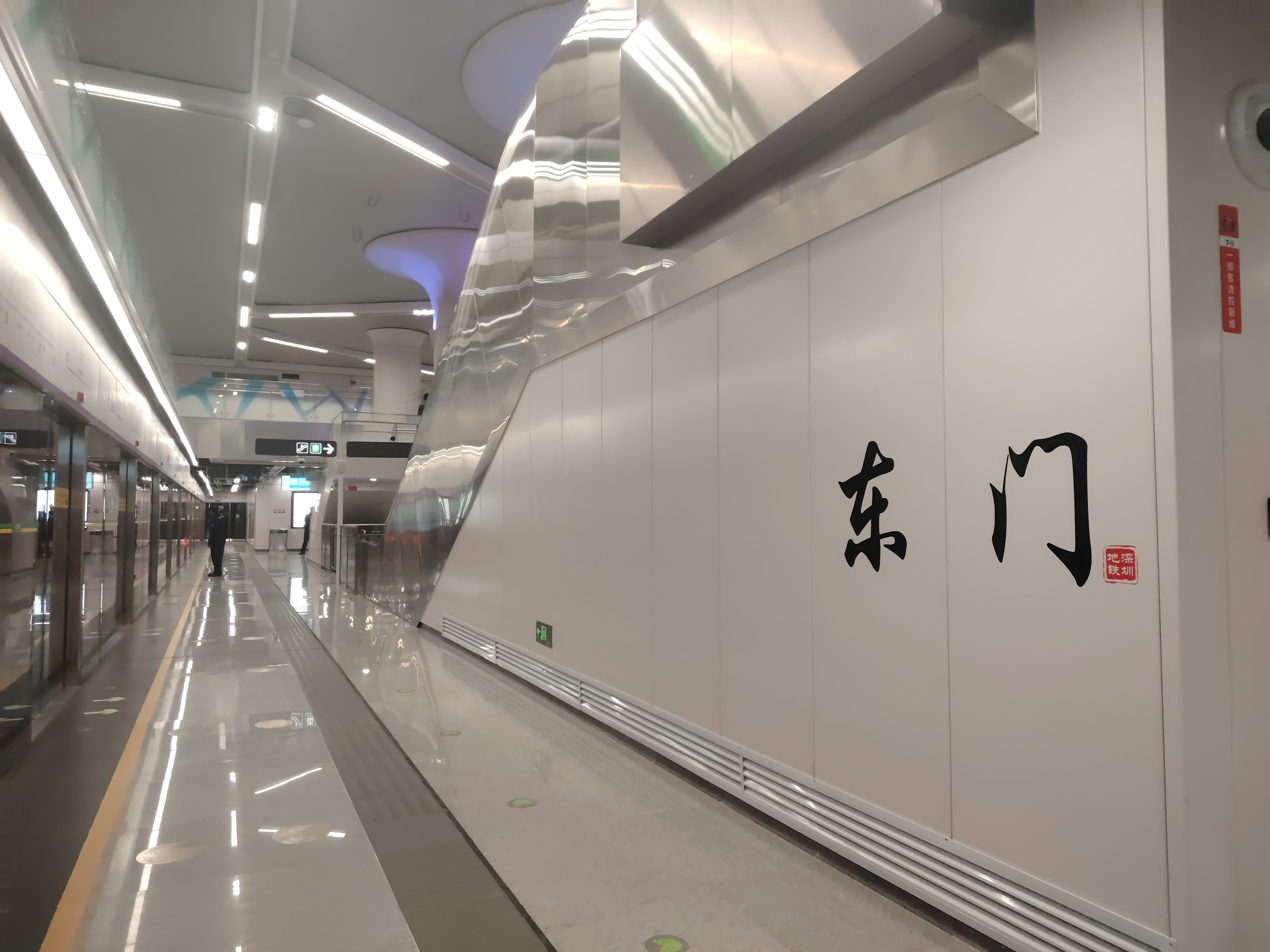
- Platform with Calligraphy

Chinese name
- Traditional Chinese: 東門
- Simplified Chinese: 东门
- Literal meaning: East Gate
Transcriptions
Standard Mandarin
- Hanyu Pinyin: Dōng Mén
Yue: Cantonese
- Yale Romanization: Dūng Mùhn
- Jyutping: dung^{1} mun^{4}

General information
- Location: Shennan East Road; Nanhu Subdistrict, Luohu District, Shenzhen, Guangdong; China
- Coordinates: 22°32′44.1″N 114°6′42.7″E
- Operated by: SZMC (Shenzhen Metro Group)
- Line: Line 5
- Platforms: 2 (1 Island platform)
- Tracks: 2
- Connections: Laojie Station: Line 1; Line 3

Construction
- Structure type: Underground
- Platform levels: 2
- Accessible: Yes

History
- Opened: 28 December 2025 (6 months ago)

Services
Preceding station	Shenzhen Metro	Following station
Grand Theater Terminus	Line 5	Hubei towards Chiwan
Route map
Location

Dongmen station (simplified Chinese: 东门站; traditional Chinese: 東門站; pinyin: Dōngmén Zhàn; Jyutping: dung1 mun4 zaam6; Cantonese Yale: Dūng Mùhn) is a station of Line 5 of the Shenzhen Metro. This station is an indirect interchange with Line 1 and Line 3 at Laojie station which is accessible through an underground corridor. Line 5 platforms opened on 28 December 2025 along with the Line 5 West Extension. This station is located underneath Shennan East Road.

== Station layout ==
G	-	Exit
B1F; Concourse	Lobby	Customer Service, Shops, Vending machines, ATMs
B2F; Platforms	Platform	← 5 towards Grand Theater (terminus)
B2F; Platforms	Island platform, doors will open on the left
B2F; Platforms	Platform	5 towards Chiwan (Hubei) →

== Gallery ==
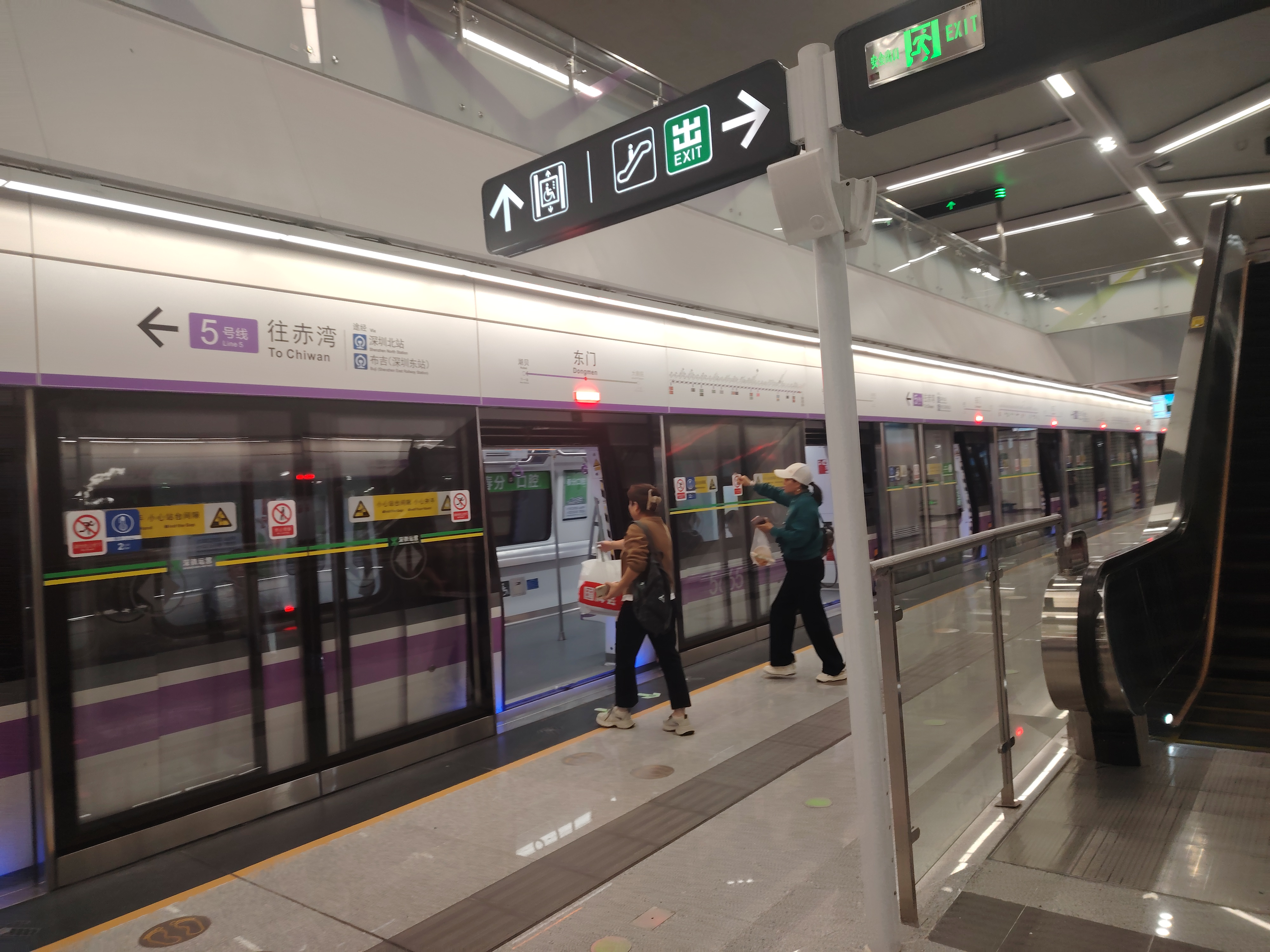
Platform

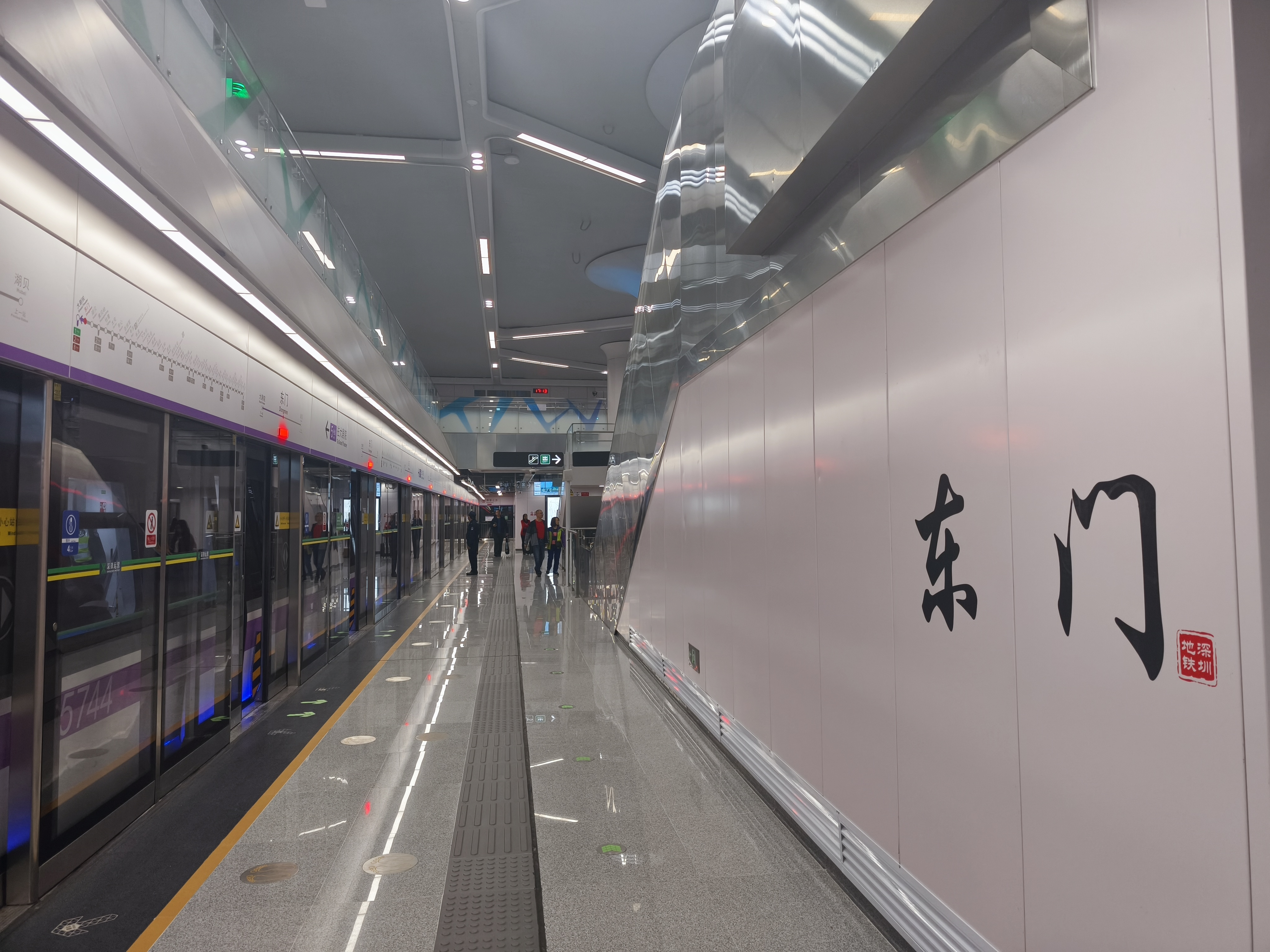
Platform with Calligraphy

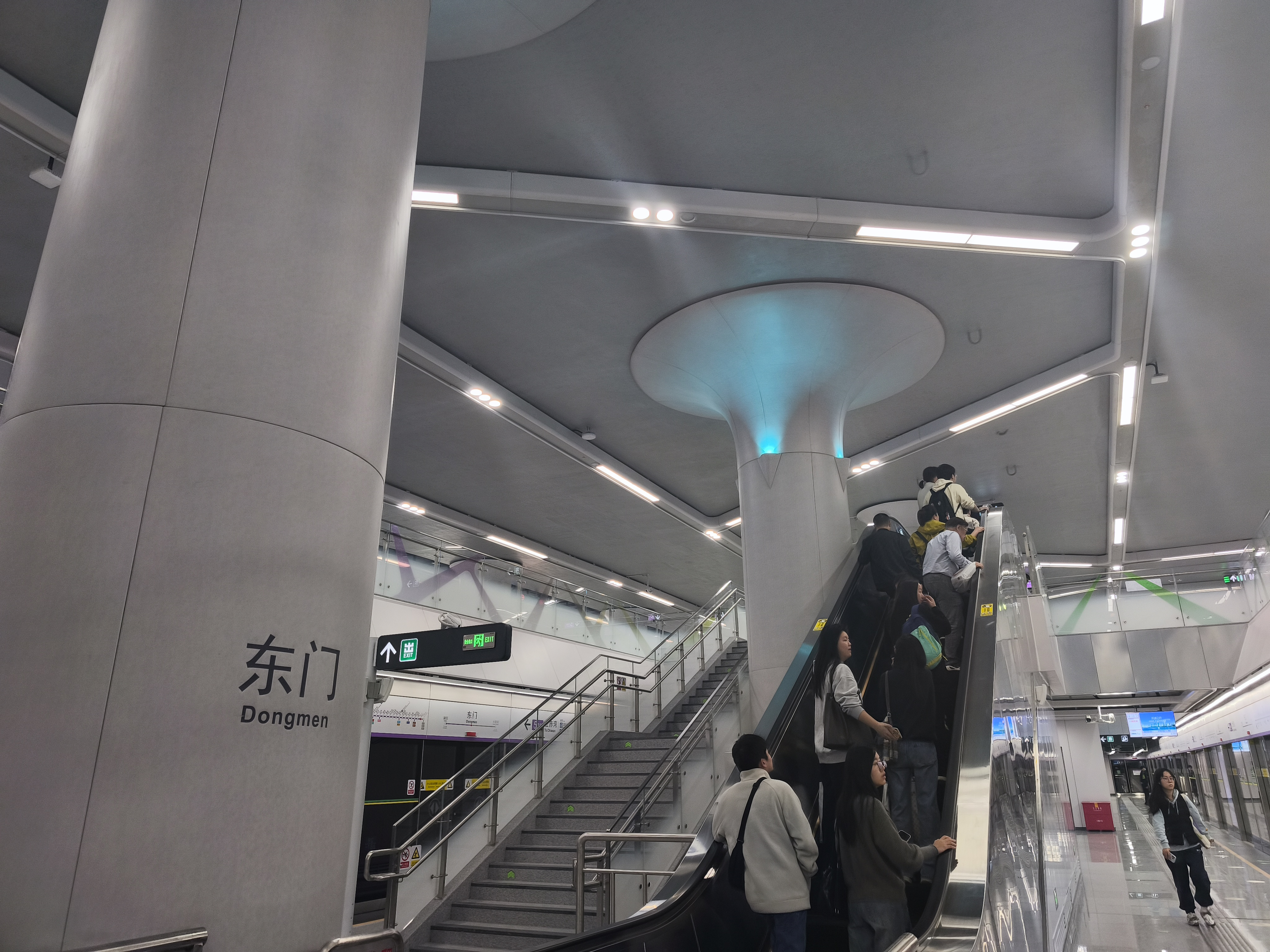
Platform Escalators

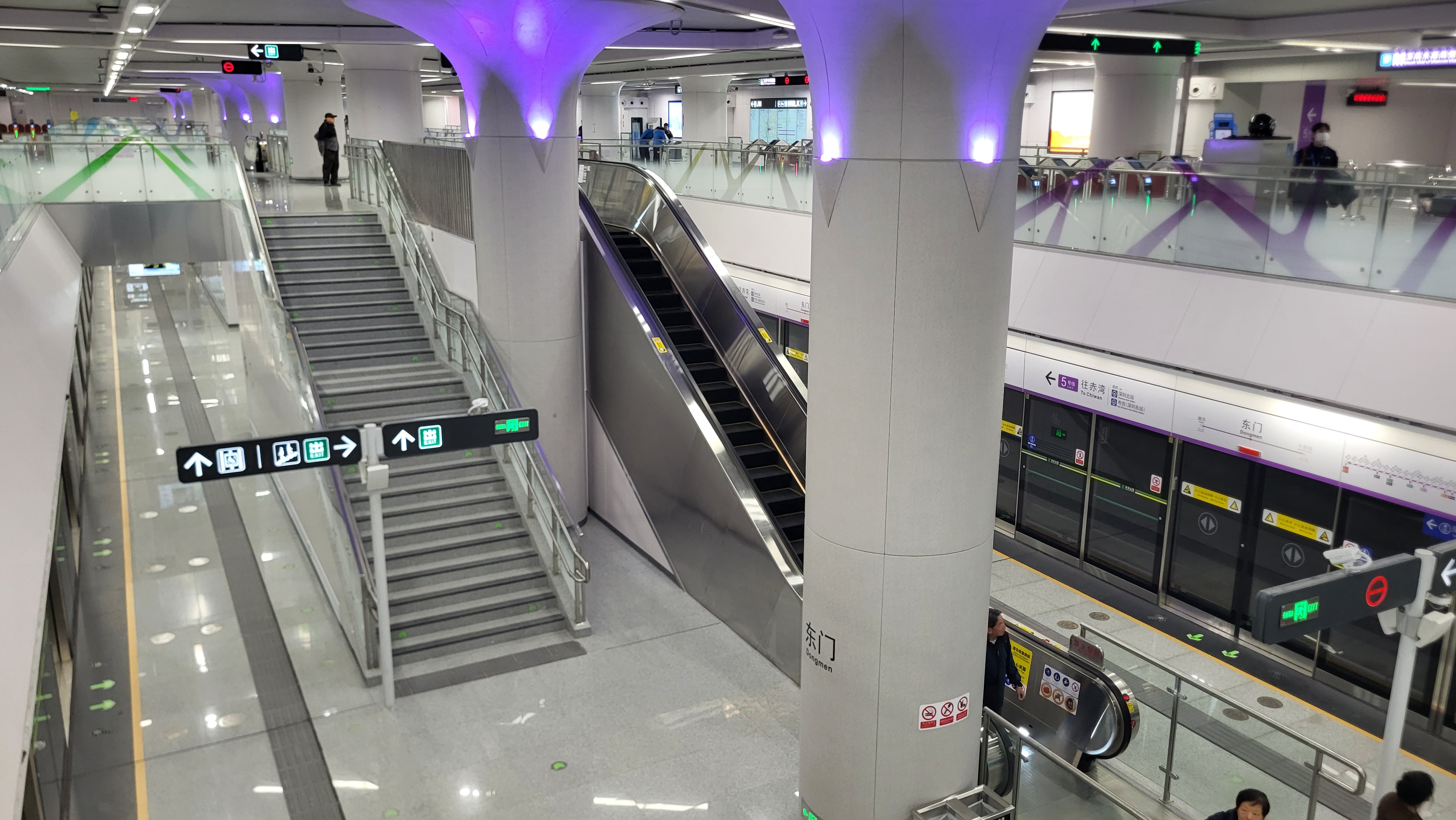
Concourse and Platforms

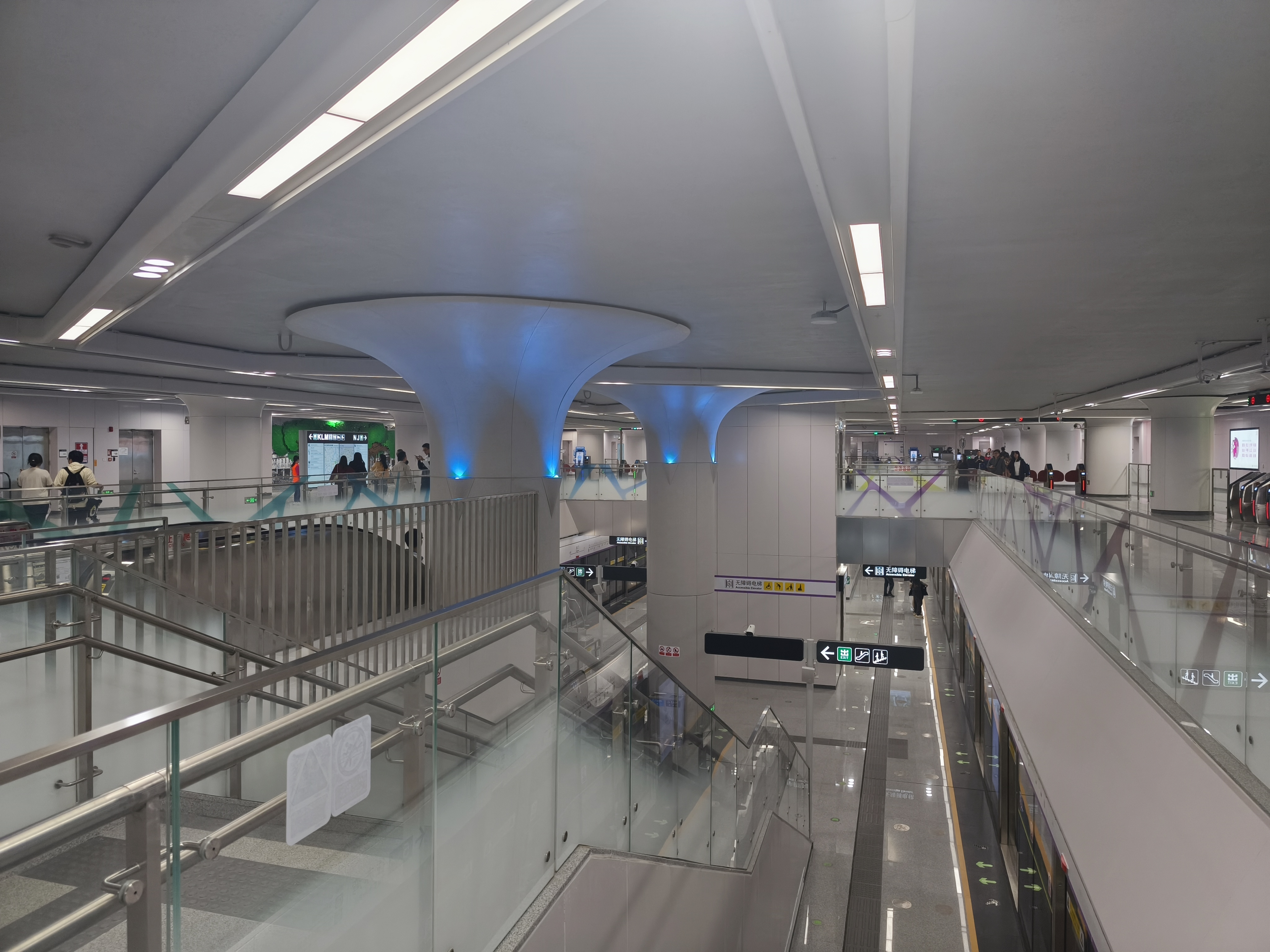
Concourse and Platforms

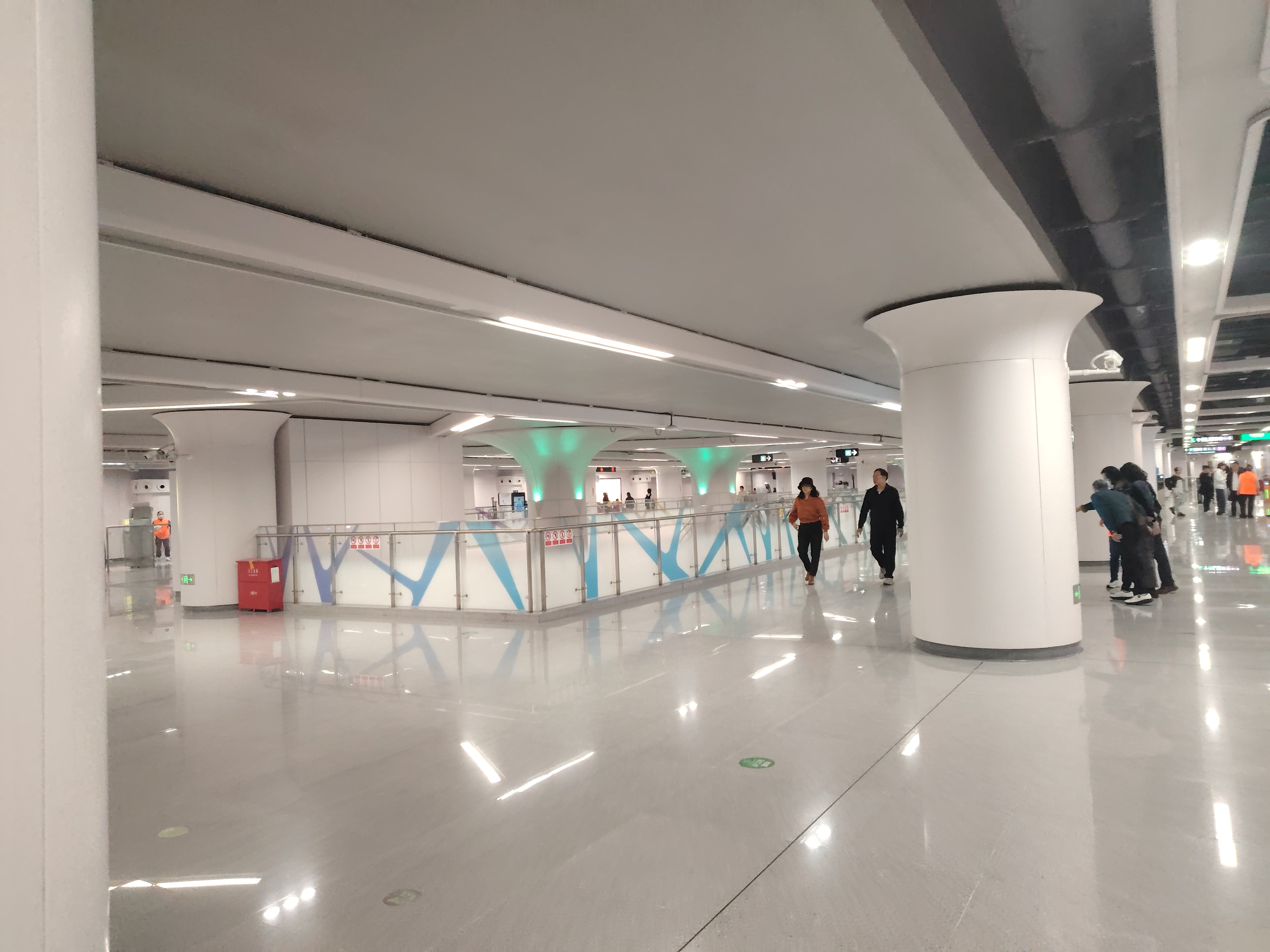
Concourse

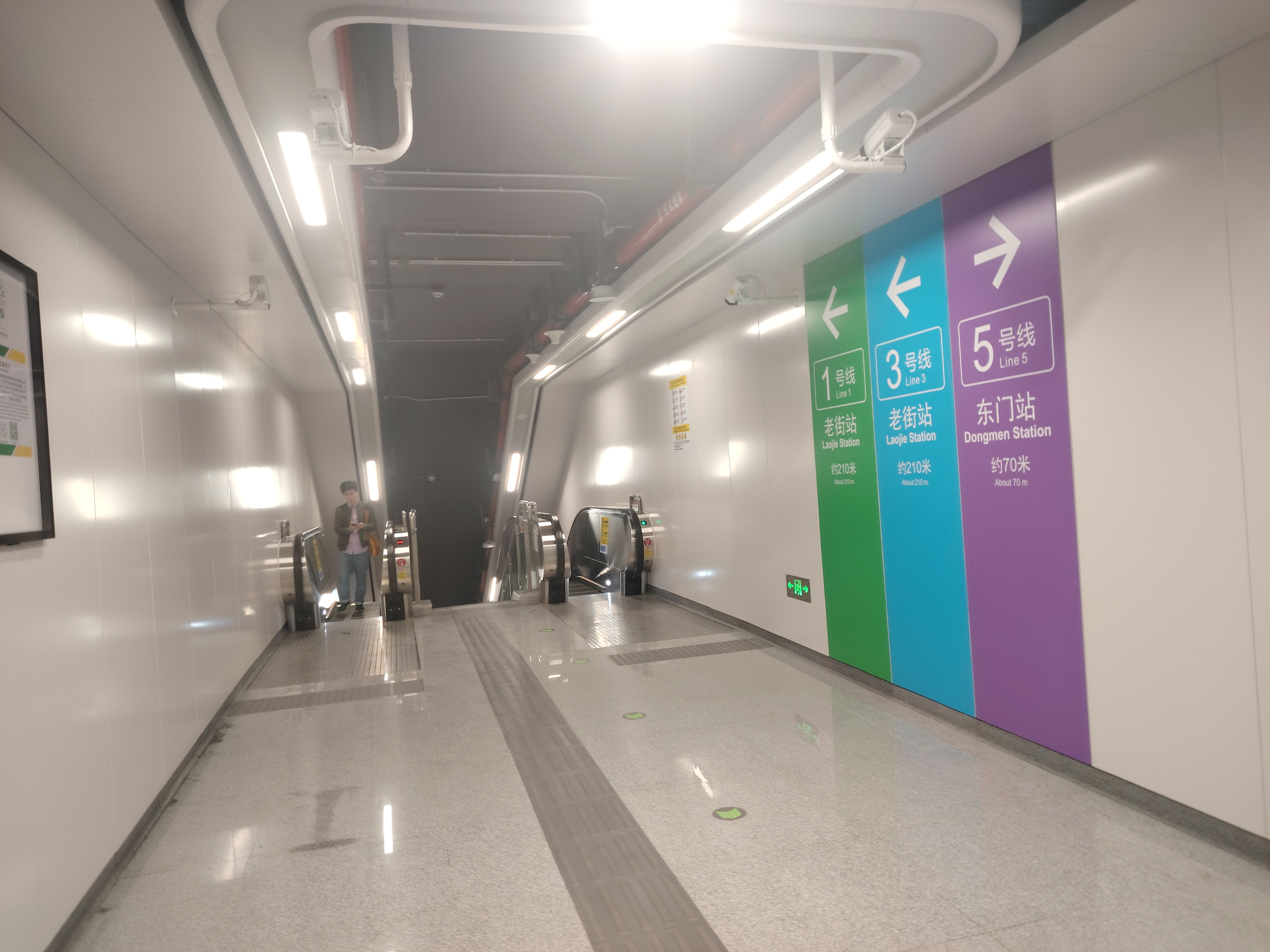
Dongmen and Laojie Transfer Corridor

== Entrances/exits ==
Dongmen has six entrances. Because an underground passageway connecting Dongmen and Laojie exists, the exit code of Dongmen continues from Laojie, starting with "J".

- J1 & J2: North Side of Shennan East Road (E), Dongmen Old Street, Laojie station of lines 1 and 3
- K: North Side of Shennan East Road (M)
- L: North Side of Shennan East Road (W), East Side of Jianshe Road (N)
- M1 & M2: South Side of Shennan East Road (W), East Side of Jianshe Road (S)
- N: South Side of Shennan East Road (E), Renmin South Road
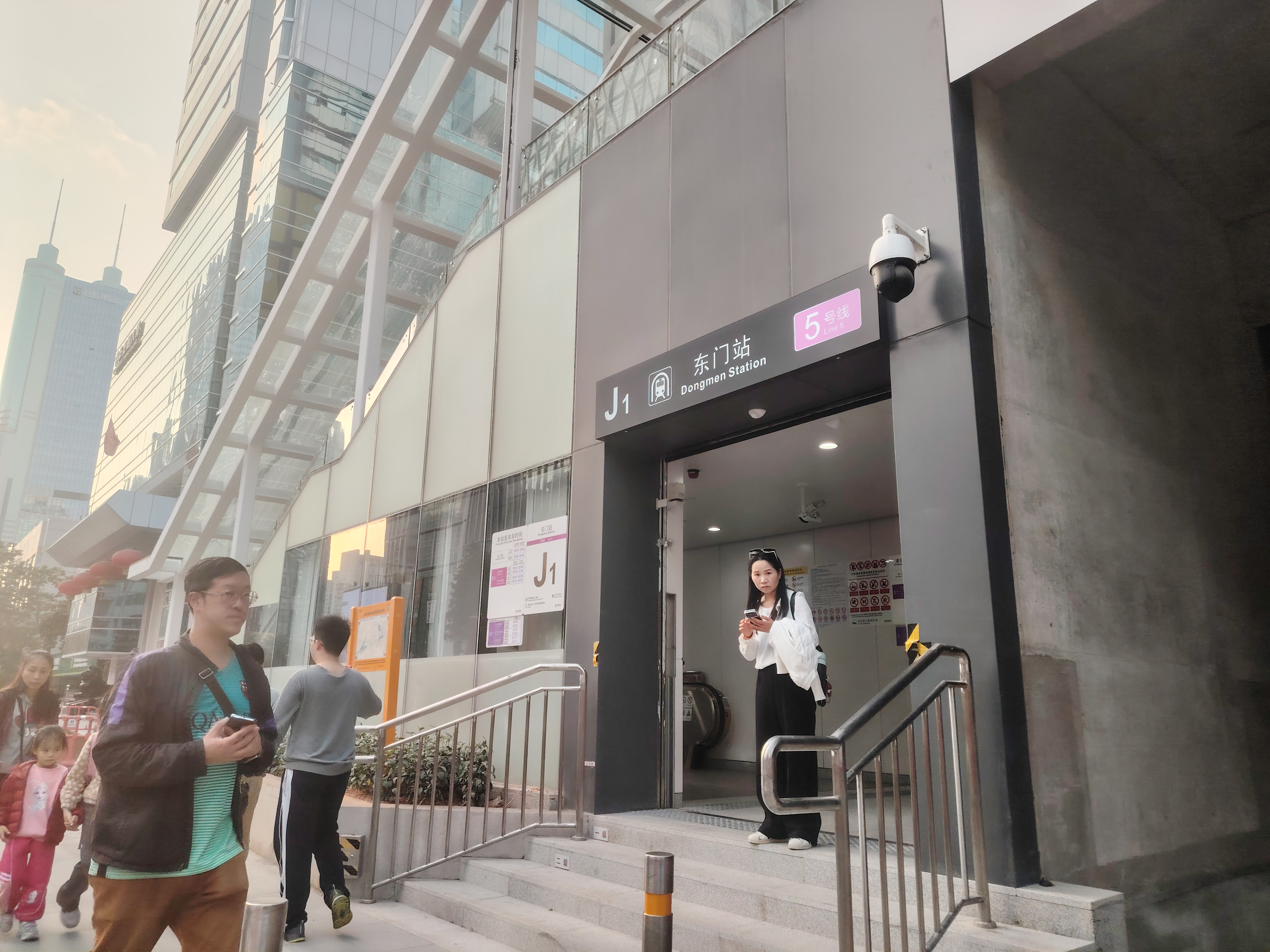
Entrance J1

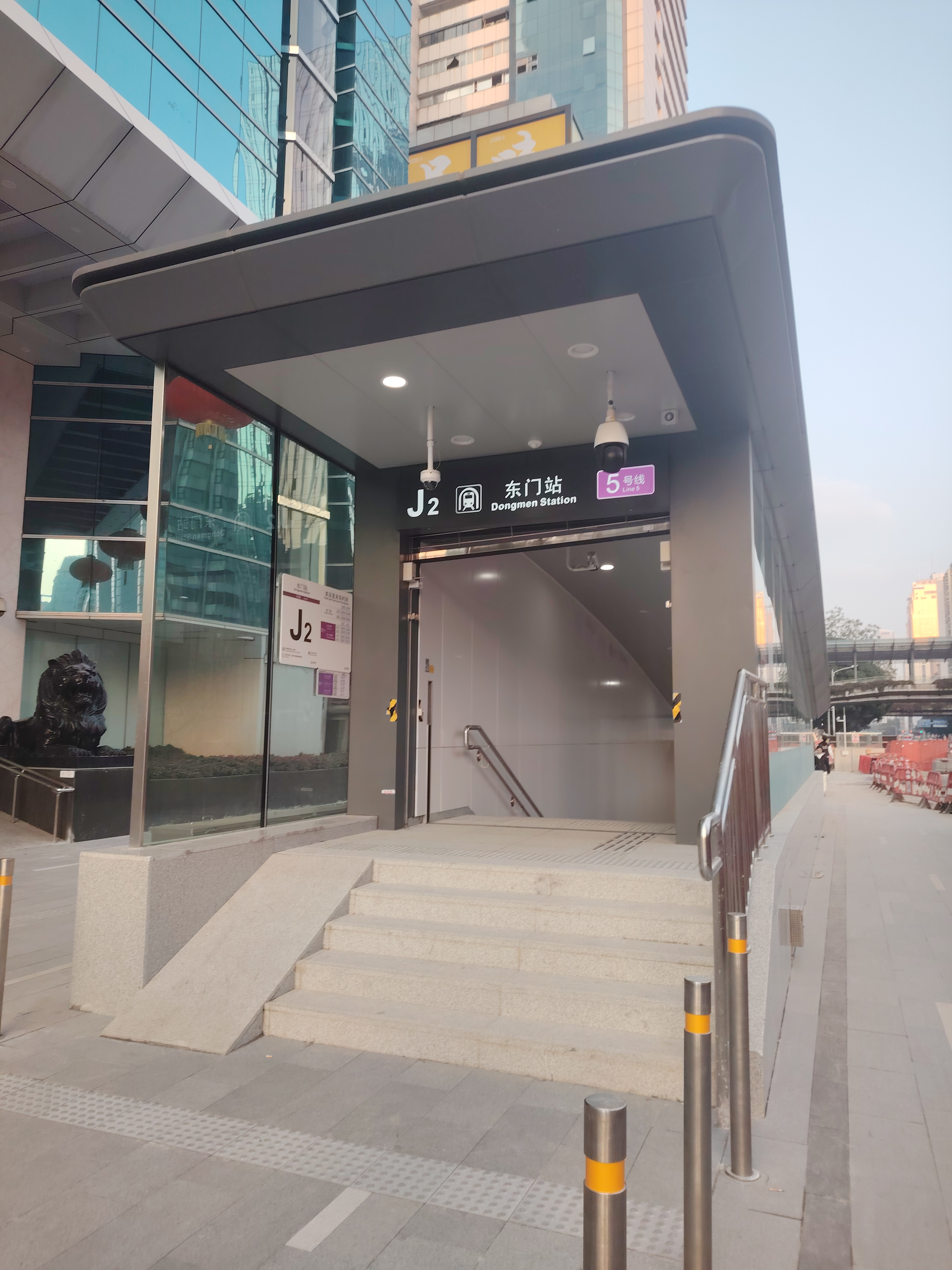
Entrance J2

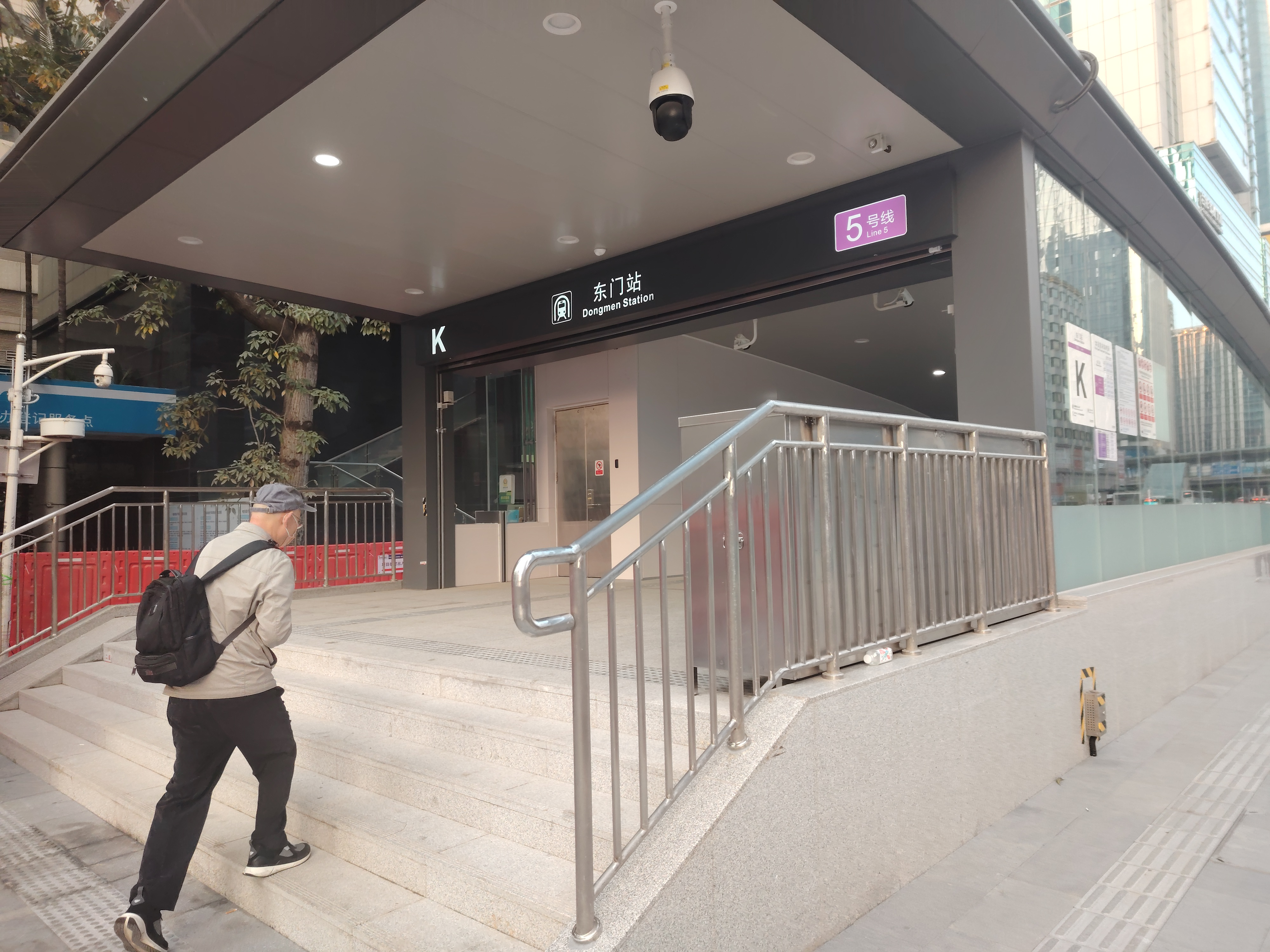
Entrance K

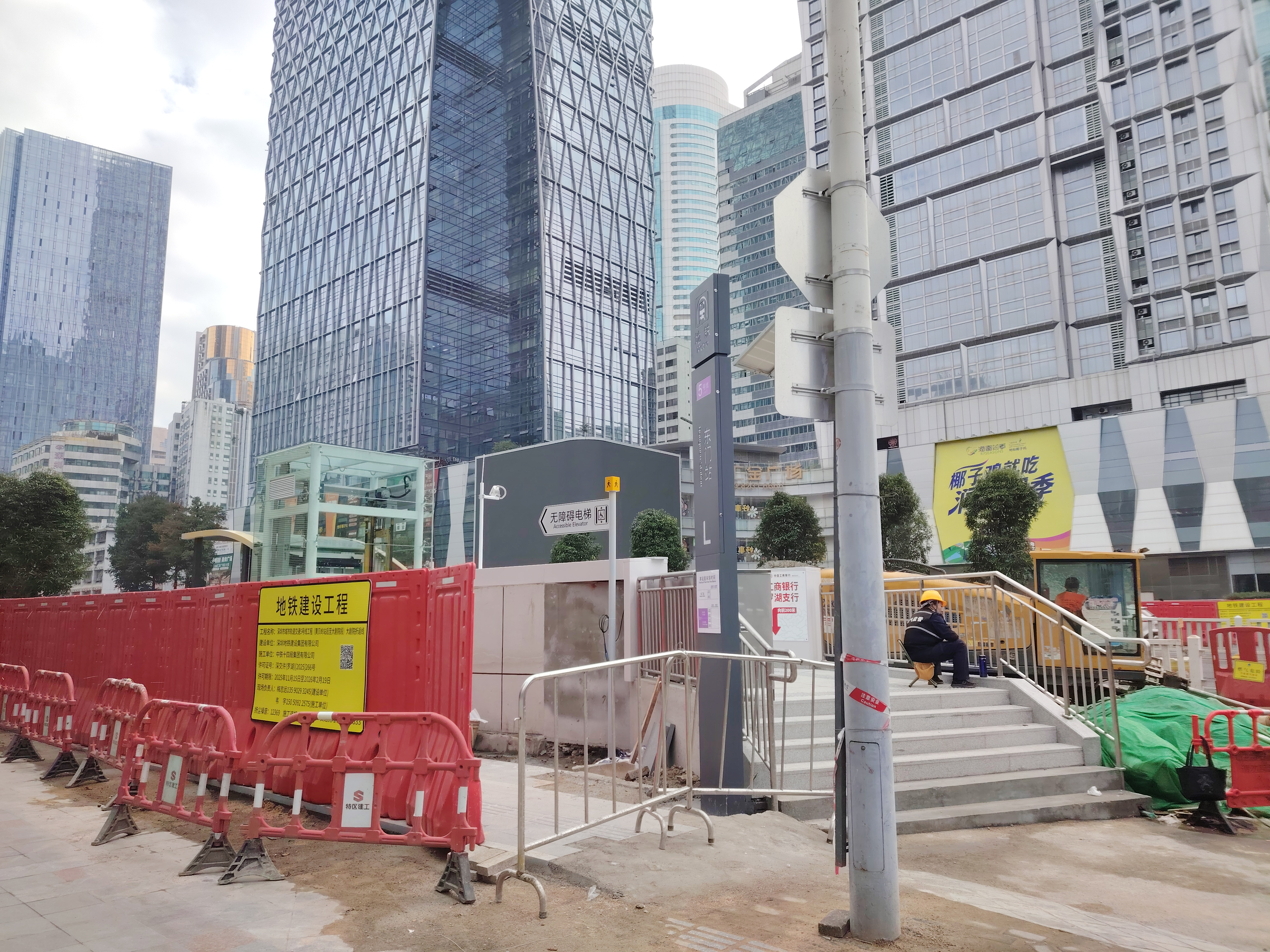
Entrance L

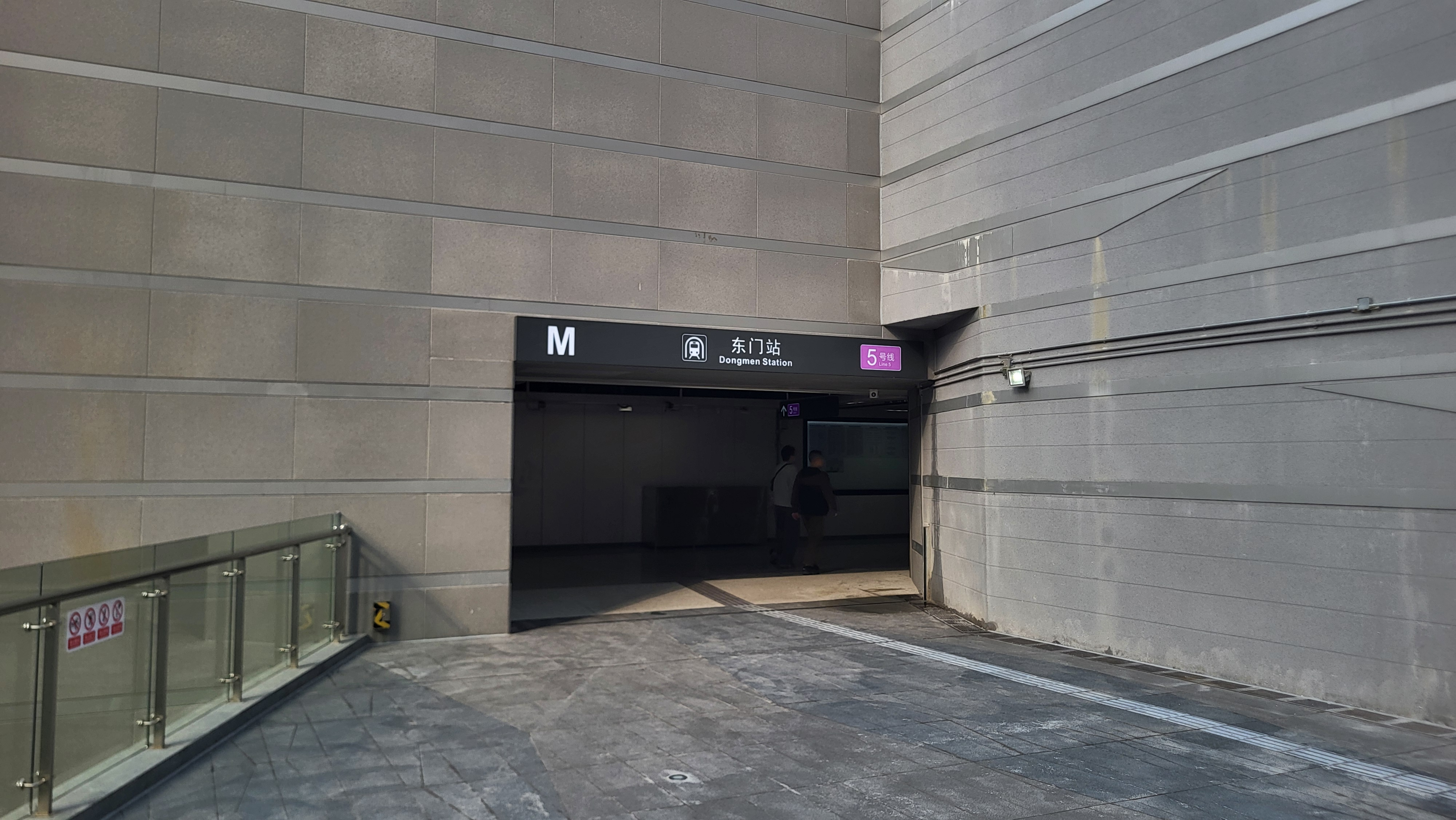
Entrance M
