= Guomao =

Guomao may refer to:

- Guomao, Beijing, area in Chaoyang District, the central business district of Beijing, China
- Guomao Station (Beijing), subway train station at Line 1 and Line 10 of Beijing Subway
- Guomao Station (Shenzhen), subway train station at Line 1 of Shenzhen Metro
