= Cuizhu station =

Metro station in Shenzhen, Guangdong, China

Cuizhu 翠竹
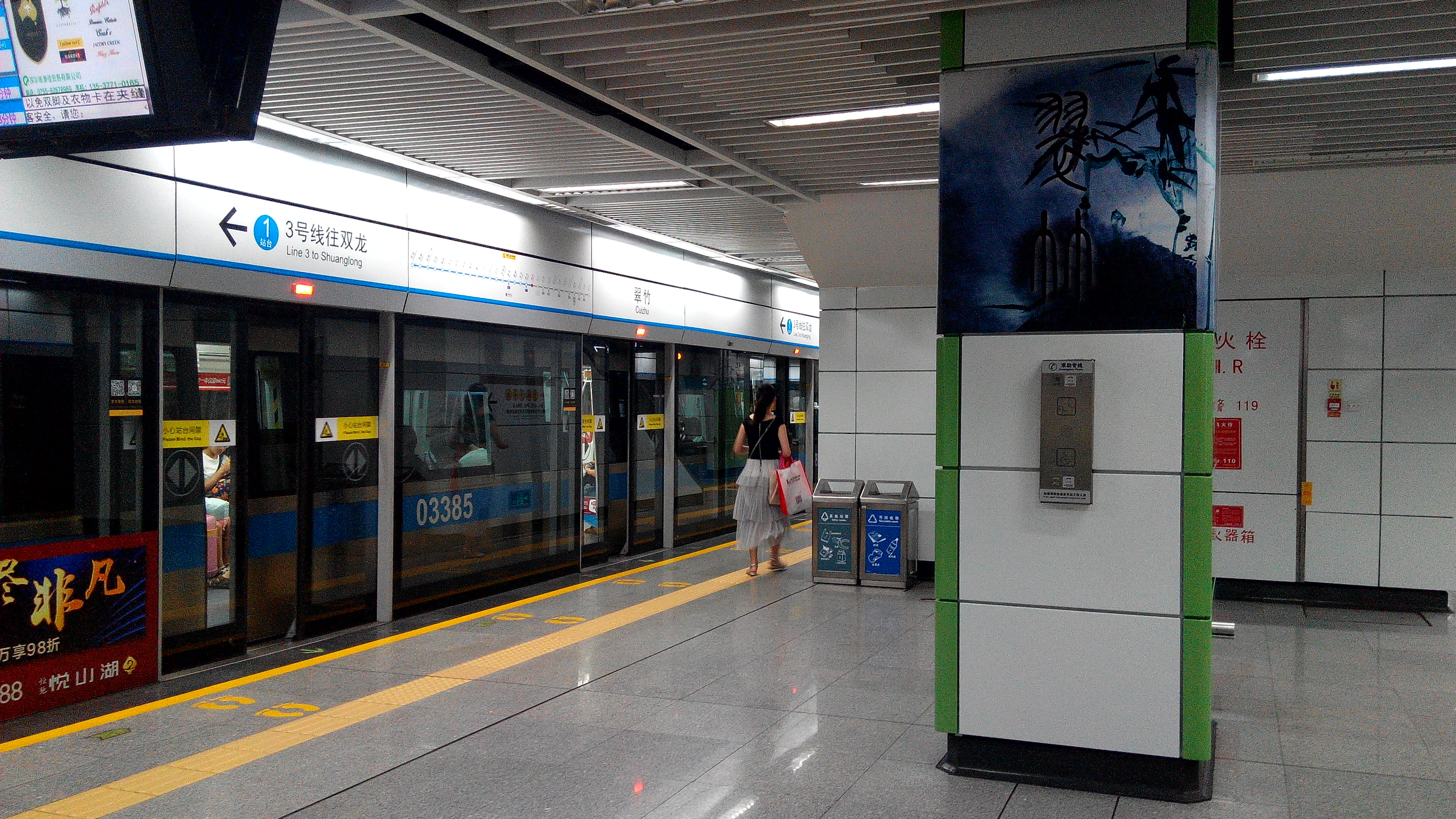
- Platform

General information
- Location: Cuizhu Subdistrict, Luohu District, Shenzhen, Guangdong; China
- Coordinates: 22°33′24″N 114°7′49″E
- Operator: Shenzhen Metro Line 3 Operations
- Line: Line 3
- Platforms: 2 (1 island platform)
- Tracks: 2

Construction
- Structure type: Underground
- Accessible: Yes

History
- Opened: 28 June 2011 (15 years ago)

Services
Preceding station	Shenzhen Metro	Following station
Tianbei towards Pingdi Liulian	Line 3	Shaibu towards Futian Bonded Area
Location

Cuizhu station (Chinese: 翠竹站; pinyin: Cuìzhú Zhàn; Jyutping: ceoi3 zuk1 zaam6) is a station on Line 3 of the Shenzhen Metro. It opened on 28 June 2011. It is located at Cuizhu Road, Cuizhu Subdistrict, Luohu District, Shenzhen, China.

== Station layout ==
G	-	Exits B-D
B1F; Concourse	Lobby	Ticket Machines, Customer Service, Shops, Vending Machines
B2F; Platforms	Platform	3 towards Futian Bonded Area (Shaibu)
B2F; Platforms	Island platform, doors will open on the left
B2F; Platforms	Platform	3 towards Pingdi Liulian (Tianbei)

== Exits ==
Exit		Destination
Exit B	B1	Dongmen North Road (S), Huali Road (W), Cuiyuan Middle School
Exit B	B2	Dongmen North Road (S), Huali Road (E), Cuihua Garden
Exit C		Dongmen North Road (N), Cuizhu Road, Cuizhu Estates
Exit D		Dongmen North Road (N), Shenzhen People's Hospital, Sun Yat-sen Cardiovascular Hospital
