= Grand Theater station (Shenzhen Metro) =

Metro station in Shenzhen, Guangdong, China

Grand Theater 大剧院
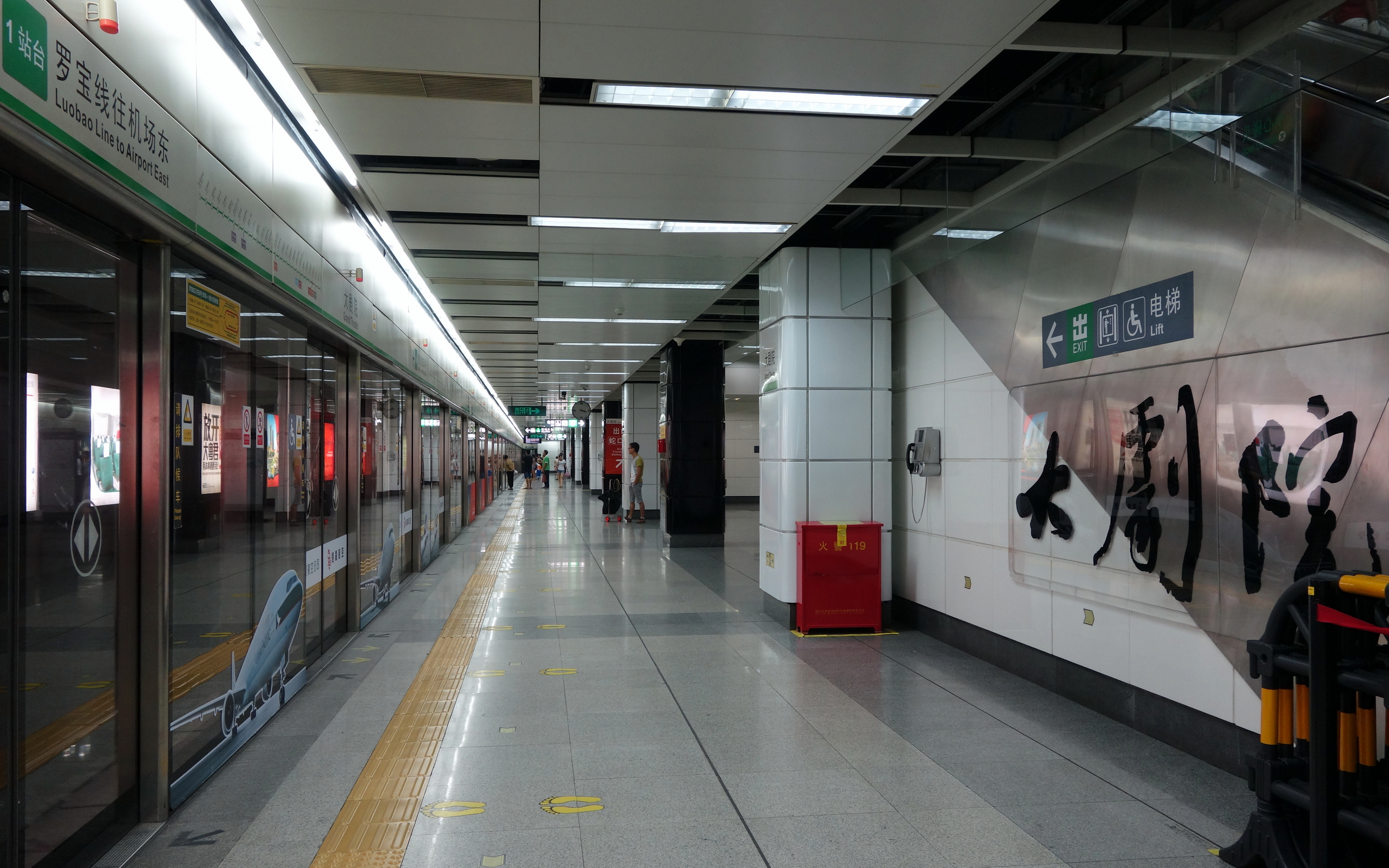
- Line 1 platform

Chinese name
- Traditional Chinese: 大劇院
- Simplified Chinese: 大剧院
Transcriptions
Standard Mandarin
- Hanyu Pinyin: Dà Jùyuàn
Yue: Cantonese
- Jyutping: Daai6 Kek6 Jyun2

General information
- Location: Shennan East Road / Jiefang Road (解放路); Luohu District, Shenzhen, Guangdong; China
- Coordinates: 22°32′38.26″N 114°6′9.86″E
- Operator: SZMC (Shenzhen Metro Group)
- Lines: Line 1; Line 2; Line 5
- Platforms: 4 (2 island platforms)
- Tracks: 4
- Connections: 9 11 (Hongling South)

Construction
- Structure type: Underground
- Accessible: Yes

History
- Opened: Line 1: 28 December 2004 (21 years ago); Line 2: 28 June 2011 (15 years ago); Line 5: 28 December 2025 (9 months ago)
- Former names: Da Ju Yuan

Passengers
- 2015: 65,440 daily
- Rank: 5th of 118

Services
Preceding station	Shenzhen Metro	Following station
Science Museum towards Airport East	Line 1	Laojie towards Luohu
Yannan towards Chiwan	Line 2	Hubei towards Liantang (Line 8: Xichong)
Terminus	Line 5	Dongmen towards Chiwan
Out-of-station interchange
Ludancun towards Wenjin	Line 9 transfer at Hongling South	Hongling towards Qianwan
Huaqiang South towards Bitou	Line 11 transfer at Hongling South	Terminus
Route map
Location

Grand Theater station (simplified Chinese: 大剧院站; traditional Chinese: 大劇院站; pinyin: Dà Jùyuàn Zhàn; Jyutping: Daai6 Kek6 Jyun2 Zaam6), formerly Da Ju Yuan is an interchange station between Line 1, Line 2 and Line 5 of the Shenzhen Metro. The Line 1 platforms opened on 28 December 2004, the Line 2 platforms opened on 28 June 2011 and the Line 5 platforms opened on 28 December 2025. It is located underneath the junction of Shennan Donglu (深南东路) and Jiefang Road (解放路) in the Luohu District of Shenzhen, China. The station takes its name from the Shenzhen Grand Theater (深圳大剧院). It is the closest station to The MixC (a major luxury shopping mall) and the Shenzhen Book City. It is an interchange station between Lines 1, 2 and 5, and an indirect interchange with Line 9 and Line 11 at Hongling South Station.

== Station layout ==
G	-	Exit
B1F; Concourse	Lobby	Ticket Machines, Customer service, Shops, Transfer passage toward 9 Hongling South, Reserved passage toward 11 Hongling South, Passage toward KK100
B2F; 1 5 Platforms		1 towards Airport East (Science Museum)
B2F; 1 5 Platforms	Island platform, doors will open on the left
B2F; 1 5 Platforms		1 towards Luohu (Laojie)
B2F; 1 5 Platforms	Side platform, doors will open on the right for alighting passengers only
B2F; 1 5 Platforms		5 towards Chiwan (Dongmen)
B2F; 1 5 Platforms		5 towards Chiwan (Dongmen)
B2F; 1 5 Platforms	Side platform, doors will open on the right for boarding passengers only
B2F; 1 5 Platforms	-	Station Equipment
B3F; 2 Platforms		2 towards Chiwan (Yannan)
B3F; 2 Platforms	Island platform, doors will open on the left
B3F; 2 Platforms		8 towards Xichong (Hubei)

=== Gallery ===
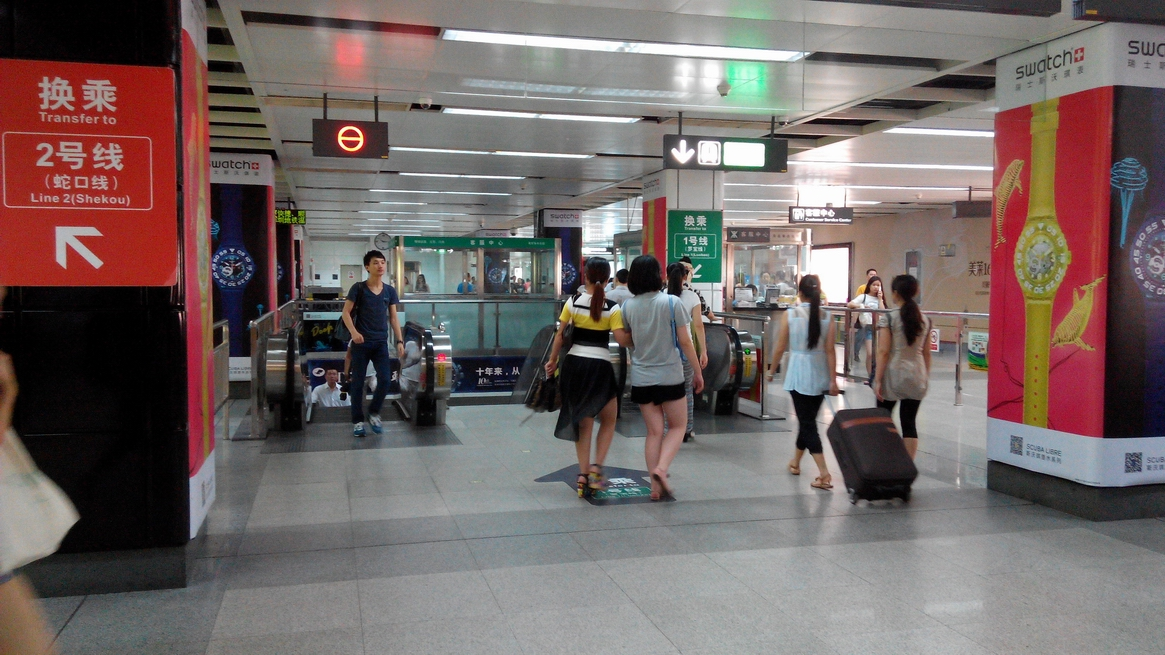
Line 1 concourse

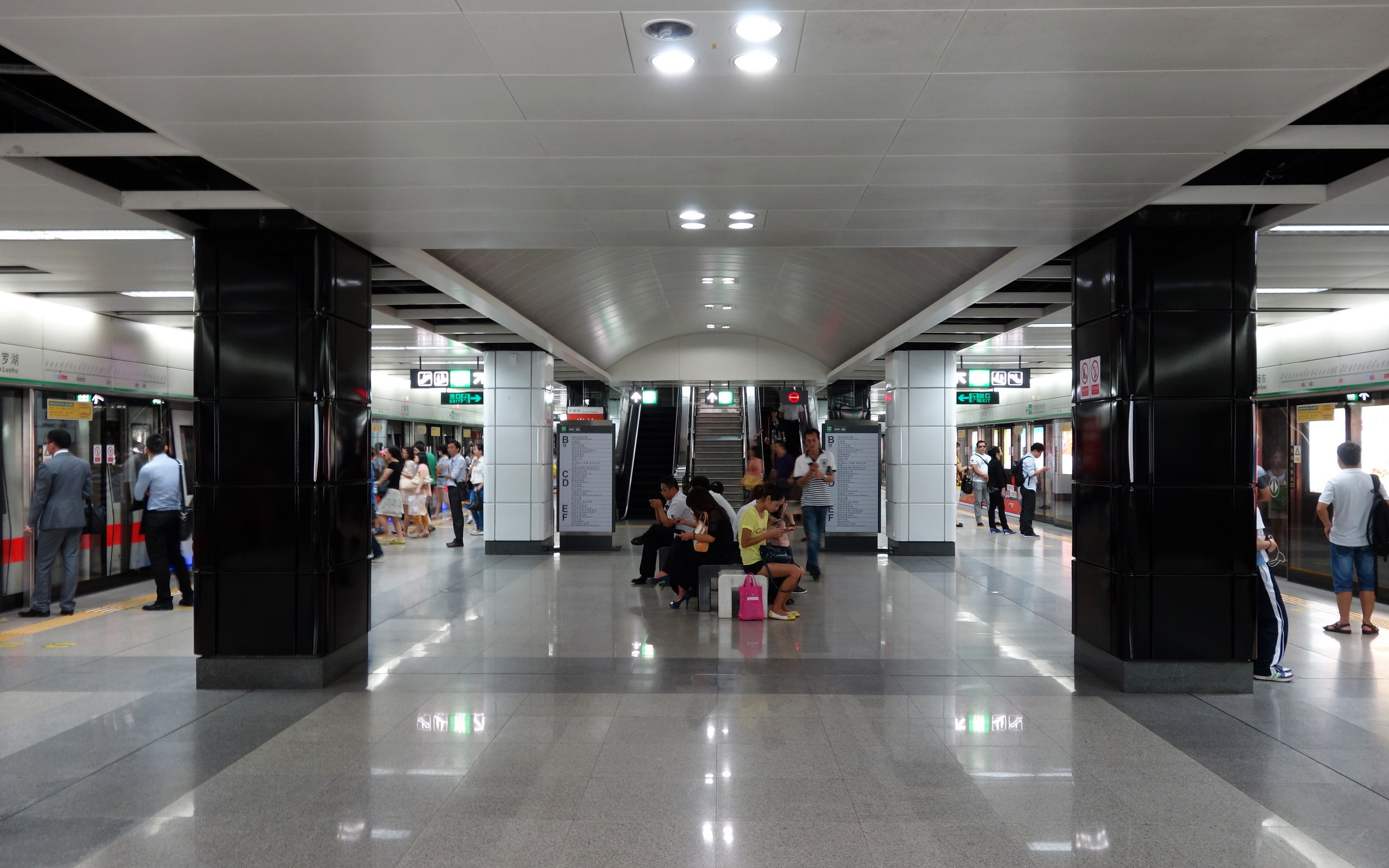
Line 1 platform

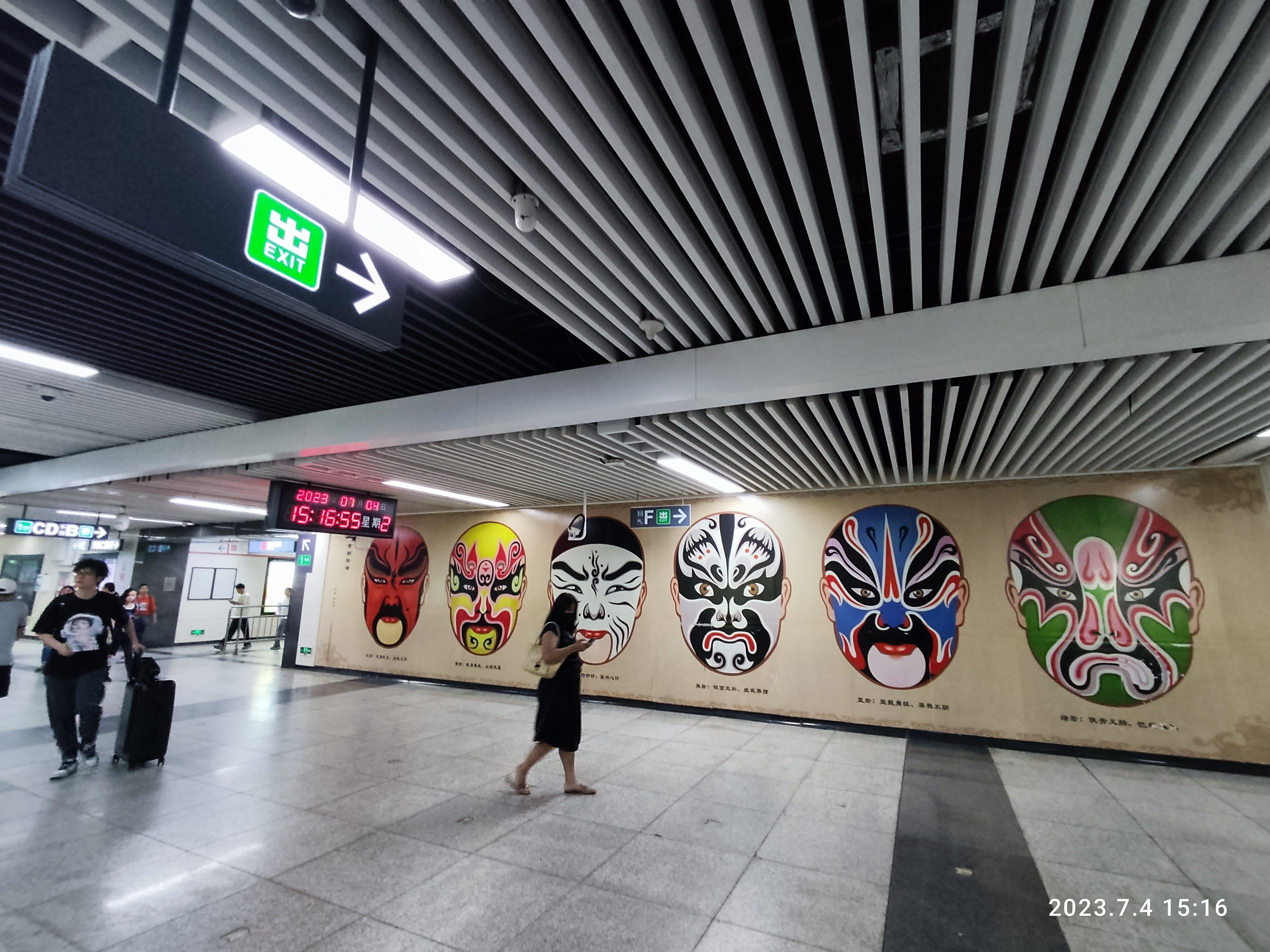
Line 2 concourse

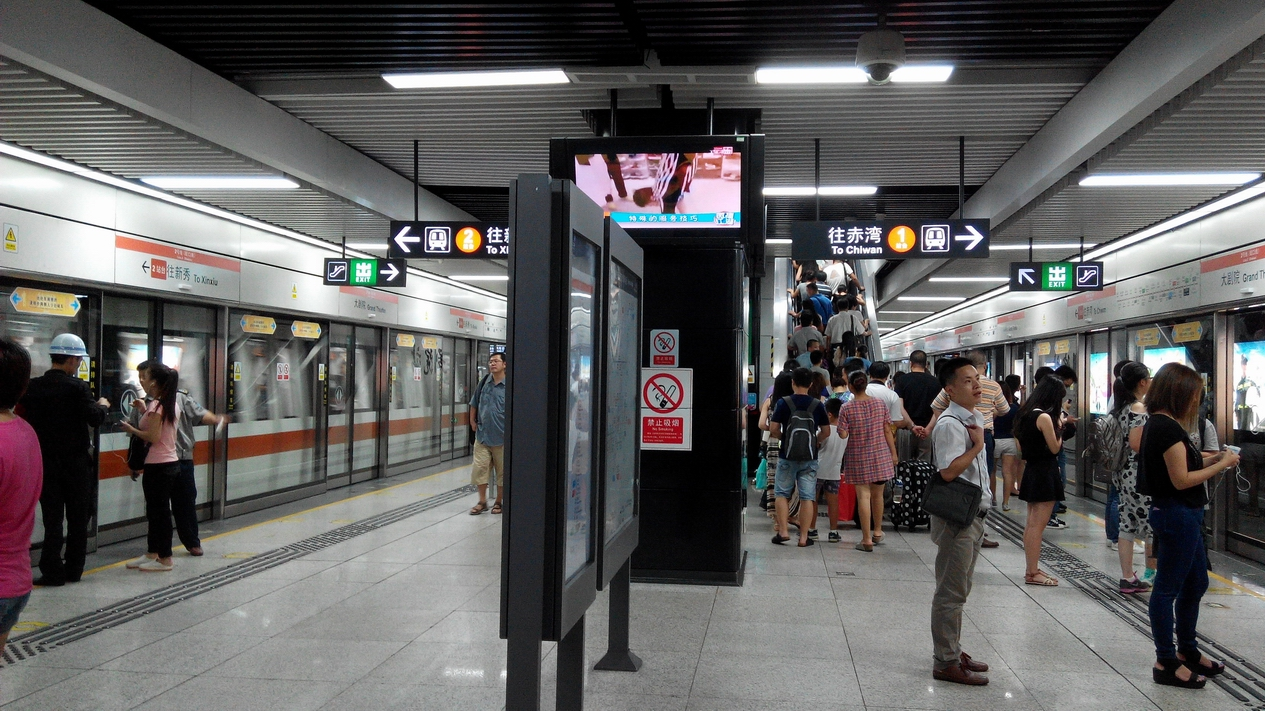
Line 2 platform

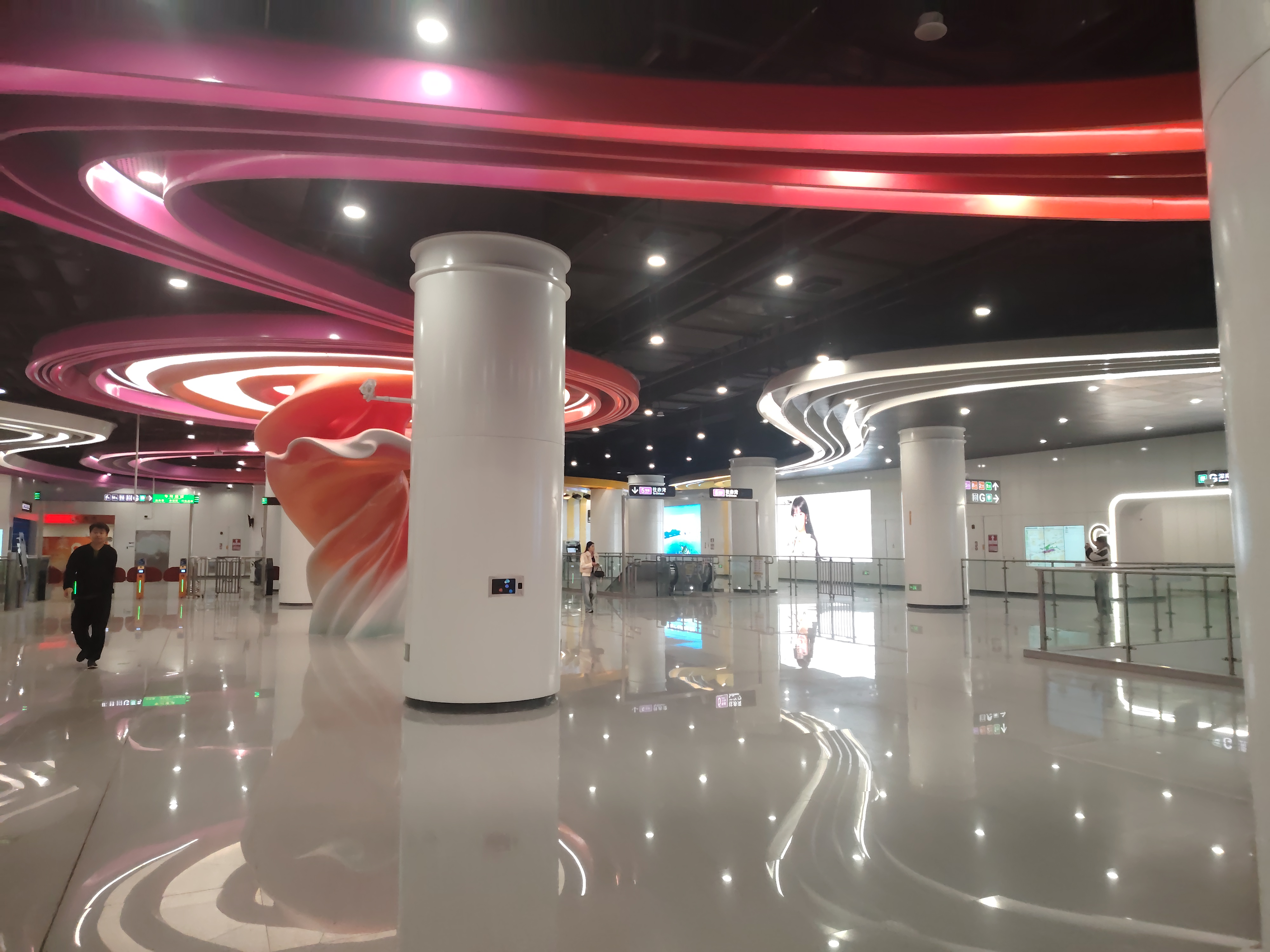
Line 5 concourse

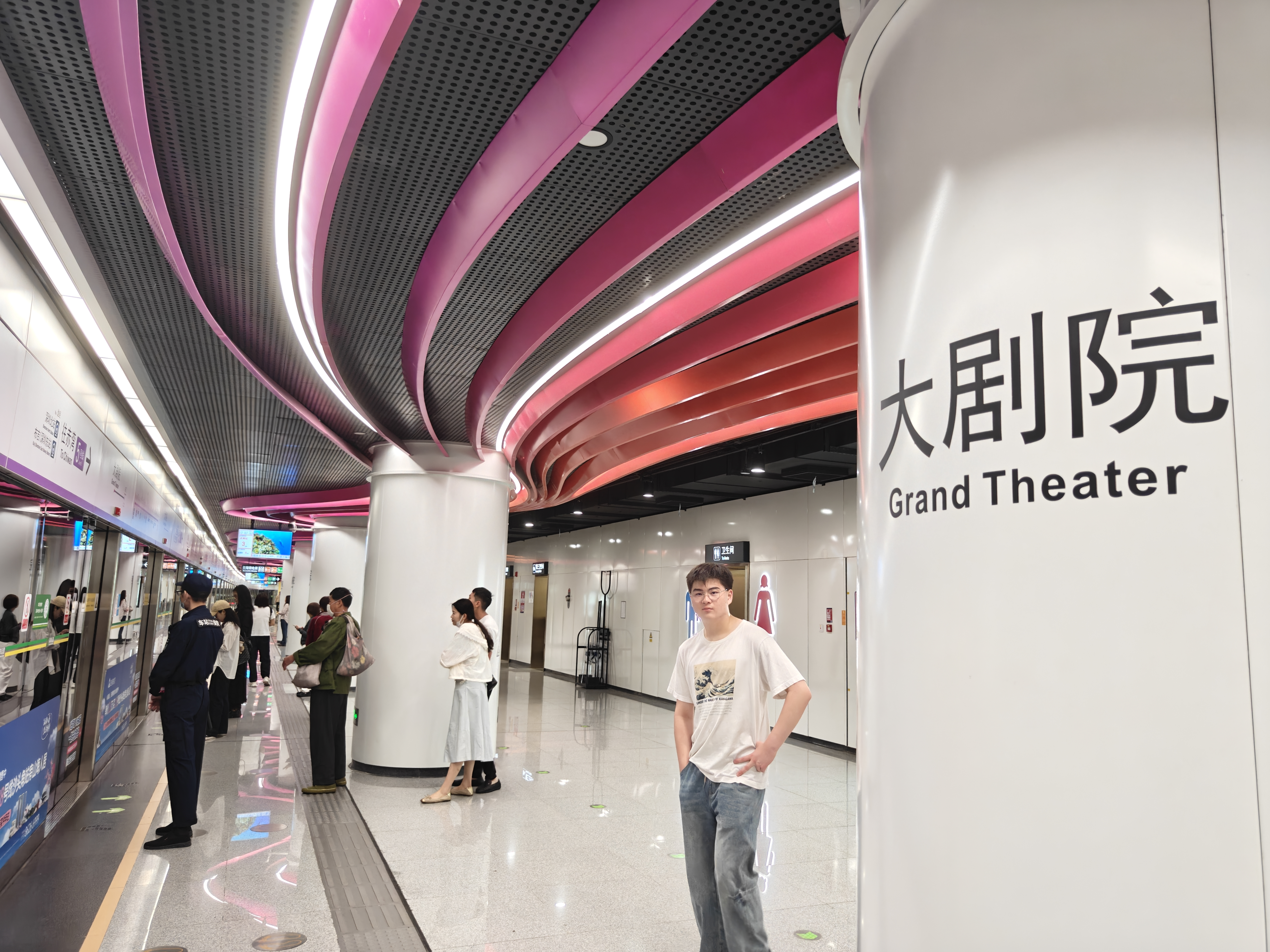
Line 5 starting platform

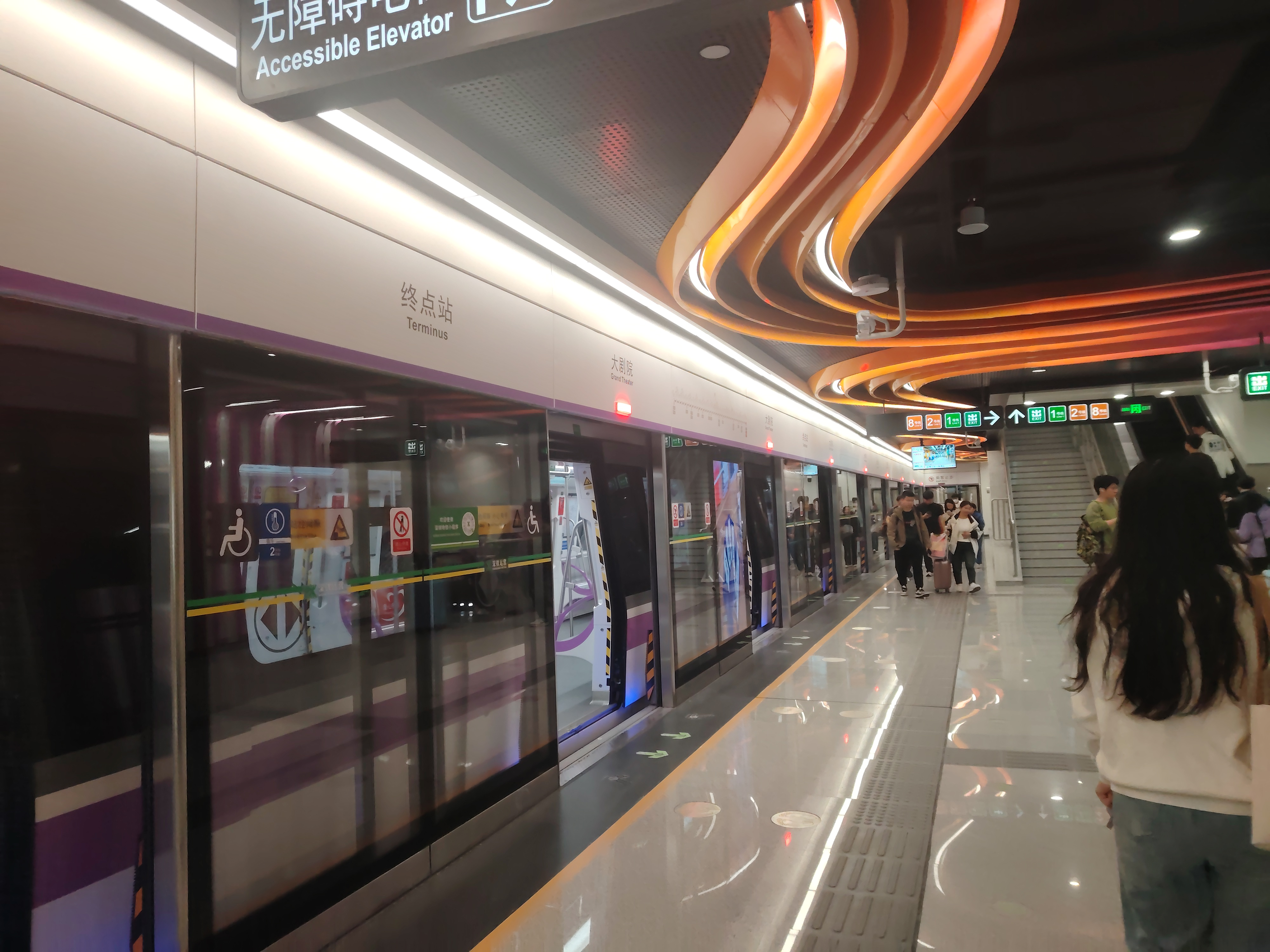
Line 5 termination platform

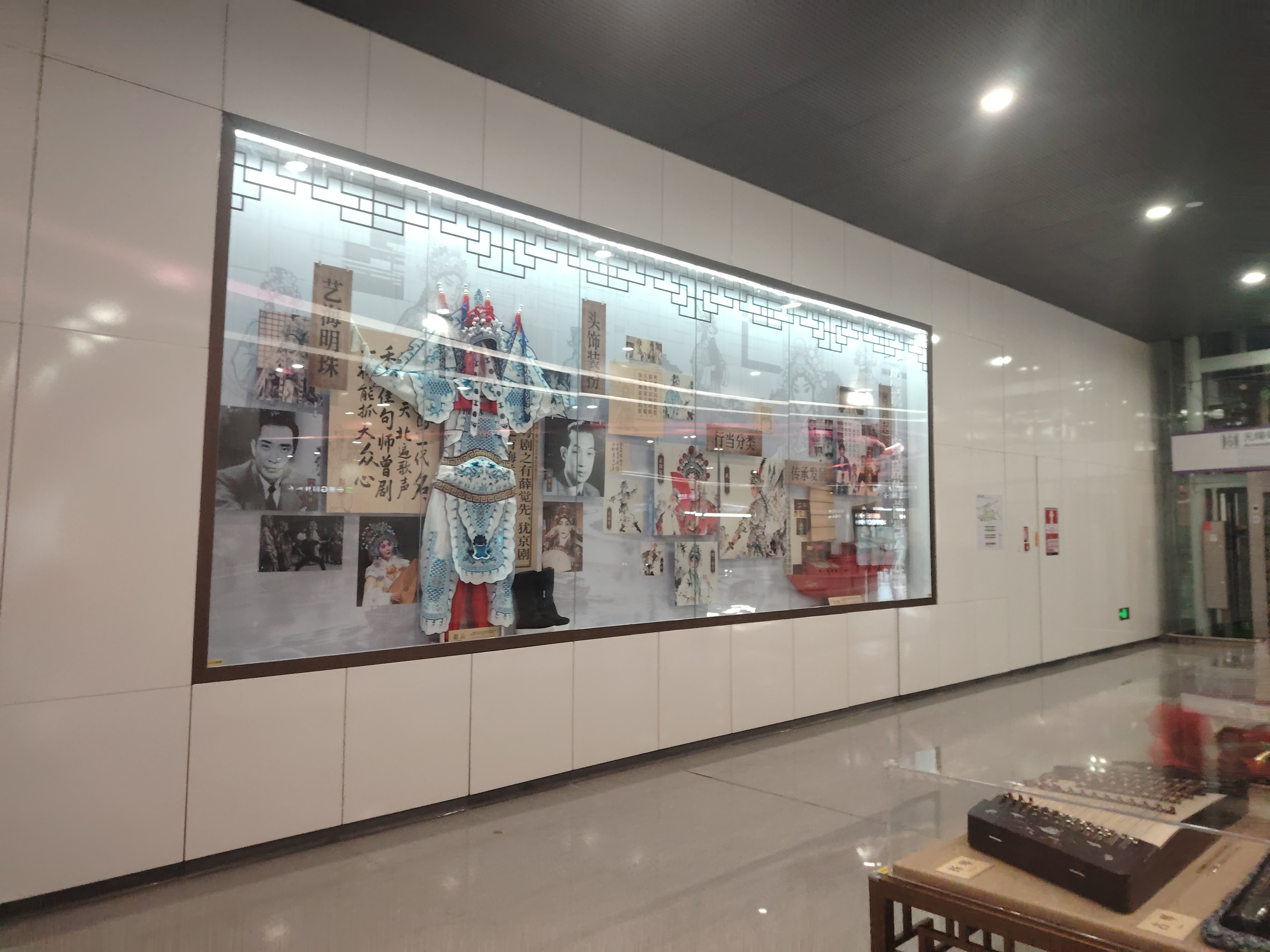
Line 5 station art wall

=== Entrances/exits ===
The station has 6 points of entry/exit, with Exits F and G being accessible via elevators.

- B: north side of Shennan East Road, Hongling Middle Road, Portrait of Deng Xiaoping, Grand Theater, Shenzhen Lichee Park, KK100
- C: north side of Shennan East Road
- D: Jiefang Road, Bao'an South Road (宝安南路), Shun Hing Square, Shenzhen Municipal Public Security Bureau, Shenzhen Open University
- E: south side of Shennan East Road, Jintang Street (金塘街), Ping An Bank Building, Regent Building (丽晶大厦), Financial Center Building, 11 Hongling South exit G
- F: south side of Shennan East Road, Shum Yip Center Building (深业中心大厦), Jinshan Building (金山大厦), Shenzhen Book City, City F. Garden (都市名园)
- G: south side of Shennan East Road, Jinshan Building, Shenzhen Book City, Jinfengcheng Building (金丰城大厦), China Resources Building, Shenzhen MIXC
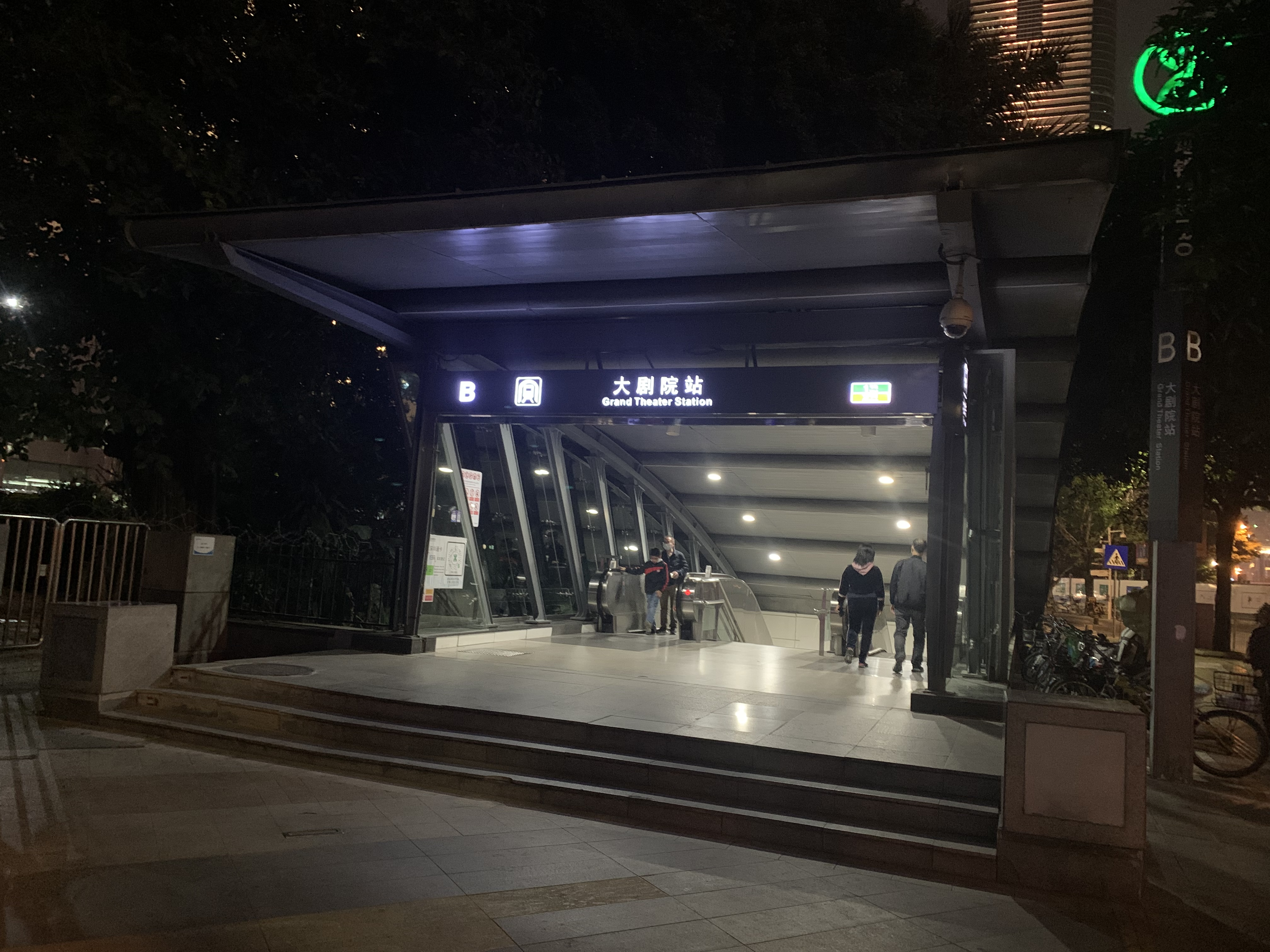
Entrance B

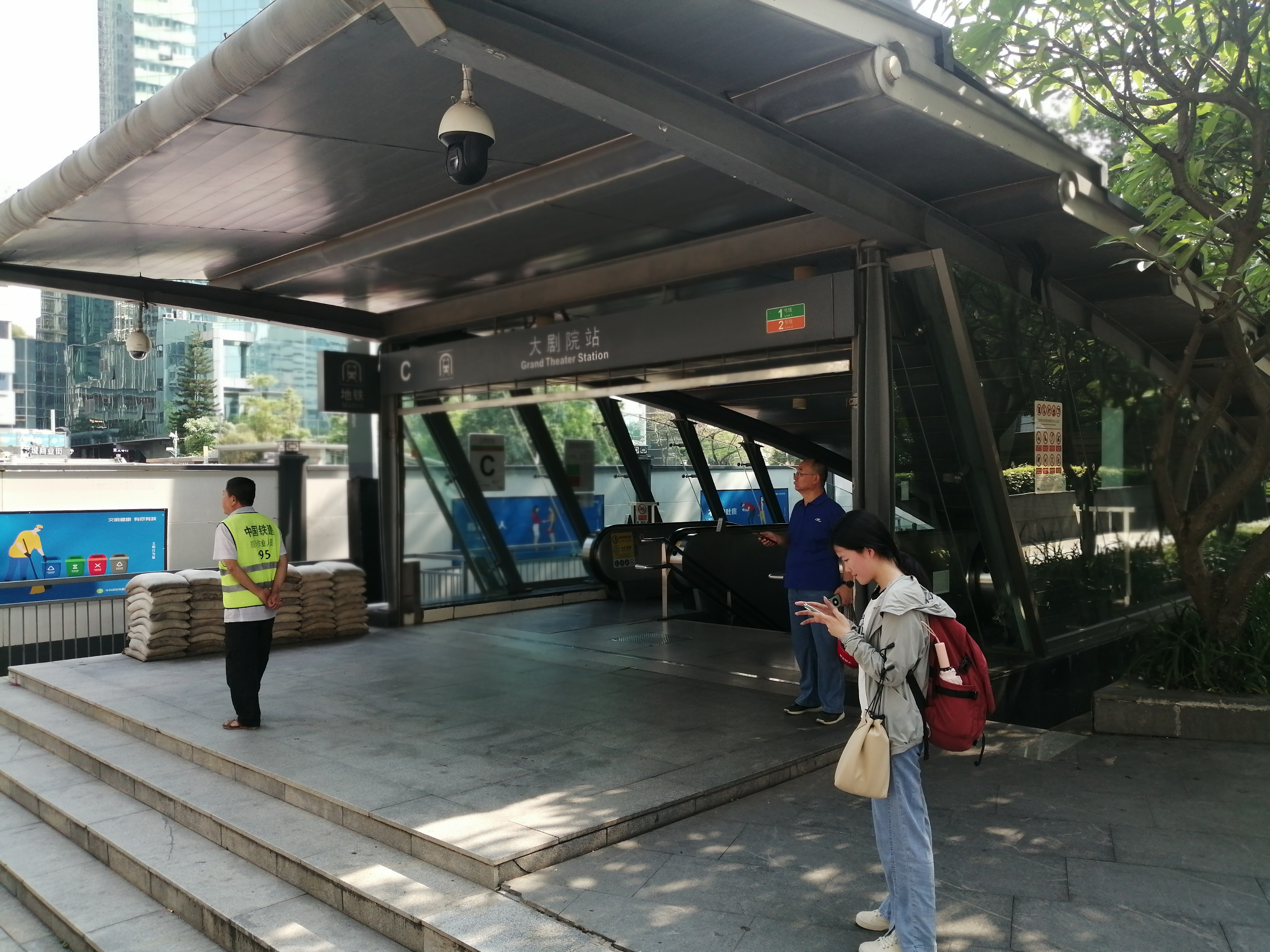
Entrance C

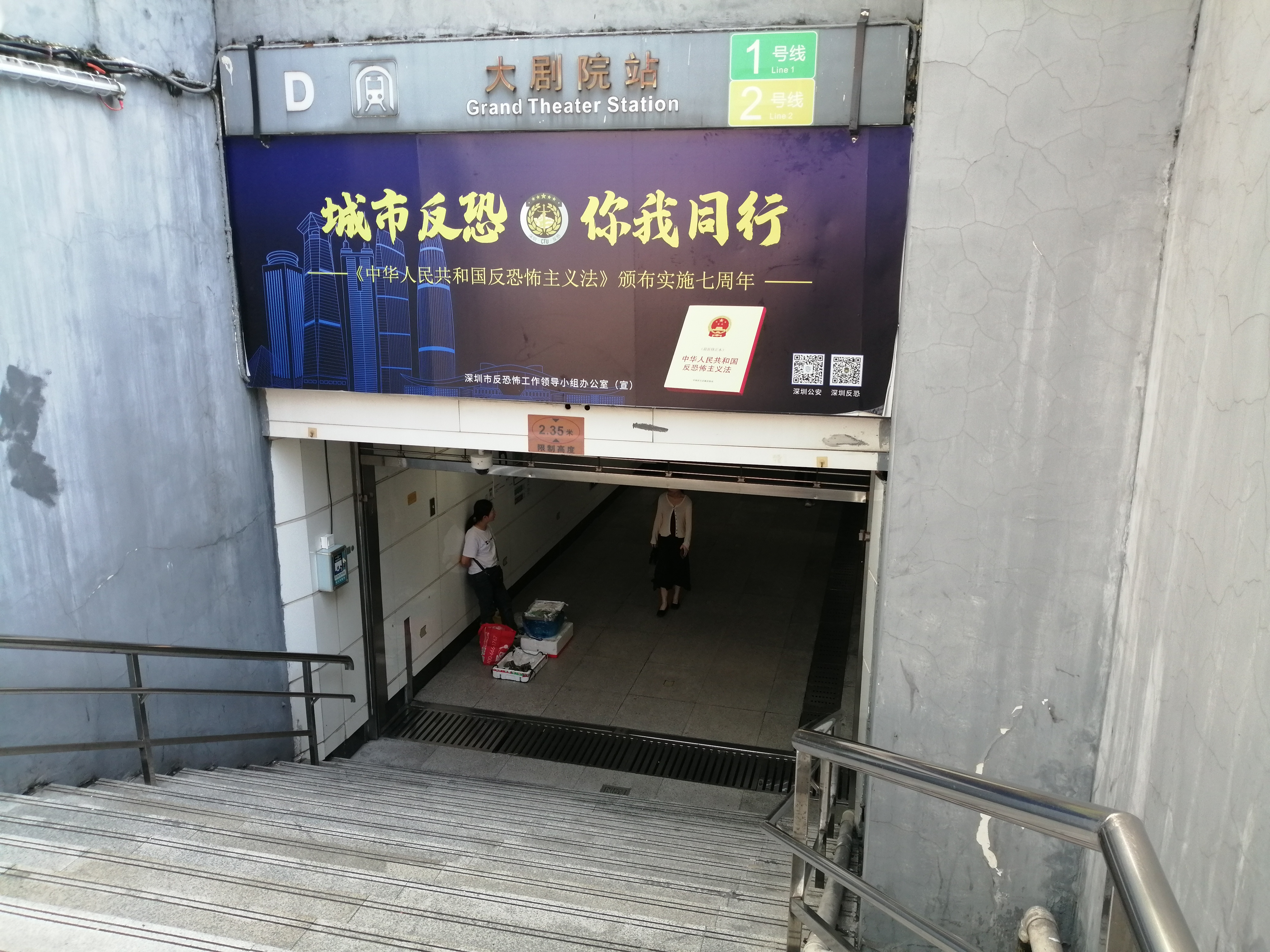
Entrance D

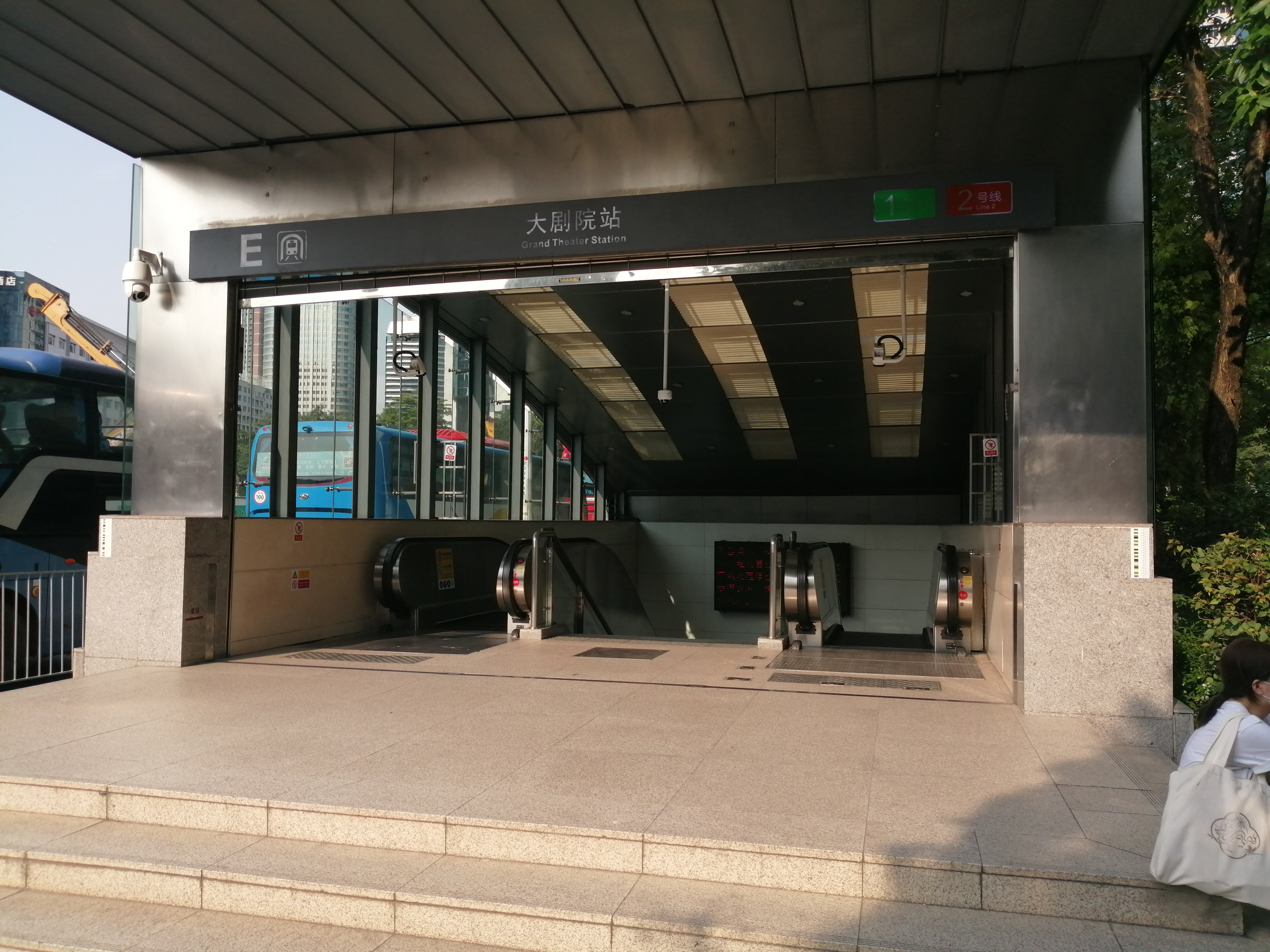
Entrance E

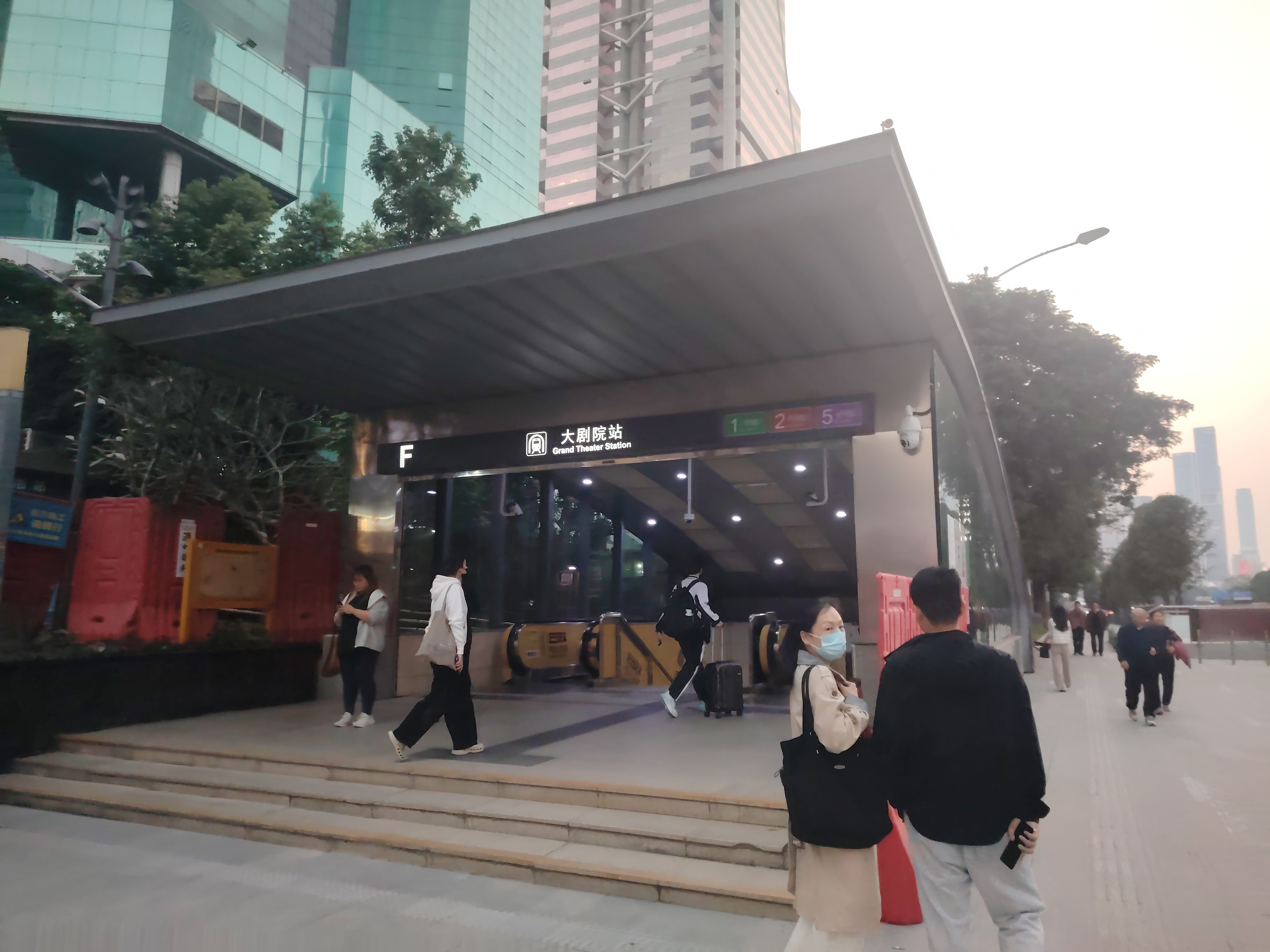
Entrance F

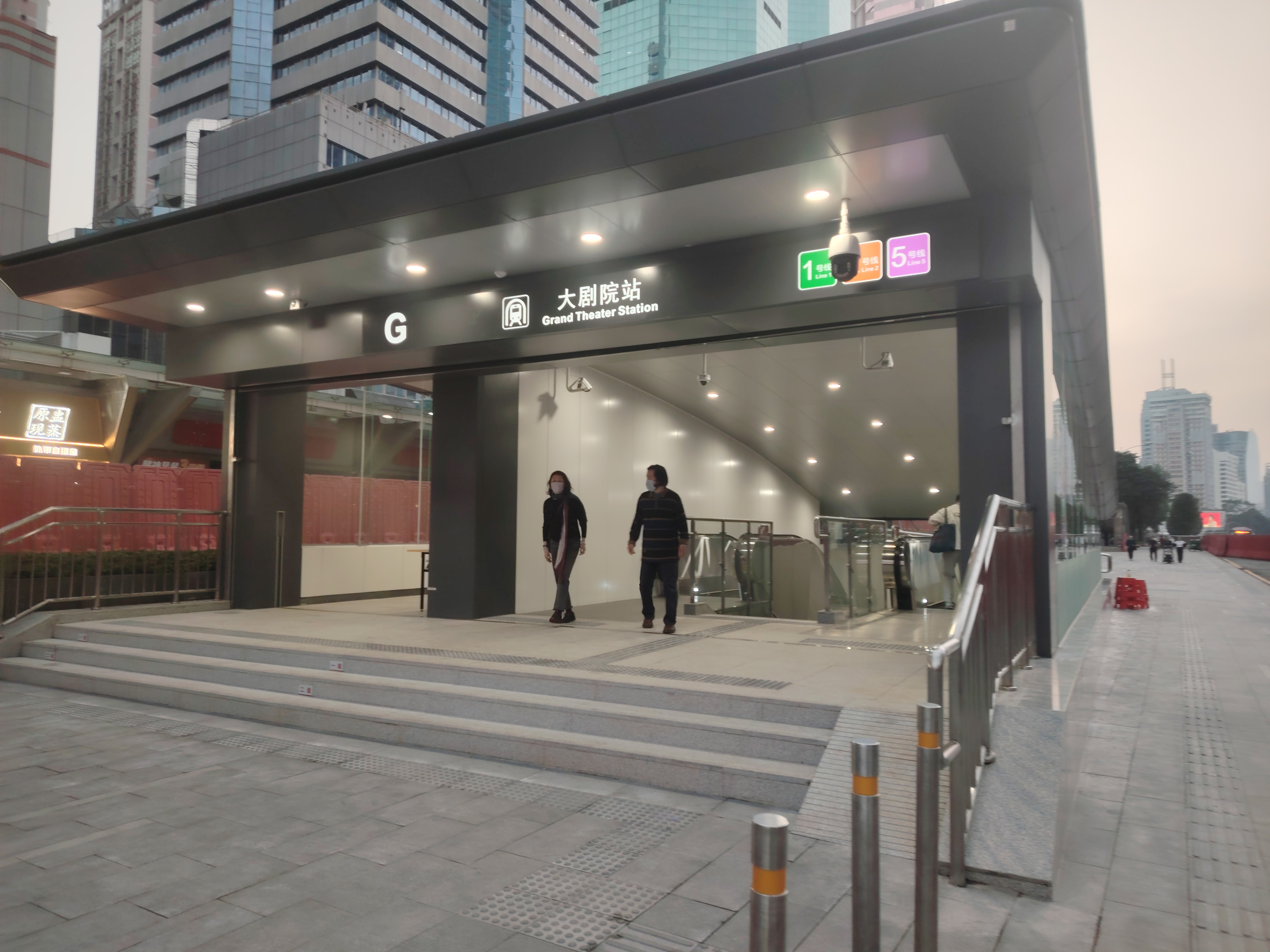
Entrance G
