= Guomao station (Shenzhen Metro) =

Metro station in Shenzhen, Guangdong, China

Coordinates: 22°32′24″N 114°7′8″E

Guomao 国贸
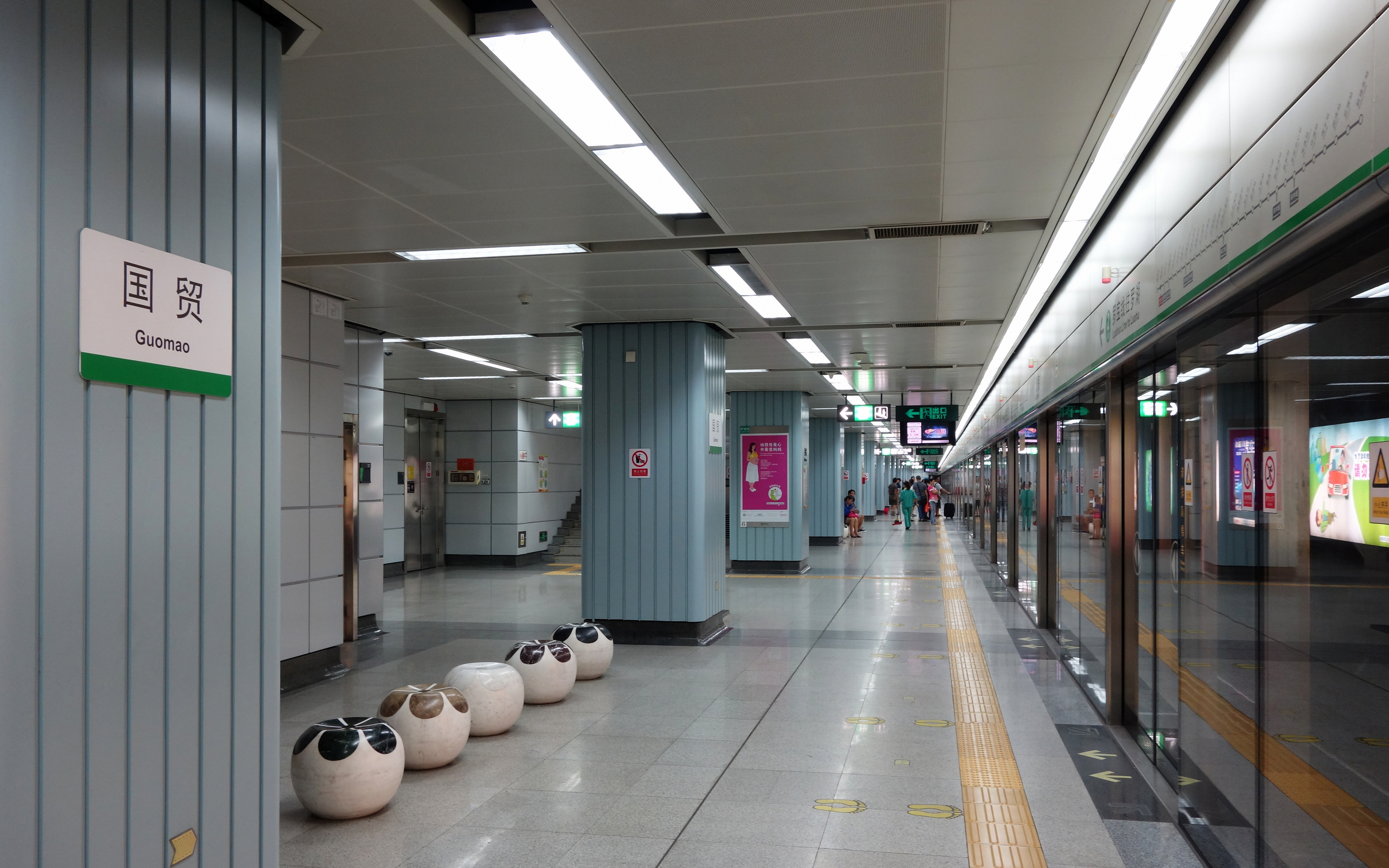

Chinese name
- Traditional Chinese: 國貿
- Simplified Chinese: 国贸
- Literal meaning: International Trade Centre
Transcriptions
Standard Mandarin
- Hanyu Pinyin: Guómào

General information
- Location: Luohu District, Shenzhen, Guangdong; China
- Operator: SZMC (Shenzhen Metro Group)
- Line: Line 1
- Platforms: 2 (2 split side platform)
- Tracks: 2

Construction
- Structure type: Underground
- Platform levels: 2
- Accessible: Yes

Other information
- Station code: 129

History
- Opened: 28 December 2004; 21 years ago

Services
Preceding station	Shenzhen Metro	Following station
Laojie towards Airport East	Line 1	Luohu Terminus
Route map
Location

Guomao station (simplified Chinese: 国贸站; traditional Chinese: 國貿站; pinyin: Guómào Zhàn; lit. 'International Trade Centre station'; Cantonese Jyutping: Gwok3 Mau6 Zaam6) is a station on Line 1 of the Shenzhen Metro. It opened on 28 December 2004. It is located underneath the junction of Renmin South Road (人民南路) and Jiabin Road (嘉宾路; 嘉賓路) in Luohu District, Shenzhen, China. It is named after the Guomao Building (International Trade Centre Building) (国贸大厦; 國貿大廈). Along with the adjacent Laojie Station (where it is now used for cross-platform interchange), Guomao Station has an unusual layout with the two tracks situated above each other on two levels.

== Station layout ==
G	-	Exit
B1F; Concourse	Lobby	Customer Service, Shops, Vending machines, ATMs
B2F; Upper Platforms	Side platform, doors will open on the right
B2F; Upper Platforms	Platform 1	← Line 1 towards Airport East (Laojie)
B3F; Lower Platforms	Side platform, doors will open on the left
B3F; Lower Platforms	Platform 2	→ Line 1 towards Luohu (Terminus) →

== Exits ==
Exit	Destination
Exit A	Renmin South Road (E), Jiabin Road (S), Kingglory Plaza, Kerry Centre, Luohu Hospital, Nanhu Primary School, Nanhu Police Station
Exit B	Shennan East Road, Renmin South Road (E), Shenhua Building, Crowne Plaza Landmark Hotel
Exit C	Renmin South Road (E), Guomao Building (International Trade Centre Building), Dongmen Pedestrian Street
Exit D	Renmin South Road (W)
Exit E	Renmin South Road (W), Jiabin Road (S), Luohu Primary School, Jianshe Road, Yingchun Road
