= Laojie station =

Metro station in Shenzhen, Guangdong, China

Laojie 老街
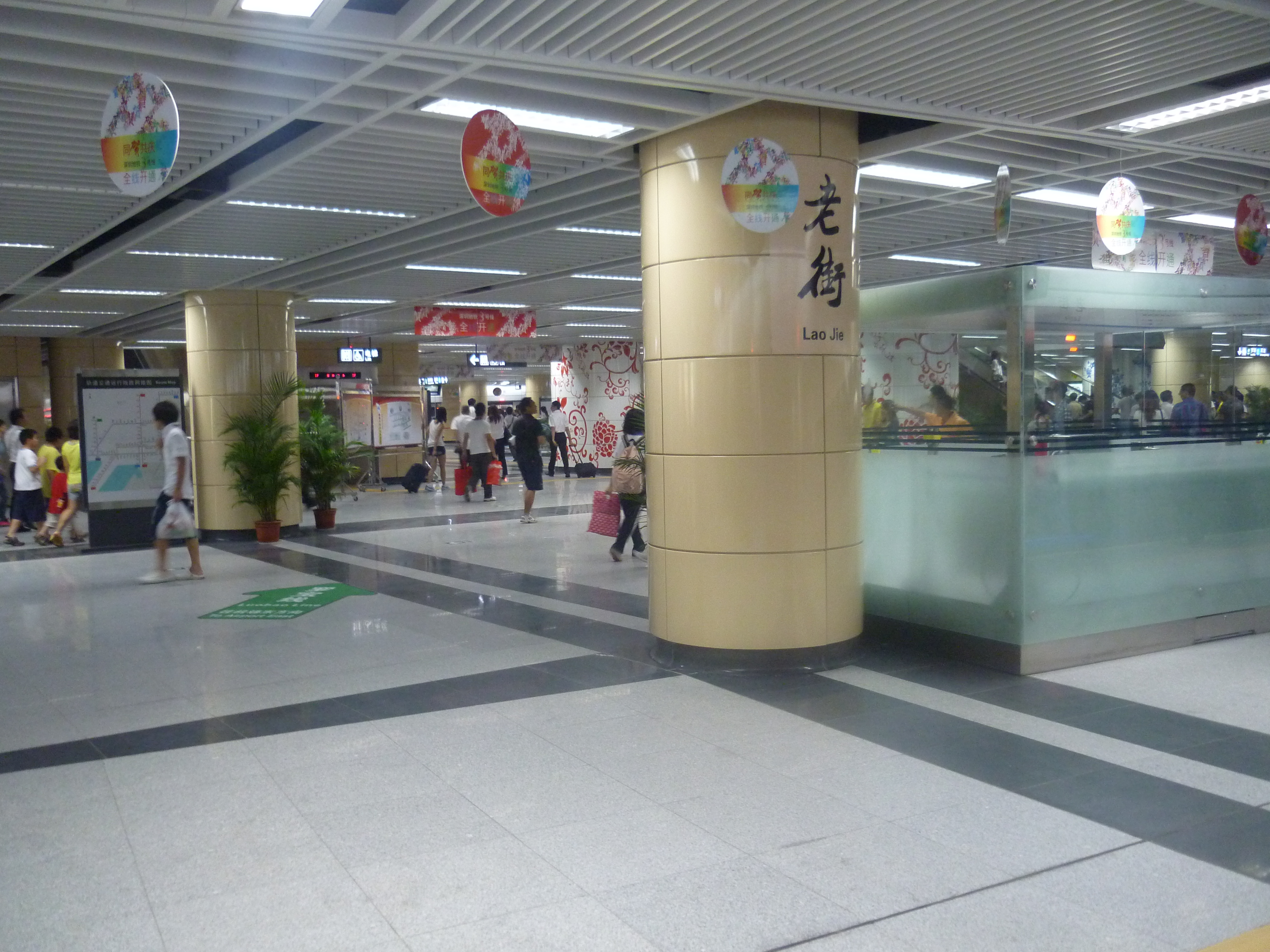
- Eastbound platform level

Chinese name
- Traditional Chinese: 老街
- Simplified Chinese: 老街
- Literal meaning: Old Street
Transcriptions
Standard Mandarin
- Hanyu Pinyin: Lǎojiē zhàn
Yue: Cantonese
- Jyutping: Lou5 Gaai1 Zaam6

General information
- Location: Luohu District, Shenzhen, Guangdong; China
- Coordinates: 22°32′40″N 114°6′59″E
- Operator: SZMC (Shenzhen Metro Group)
- Lines: Line 1; Line 3
- Platforms: 6 (2 island platforms and 2 side platforms, side platforms only for emergency use)
- Tracks: 4

Construction
- Structure type: Underground
- Platform levels: 2
- Accessible: Yes

History
- Opened: Line 1: 28 December 2004 (21 years ago); Line 3: 28 June 2011 (15 years ago)

Passengers
- 2015: 104,871 daily
- Rank: 1st of 118

Services
Preceding station	Shenzhen Metro	Following station
Grand Theater towards Airport East	Line 1	Guomao towards Luohu
Shaibu towards Pingdi Liulian	Line 3	Hongling towards Futian Bonded Area
Track layout
Location

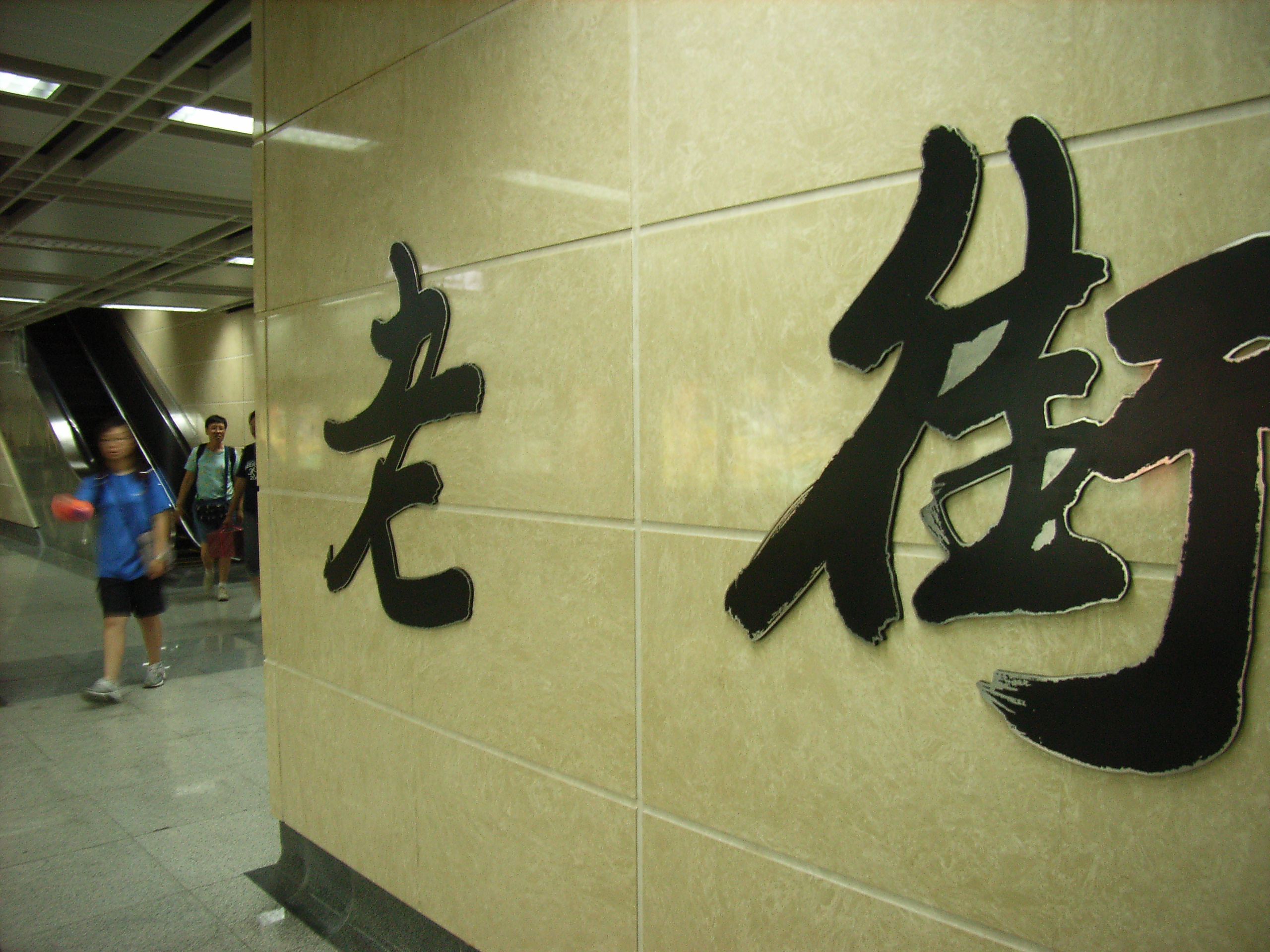
Calligraphy of the Chinese characters for Laojie on the station platform

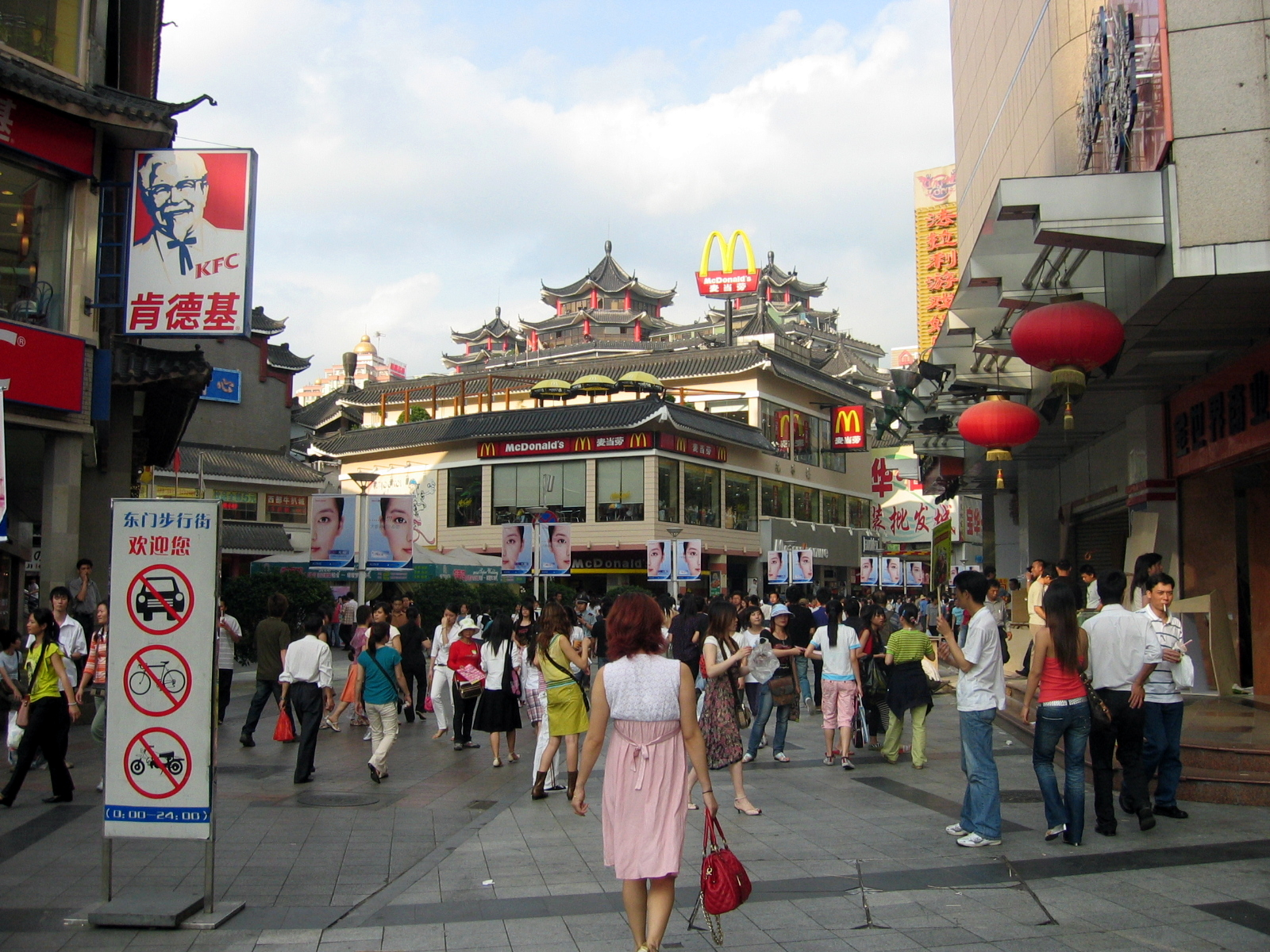
The neighbouring Dongmen Commercial Street

Laojie station (Chinese: 老街站; pinyin: Lǎojiē zhàn; Jyutping: Lou5 Gaai1 Zaam6; lit. 'Old Street station') is a station on the Shenzhen Metro. It provides cross-platform interchange between Line 1 and Line 3. The station is the busiest on the network with 61,600 passenger entries and exits a day. The Line 1 platforms opened on 28 December 2004 and the Line 3 platforms opened on 28 June 2011. It is located underneath the junction of Shennan Fudao (simplified Chinese: 深南辅道; traditional Chinese: 深南輔道), Jiefang Road (解放路) and Jianshe Road (建设路; 建設路) in the Luohu District of Shenzhen, China. The station is the closest to the Dongmen Business Area (东门商业区; 東門商業區), one of the oldest areas in Shenzhen established in the Ming dynasty.

== Station layout ==
G	-	Exit
B1F	-	Exit
B2F; Concourse	Lobby	Customer Service, Shops, Vending machines, ATMs
B3F; Platforms	Platform	3 towards Futian Bonded Area (Hongling)
B3F; Platforms	Island platform, doors will open on the left for 3 / right for 1
B3F; Platforms	Platform	1 towards Airport East (Grand Theater)
B3F; Platforms	Side platform, not in service
B4F; Platforms	Platform	3 towards Pingdi Liulian (Shaibu)
B4F; Platforms	Island platform, doors will open on the right for 3 / left for 1
B4F; Platforms	Platform	1 towards Luohu (Guomao)
B4F; Platforms	Side platform, not in service

== Exits ==
Exit	Destination
Exit A	Jiefang Road, Renmin North Road, Dongmen, Shenzhen Guest Hotel, Shenzhen Theatre, Shenzhen Worker's Cultural Palace, Lilian Sun Plaza, MOI Department Store, Nantang Commercial Mall
Exit B	Jianshe Road (E), Heping Road, Shenzhen Power Supply Bureau of Guangdong Power Grid Corporation, First Outpatient Department of Shenzhen People's Hospital, Post Office Building, Honglong Century Plaza
Exit C	Shennan East Road (N), China Telecom (Telecom Building)
Exit D	Dongmen, 1234 Space, Yongxin Street
Exit E	Lilian Sun Plaza, Gold World Department Store, 1234 Space, Jintai Metro Mall, Renmin Road (N)
Exit F	Shenzhen Cinemas, Xingyuan Road, Shenzhen Guest Hotel, Erheng Street (E), Erheng Street (W)
Exit G	Renmin Road (N), People's Park, Workers Cultural Palace
Exit H	Jiefang Road (N), 1234 Space, Renmin Gongyuan Road (N)

== See also ==
- Dongmen
- Chegongmiao station
- Hongshuwan South station
- Admiralty station (MTR)
