= Dongmen, Shenzhen =

Commercial area in Luohu District, Shenzhen, China

Coordinates: 22°32′52″N 114°06′56″E

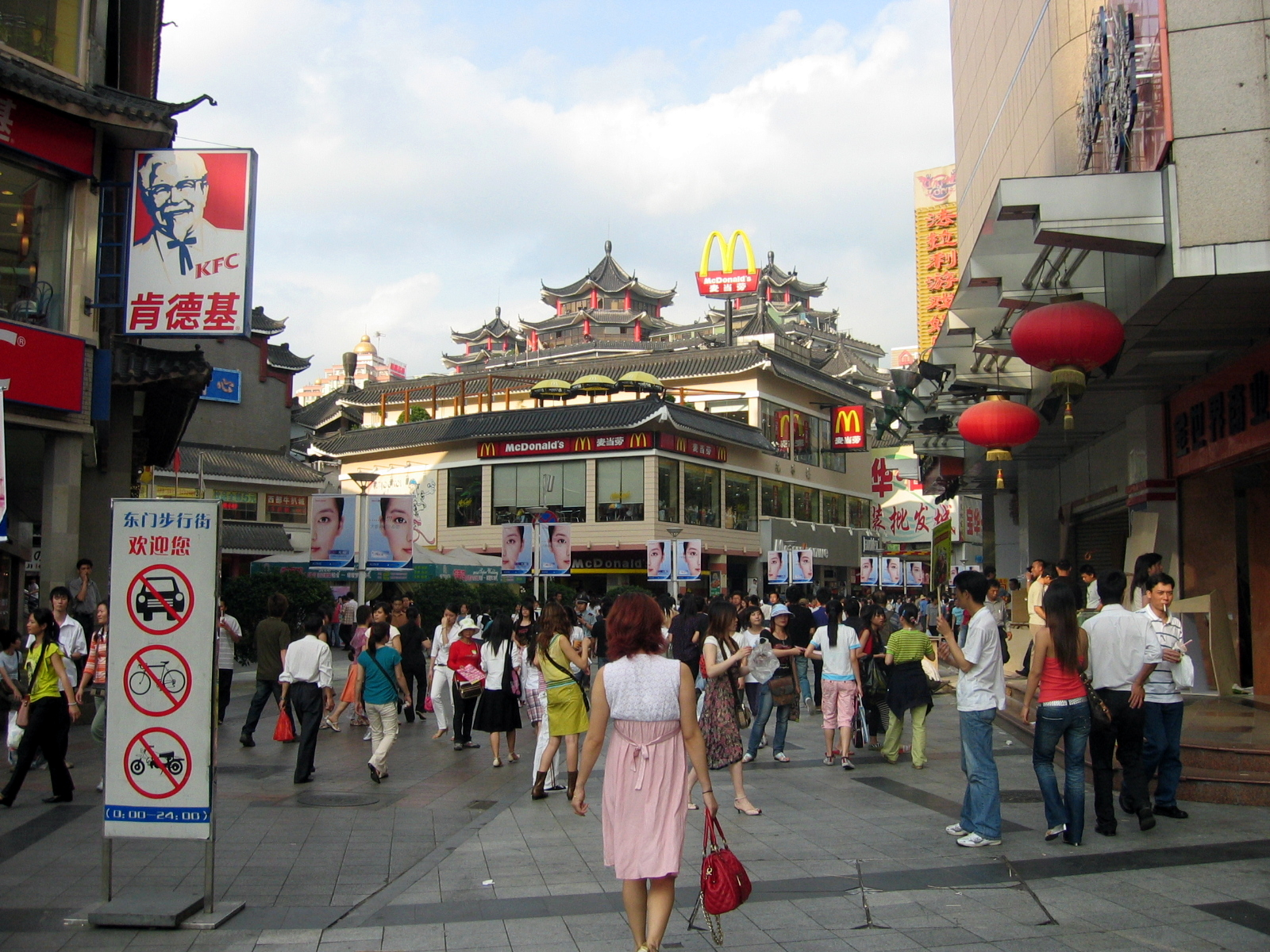
Dongmen Pedestrian Street

Dongmen (simplified Chinese: 东门; traditional Chinese: 東門; pinyin: Dōngmén; Jyutping: dung1 mun4; lit. "East Gate") is a subdistrict within Luohu District of Shenzhen, in China. It is a shopping district located on Dongmen Pedestrian Street (东门步行街; 東門步行街; Dōngmén Bùxíngjiē; dung1 mun4 bou6 hang4 gaai1).

== Name ==
As one of the older parts of Shenzhen, the Dongmen area was established about 300 years ago as the centre of the Shenzhen Market (深圳墟), the town which would later lend its name to the city. This leads it to be alternatively known as "Laojie" (lit. "Old Street").

== Location ==
Lying just north of Shennan East Road, Dongmen is accessible from Exit A of Laojie Station, Shenzhen Metro. "Dongmen" usually refers to more than just "Dongmen Road", encompassing the entire series of connecting commercial streets. These streets were pedestrianised in 1999.

== History ==
The first McDonald's in Mainland China opened in Dongmen in October 1990. There are brass plaques in front of the restaurant commemorating this and a number of other "firsts," such as the first touch screen for ordering.
