= Houting station =

Houting station can refer to the following stations:

- Houting station (Fuzhou Metro), a station on Line 2 (Fuzhou Metro)
- Houting station (Shenzhen Metro), a station on Line 11 (Shenzhen Metro)
