= Tangwei station =

Metro station in Shenzhen, China

Tangwei 塘尾
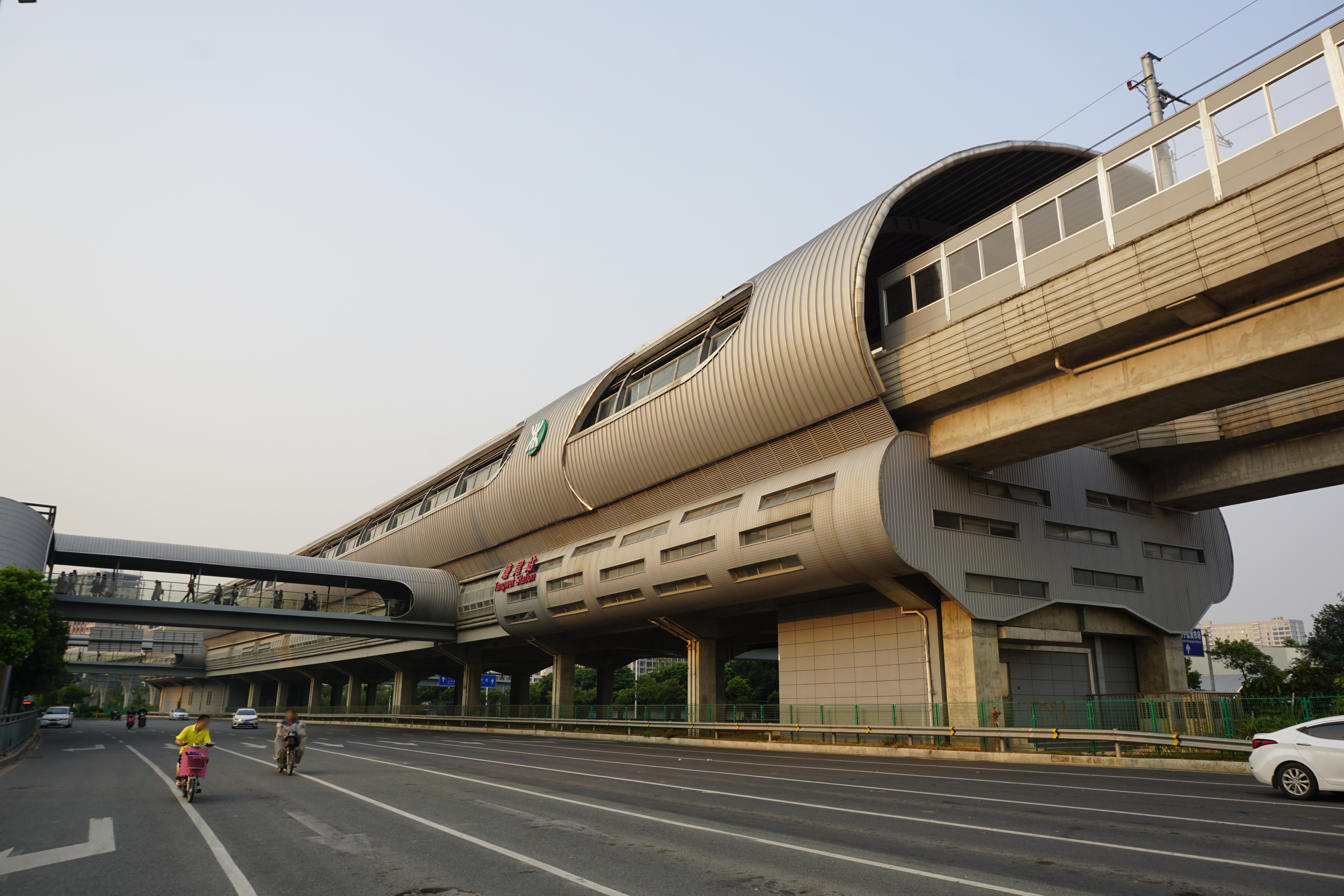
- Exterior

General information
- Location: Bao'an District, Shenzhen, Guangdong; China
- Coordinates: 22°42′28″N 113°49′28″E
- Operated by: SZMC (Shenzhen Metro Group)
- Line: Line 11
- Platforms: 2 (1 island platform)
- Tracks: 2

Construction
- Structure type: Elevated
- Accessible: Yes

History
- Opened: 28 June 2016 (10 years ago)

Services
Preceding station	Shenzhen Metro	Following station
Ma'anshan towards Bitou	Line 11	Qiaotou towards Hongling South
Location

Tangwei station (Chinese: 塘尾站; pinyin: Tángwěi Zhàn) is a station on Line 11 of the Shenzhen Metro in China. It opened on 28 June 2016.

== Station layout ==
3F; Platforms	Platform	11 towards Bitou (Ma'anshan)
3F; Platforms	Island platform, doors will open on the left
3F; Platforms	Platform	11 towards Hongling South (Qiaotou)
2F; Concourse	Lobby	Ticket Machines, Customer Service, Shops, Vending Machines
G	-	Exits A-D

== Exits ==
Exit	Image	Destination
Exit A		Bao'an Boulevard (W)
Exit B		Bao'an Boulevard (W), Fengtang Boulevard
Exit C	Under reconstruction	Bao'an Boulevard (E), Fengtang Boulevard
Exit D		Bao'an Boulevard (E)
