= Fuxing station (Shenzhen Metro) =

Shenzhen Metro Line 11 station

Fuxing 福星
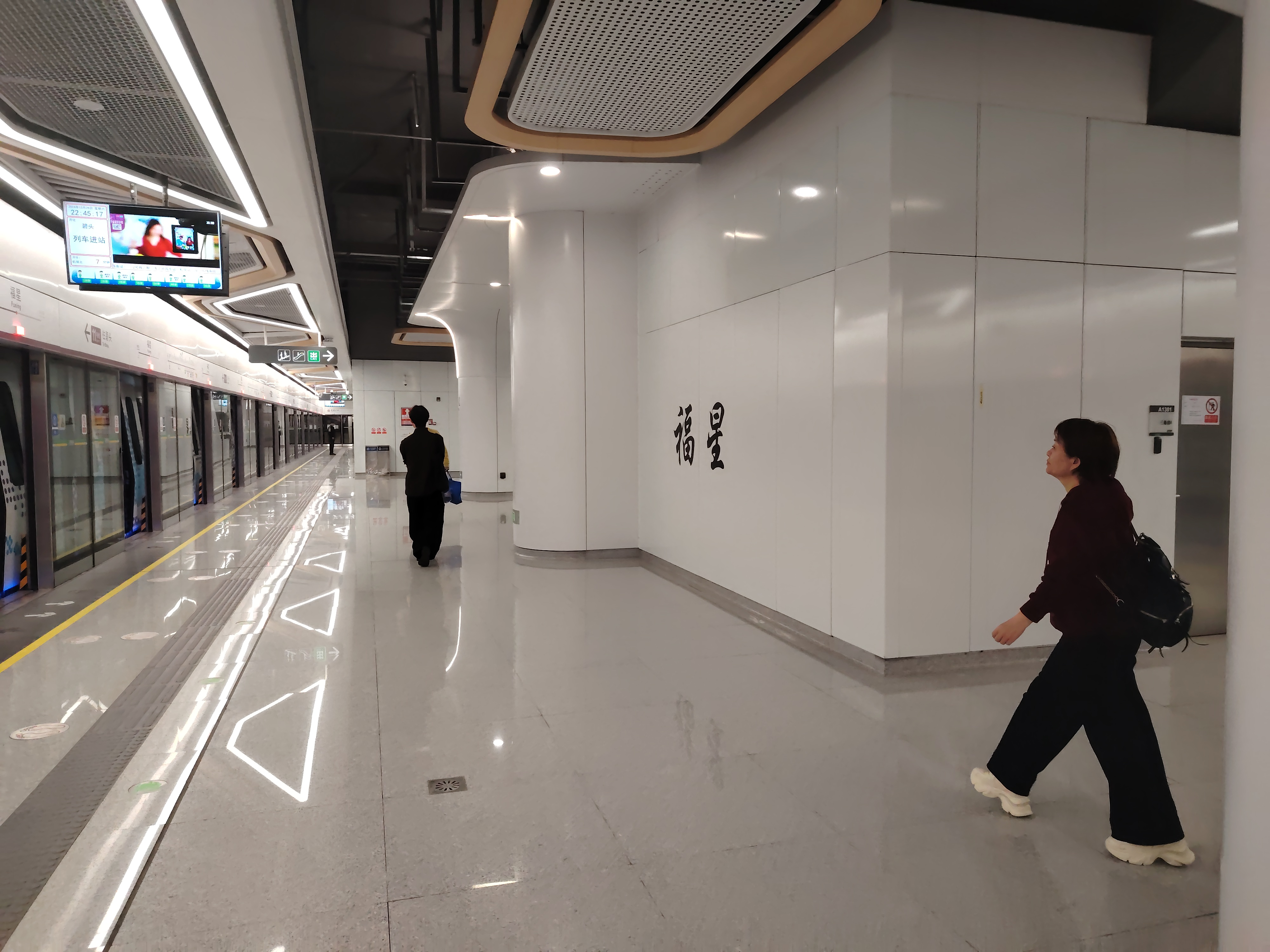
- Platform

Chinese name
- Chinese: 福星
Transcriptions
Standard Mandarin
- Hanyu Pinyin: Fúxīng
Yue: Cantonese
- Jyutping: Fuk1 Sing1

General information
- Location: Fuhua Road (福华路), between Fuming Road (福明路) and Fuxing Road (福星路); Futian District, Shenzhen, Guangdong; China
- Coordinates: 22°32′25″N 114°04′35″E
- Operated by: SZMC (Shenzhen Metro Group)
- Line: Line 11
- Platforms: 2 (1 island platform)
- Tracks: 2

Construction
- Structure type: Underground
- Accessible: Yes

History
- Opened: 28 December 2024 (16 months ago)
- Previous names: The Eighth Affiliated Hospital of SYSU (中大八院)

Services
Preceding station	Shenzhen Metro	Following station
Gangxia North towards Bitou	Line 11	Huaqiang South towards Hongling South
Location

Fuxing station (Chinese: 福星; pinyin: Fúxīng Zhàn; Jyutping: Fuk1 Sing1 Zaam6), planning name The Eighth Affiliated Hospital of SYSU (中大八院), is a station on Line 11 of Shenzhen Metro. It opened on 28 December 2024, and is located in Futian District. The station is part of the second phase of Line 11, which commenced construction in August 2020.

== Station layout ==
G	-	Exits A, C, D
B1F; Concourse	Lobby	Ticket Machines, Customer Service, Vending Machines
B2F	Equipment level	Fuxing Stabling Yard access tracks (no platforms)
B3F; Platforms	Platform	11 towards Bitou (Gangxia North)
B3F; Platforms	Island platform, doors will open on the left
B3F; Platforms	Platform	11 towards Hongling South (Huaqiang South)

=== Entrances/exits ===
The station has 3 points of entry/exit, with Exit A being accessible via elevator.

- A: Fuhua Road (N)
- C: Fuhua Road (S)
- D: Fuhua Road (N)
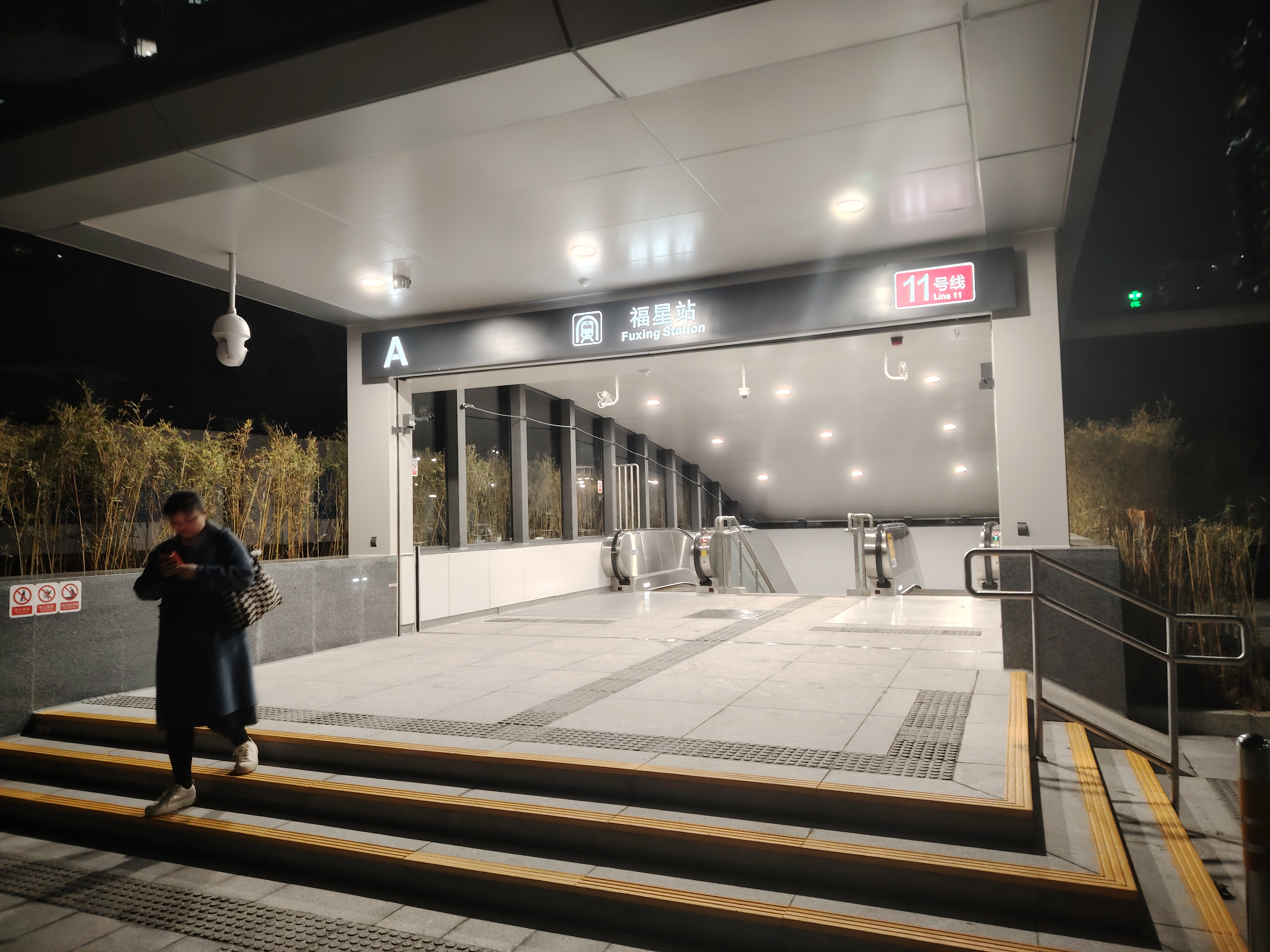
Entrance A

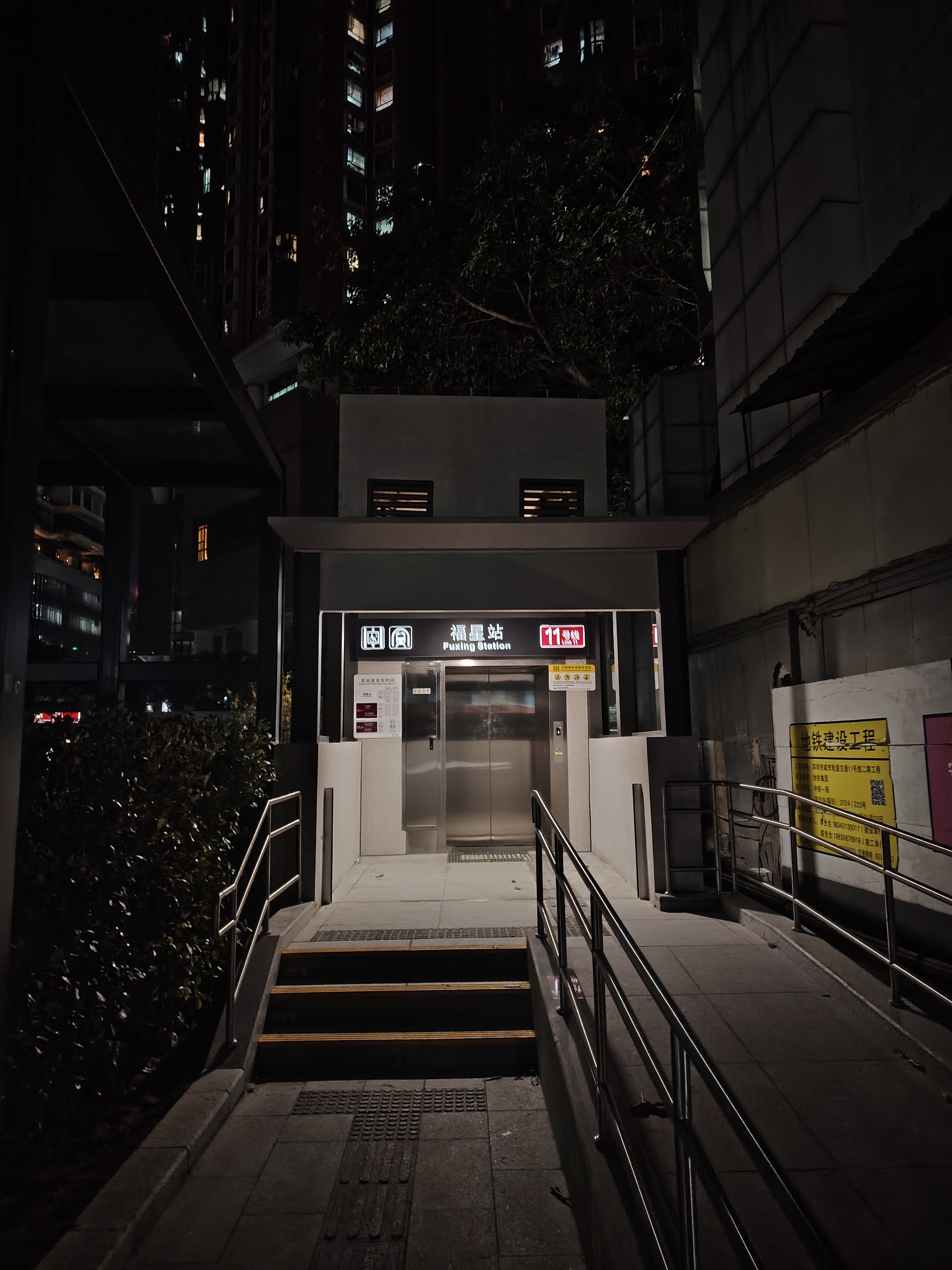
Entrance A (elevator entrance)

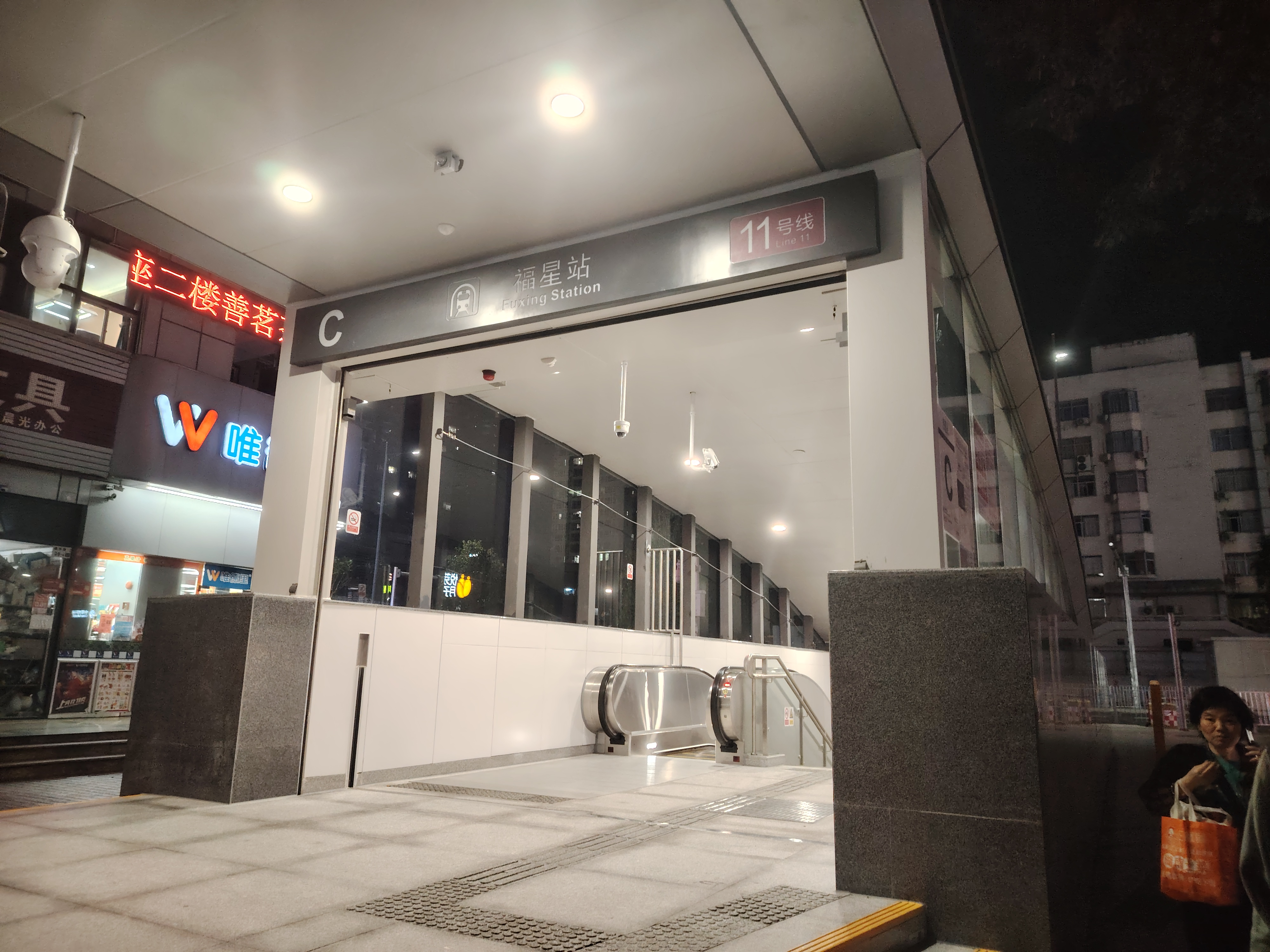
Entrance C

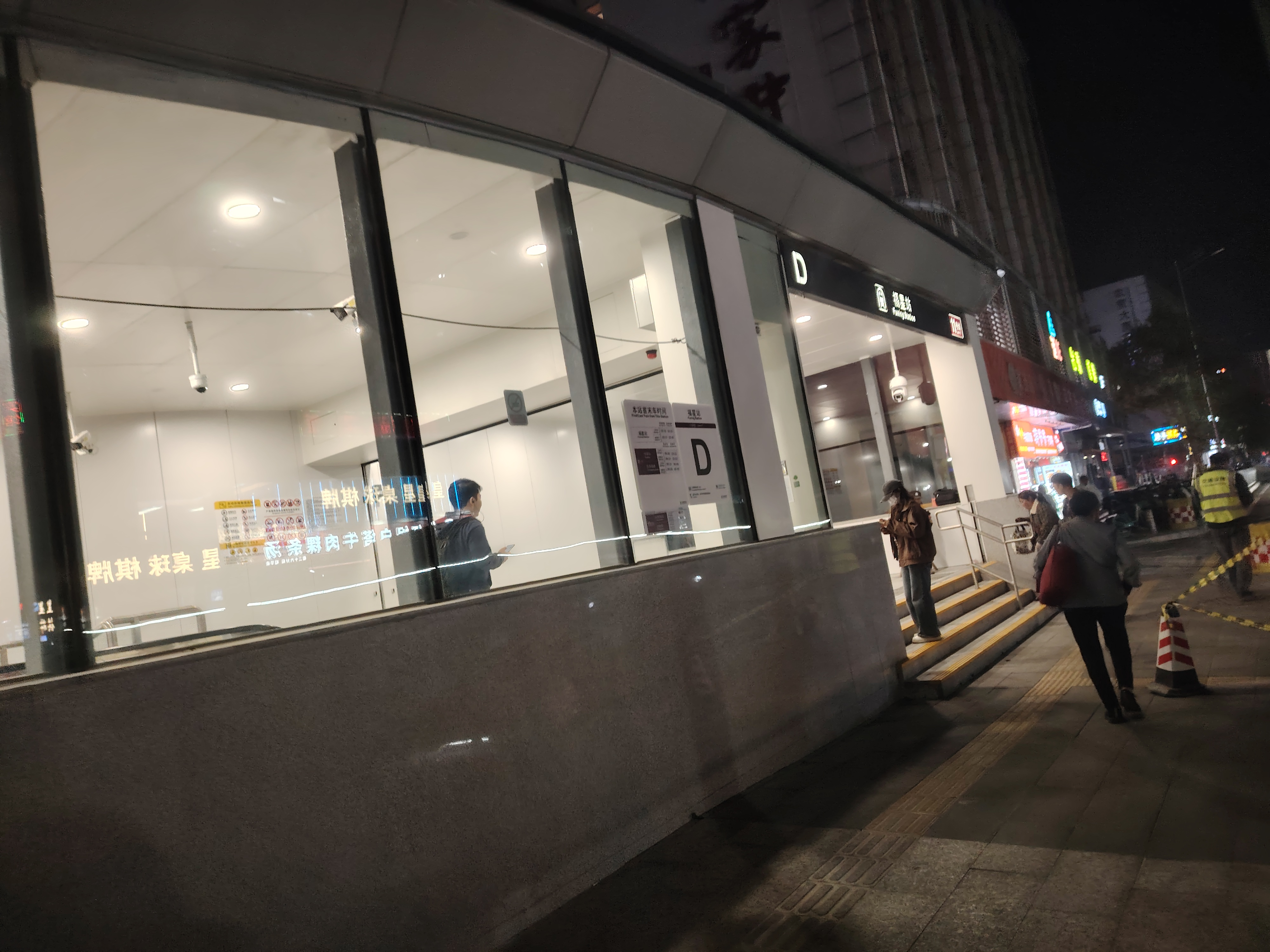
Entrance D

== History ==
The construction of the eastern extension of Shenzhen Metro Line 11 was approved by the National Development and Reform Commission (NDRC) in March 2020. In April of the same year, the Shenzhen Municipal Government decided to add The Eighth Affiliated Hospital of SYSU Station between Gangxia North Station and Huaqiang South Station on the grounds of "improving the service level of medical and livelihood facilities" and "solving the travel dilemma caused by excessive traffic created by the future development of CUHK Eighth Hospital and the area", and started construction in August 2020 at the same time as other parts of the second phase of the project. On October 14, 2024, the Shenzhen Municipal Bureau of Planning and Natural Resources announced that the official station name of the station is Fuxing Station.
