= Ma'anshan station =

Metro station in Shenzhen, China

Ma'anshan 马安山
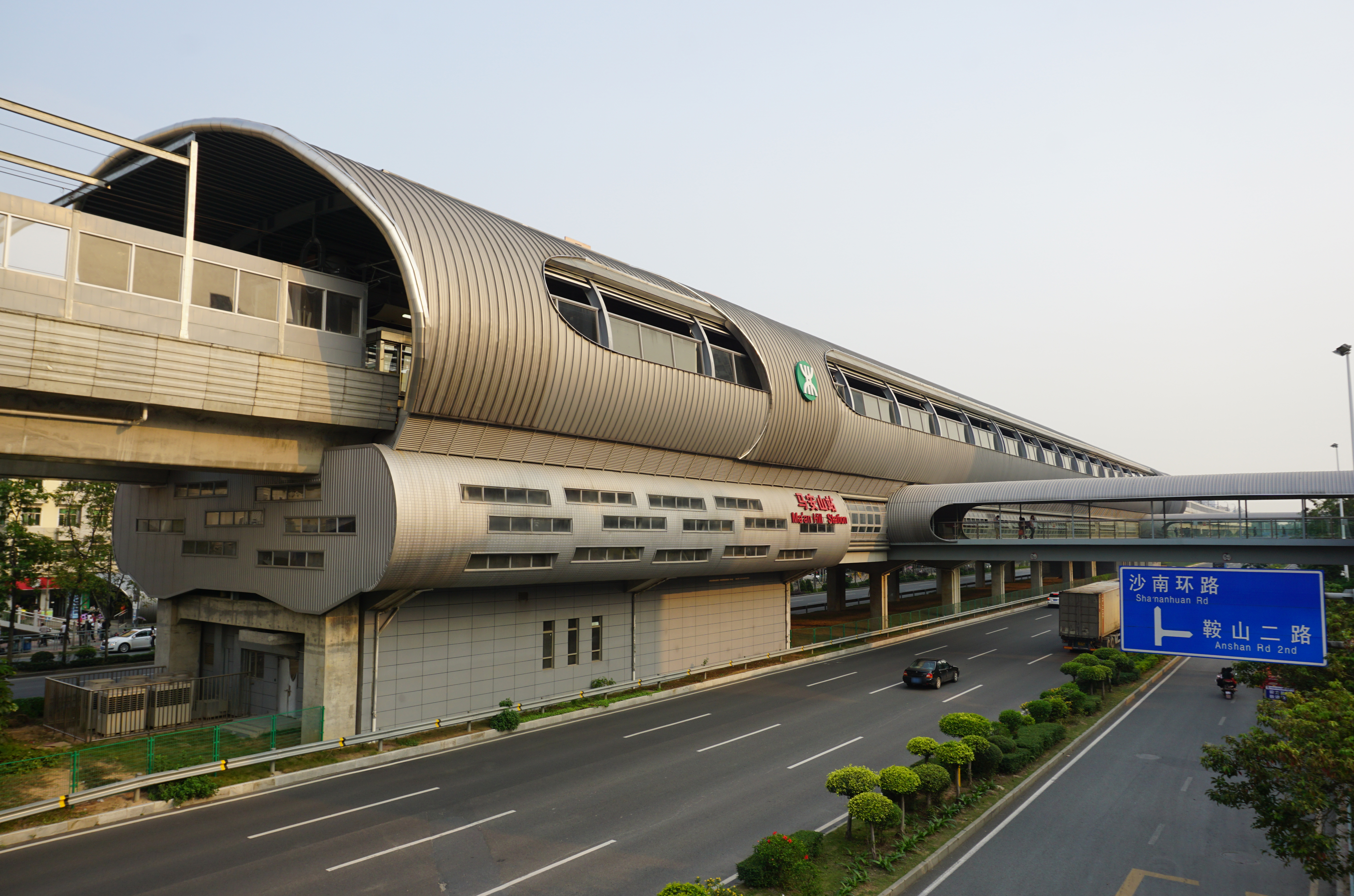
- Exterior

General information
- Location: Bao'an Boulevard (宝安大道); Bao'an District, Shenzhen, Guangdong; China
- Coordinates: 22°43′20″N 113°49′24″E
- Operated by: SZMC (Shenzhen Metro Group)
- Line: Line 11
- Platforms: 2 (1 island platform)
- Tracks: 2

Construction
- Structure type: Elevated
- Accessible: Yes

History
- Opened: 28 June 2016 (9 years ago)
- Previous names: Ma'an Hill

Services
Preceding station	Shenzhen Metro	Following station
Shajing towards Bitou	Line 11	Tangwei towards Hongling South
Location

Ma'anshan station (Chinese: 马安山站; pinyin: Mǎ'ān Shān Zhàn), formerly known as Ma'an Hill station, is a station on Line 11 of the Shenzhen Metro in China. It opened on 28 June 2016.

== Station layout ==
3F; Platforms	Platform	11 towards Bitou (Shajing)
3F; Platforms	Island platform, doors will open on the left
3F; Platforms	Platform	11 towards Hongling South (Tangwei)
2F; Concourse	Lobby	Ticket Machines, Customer Service, Shops, Vending Machines
G	-	Exits A-D

== Exits ==
- A: Bao'an Boulevard (W), Gangxia Road, Chongguang Road
- B: Bao'an Boulevard (W), Nanhuan Road
- C: Bao'an Boulevard (E), Nanhuan Road
- D: Bao'an Boulevard (E).
