= Fuyong station =

Shenzhen Metro Line 11 and Line 12 station

Fuyong 福永
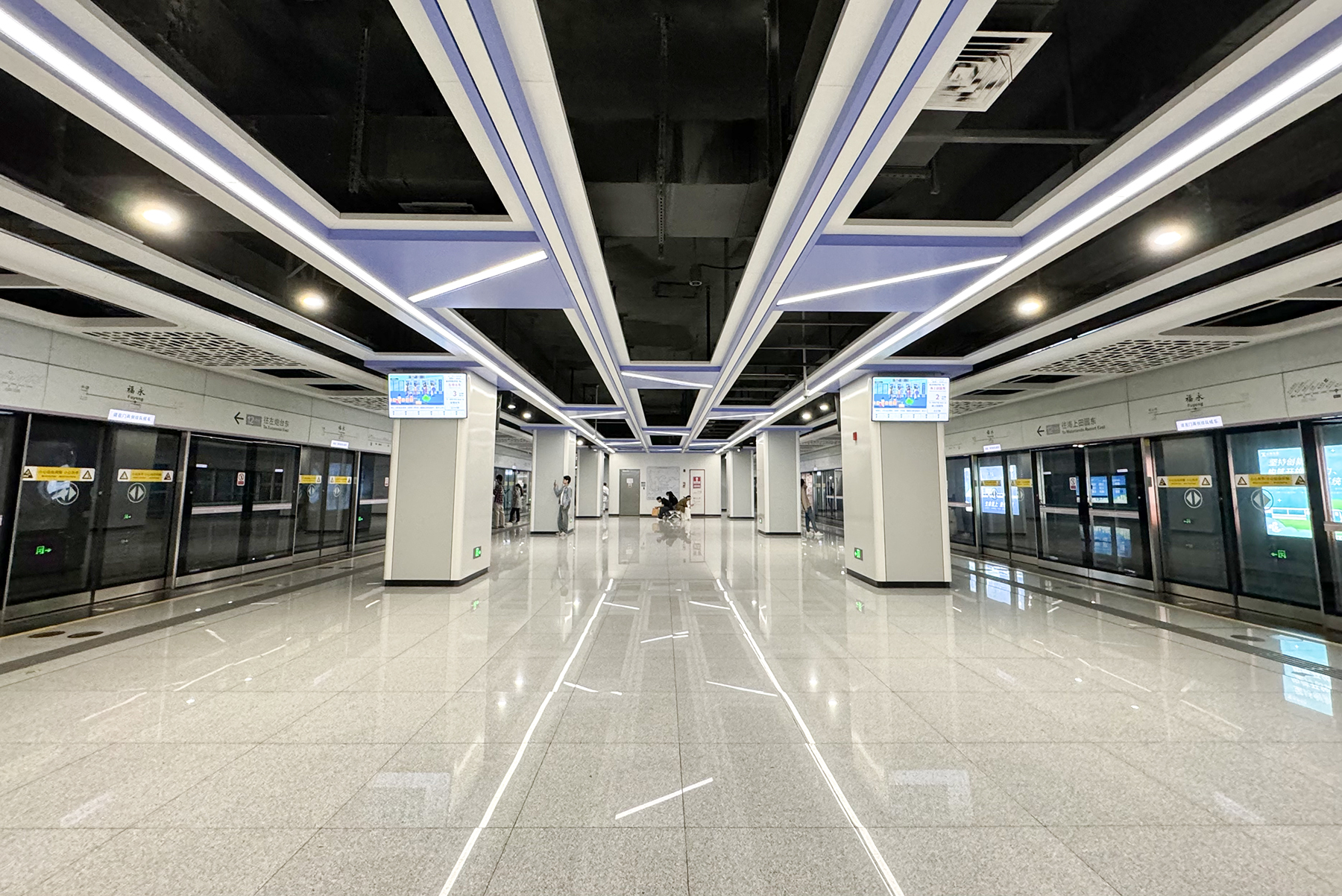
- Line 12 platform

Chinese name
- Chinese: 福永
Transcriptions
Standard Mandarin
- Hanyu Pinyin: Fúyǒng
Yue: Cantonese
- Yale Romanization: Fūkwíhng
- Jyutping: Fuk1 Wing2

General information
- Location: Intersection of Bao'an Avenue and Fuzhou Avenue; Fuyong Subdistrict, Bao'an district, Shenzhen, Guangdong; China
- Coordinates: 22°40′36.5″N 113°48′3.6″E
- Operated by: SZMC (Shenzhen Metro Group); Shenzhen Line 12 Rail Transit Co., Ltd (Shenzhen Metro Group and PowerChina PPP)
- Lines: Line 11; Line 12
- Platforms: 4 (2 island platforms)
- Tracks: 4

Construction
- Structure type: Underground
- Accessible: Yes

History
- Opened: Line 11: 28 June 2016 (9 years ago) (Line 11); Line 12: 28 November 2022 (3 years ago)

Services
Preceding station	Shenzhen Metro	Following station
Qiaotou towards Bitou	Line 11	Airport North towards Hongling South
Qiaotou West towards Songgang	Line 12	Huaide towards Zuopaotai East
Location

Fuyong station (Chinese: 福永站; Jyutping: Fuk1 Wing2 Zaam6; Cantonese Yale: Fūkwíhng Jaahm) is an interchange station for Line 11 and Line 12 of Shenzhen Metro in Guangdong Province. The station serves Fuyong Subdistrict.

== Station layout ==
G	-	Exits
B1F; Concourse	Lobby	Ticket machines, Customer Service, Station Control Room; Transfer passage between Line 11 and Line 12
B2F; 11 Platforms	Platform	11 towards Bitou (Qiaotou)
B2F; 11 Platforms	Island platform, doors will open on the left
B2F; 11 Platforms	Platform	11 towards Hongling South (Airport North)
B3F; 12 Platforms	Platform	12 towards Songgang (Qiaotou West)
B3F; 12 Platforms	Island platform, doors will open on the left
B3F; 12 Platforms	Platform	12 towards Zuopaotai East (Huaide)

== Exits ==
The Line 11 station has 4 points of entry/exit, with Exits B and C being accessible via elevators, and Exit C has a toilet. The Line 12 station has 2 points of entry/exit, with both exits being accessible via elevators, and Exit E has a toilet.

Exit	Destination
Exit A	Bao'an Avenue (W), Fuzhou Avenue (S)
Exit B	Bao'an Avenue (W)
Exit C	Bao'an Avenue (E)
Exit D	Bao'an Avenue (E), Fuzhou Avenue (S)
Exit E	Bao'an Avenue (E), Fuzhou Avenue (N)
Exit F	Bao'an Avenue (E), Fuzhou Avenue (S)

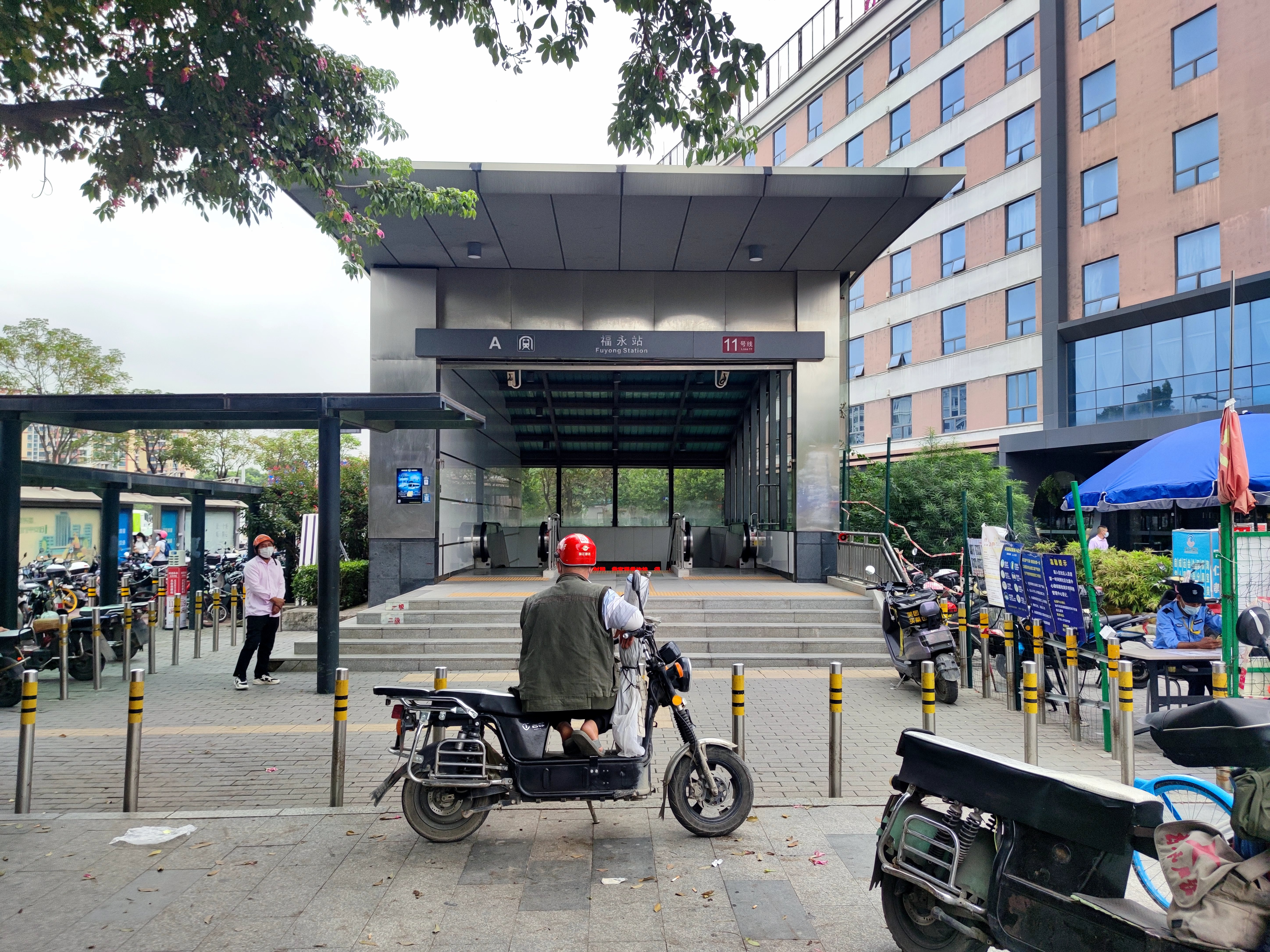
Entrance A

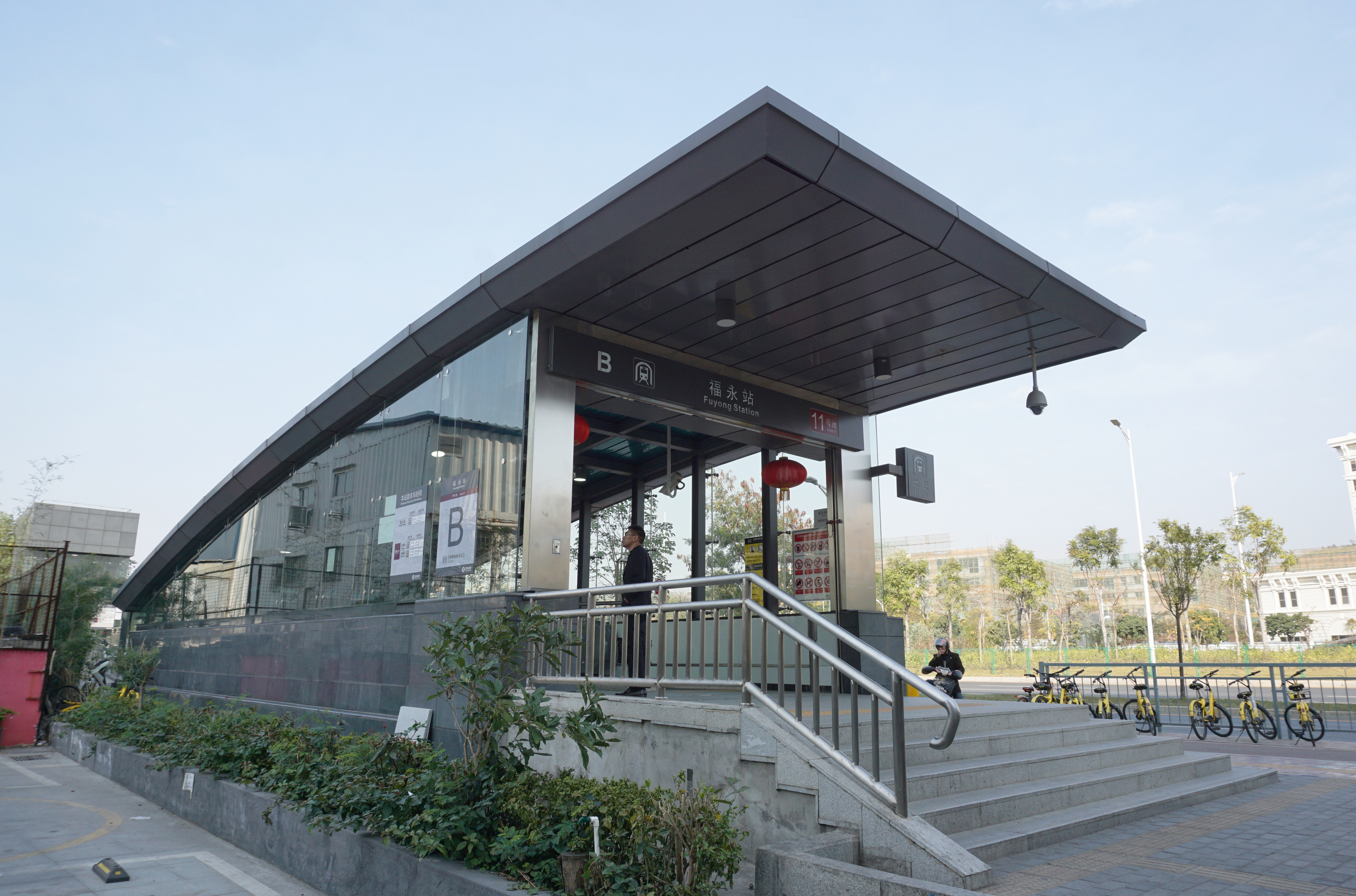
Entrance B

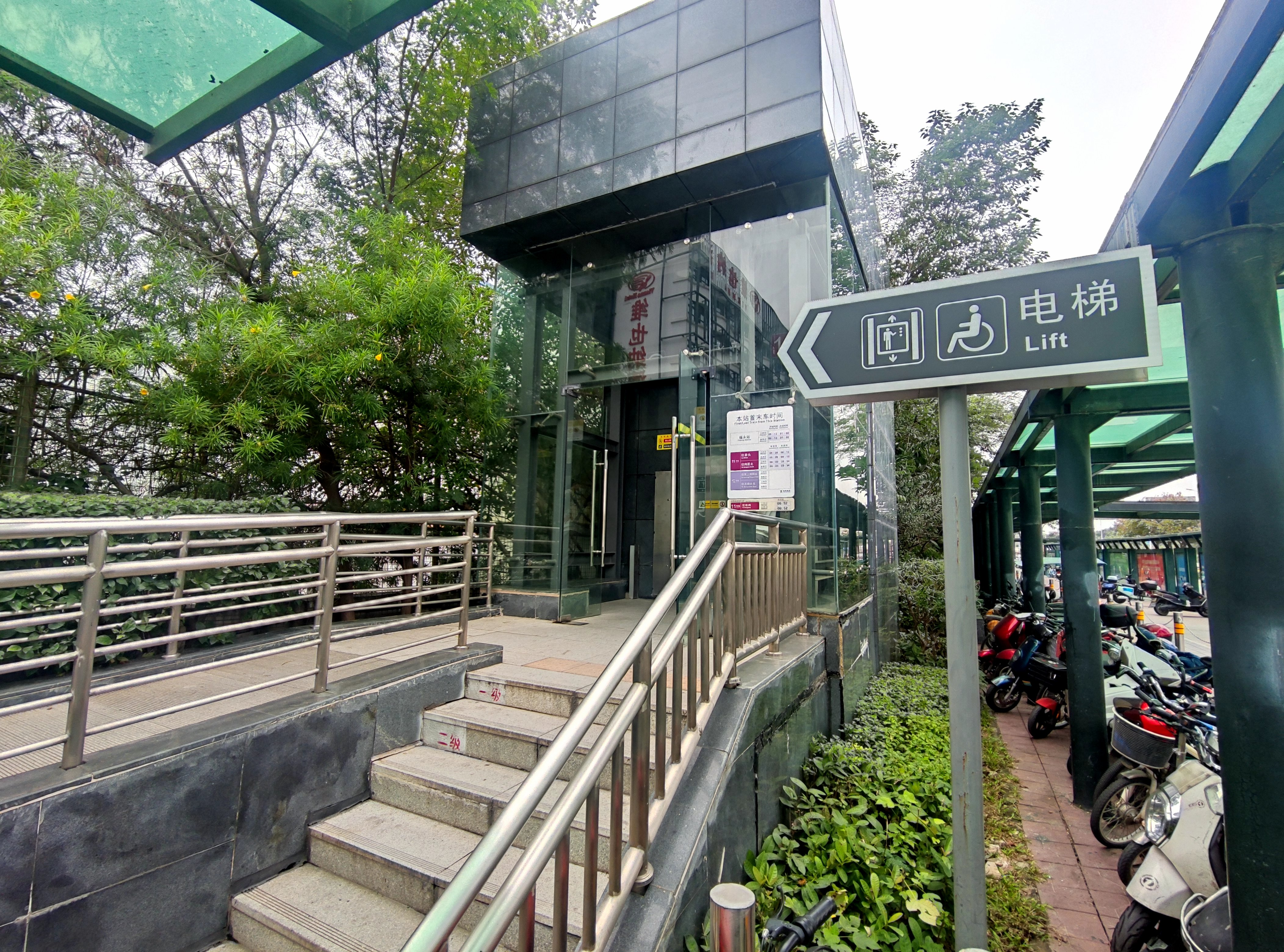
Entrance B (elevator entrance)

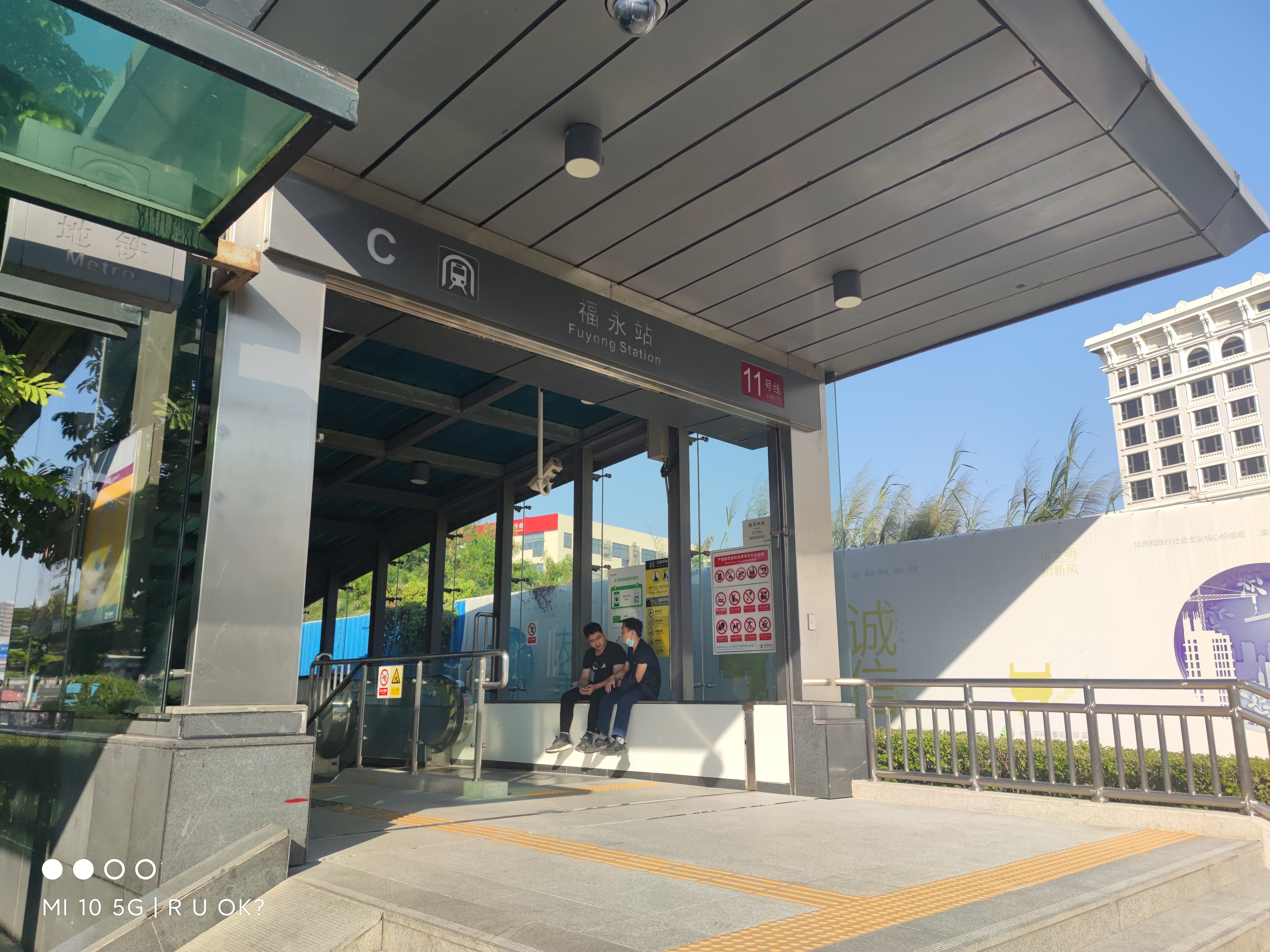
Entrance C

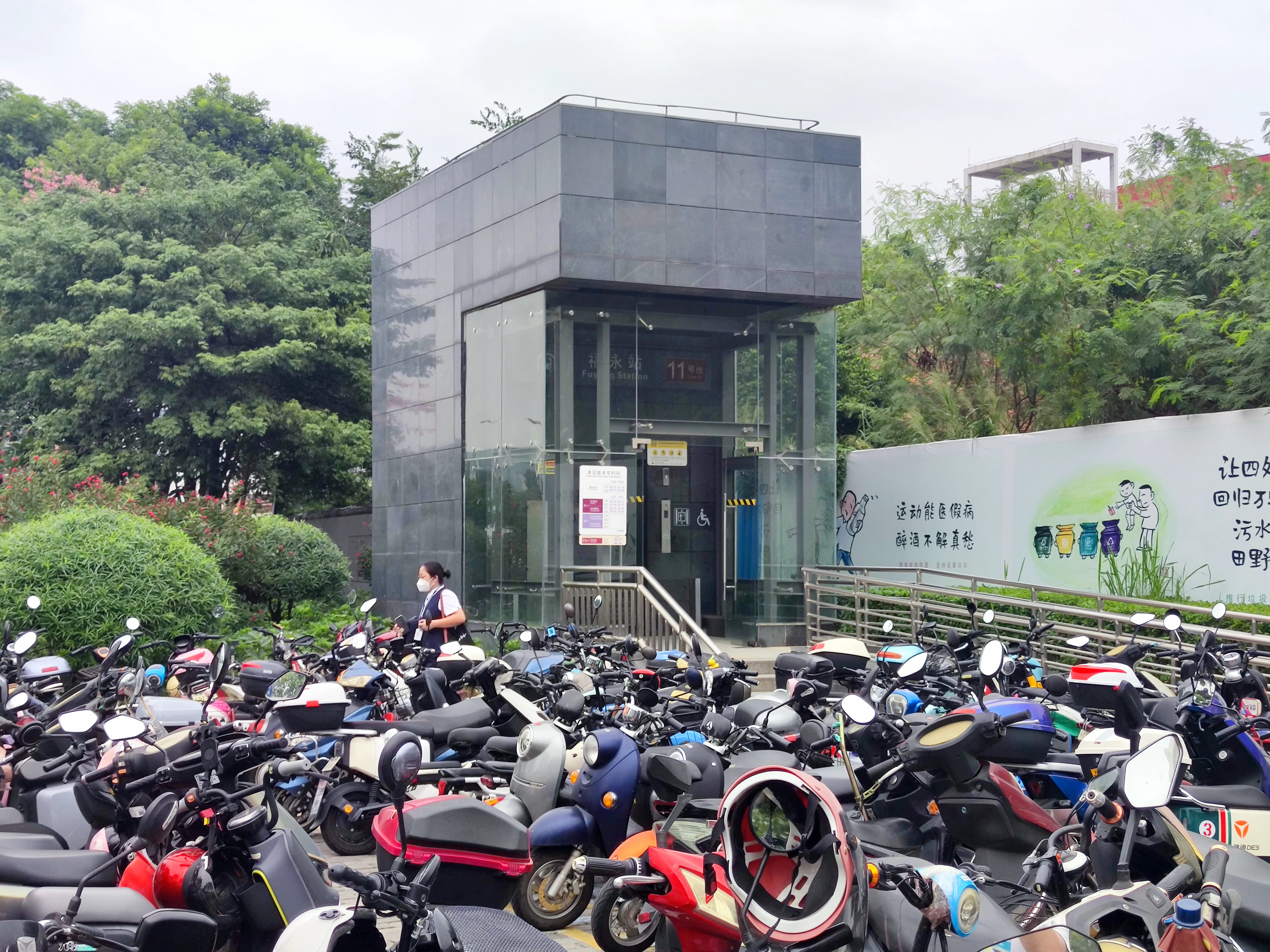
Entrance C (elevator entrance)

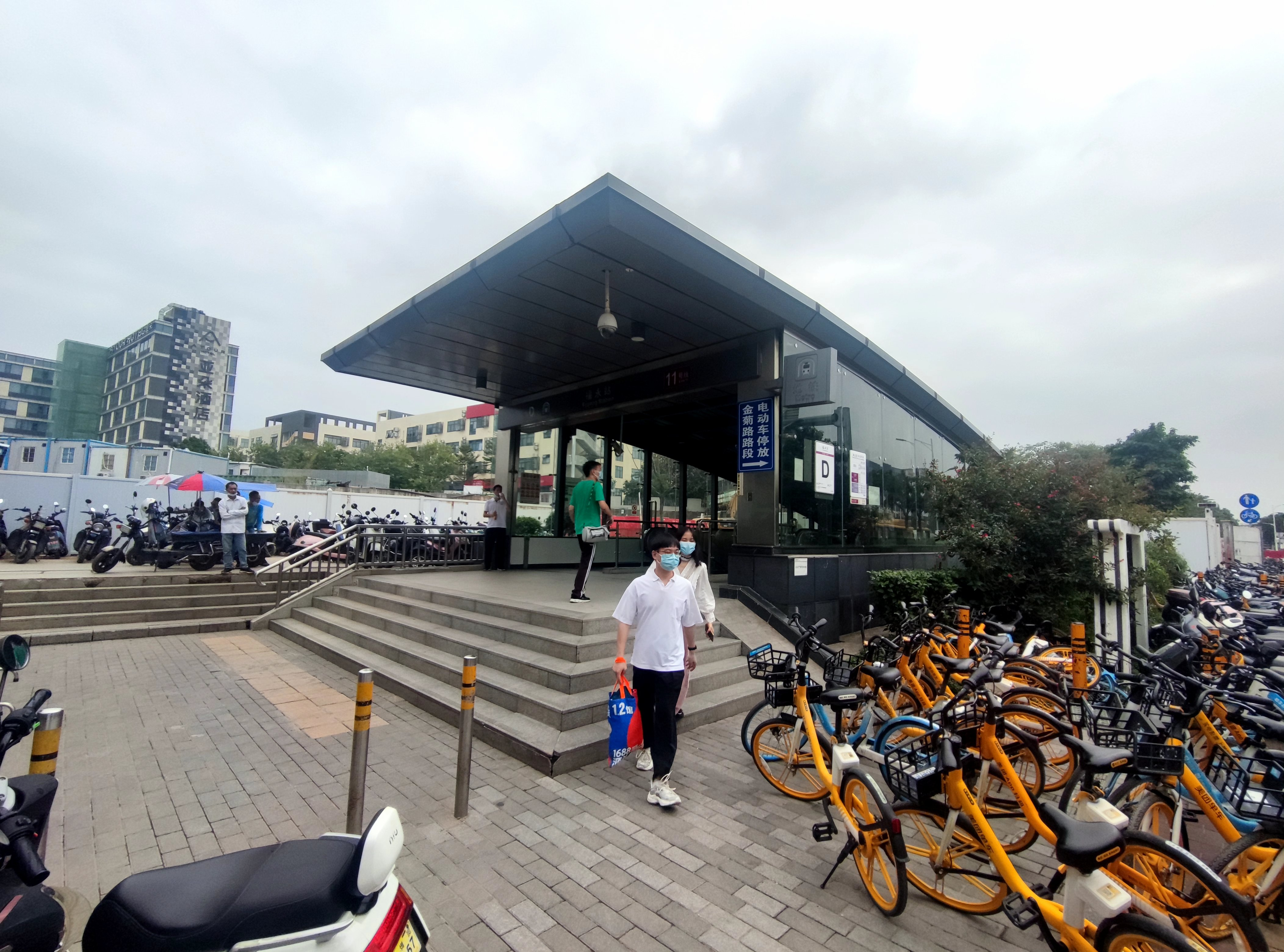
Entrance D

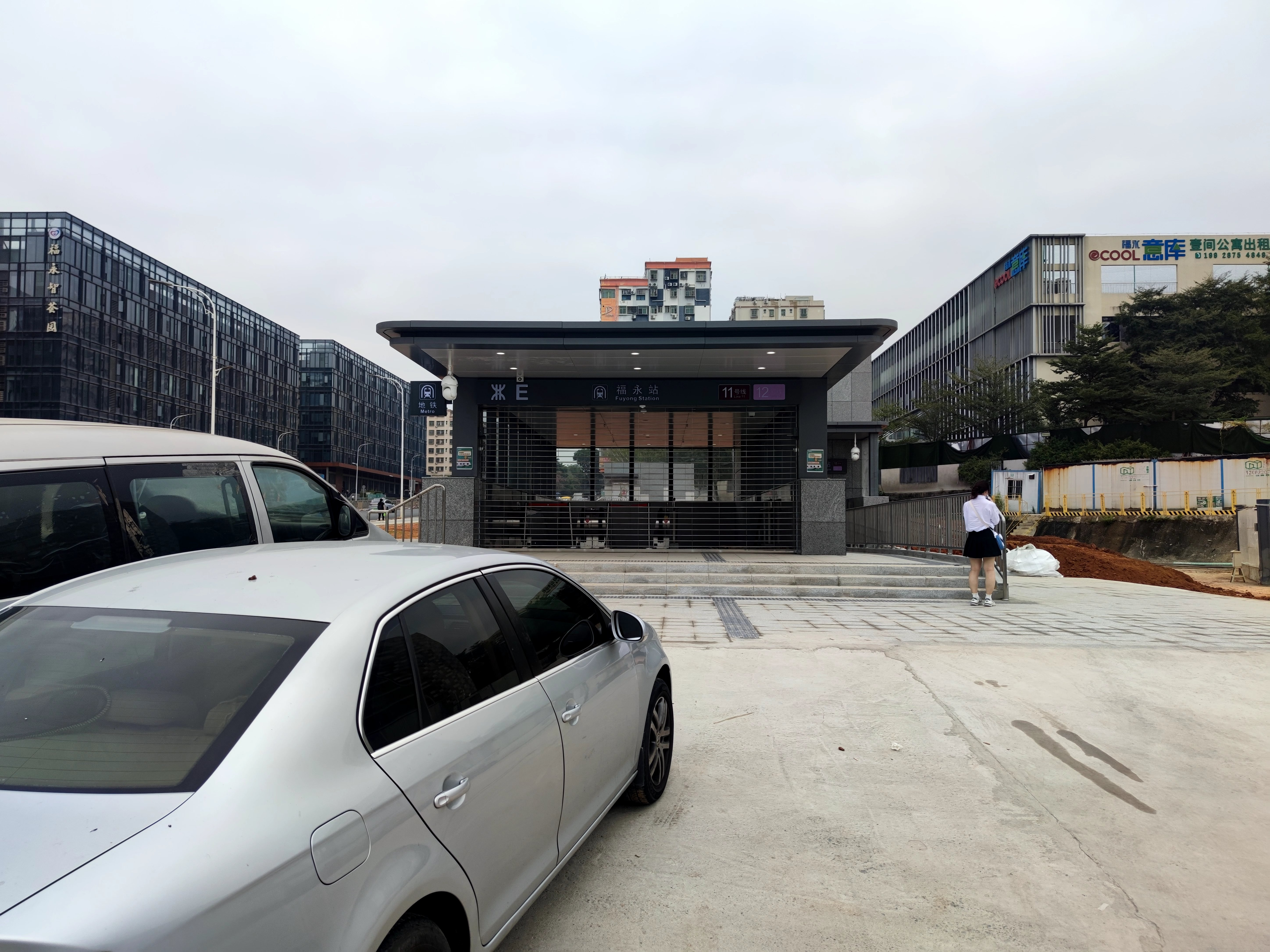
Entrance E

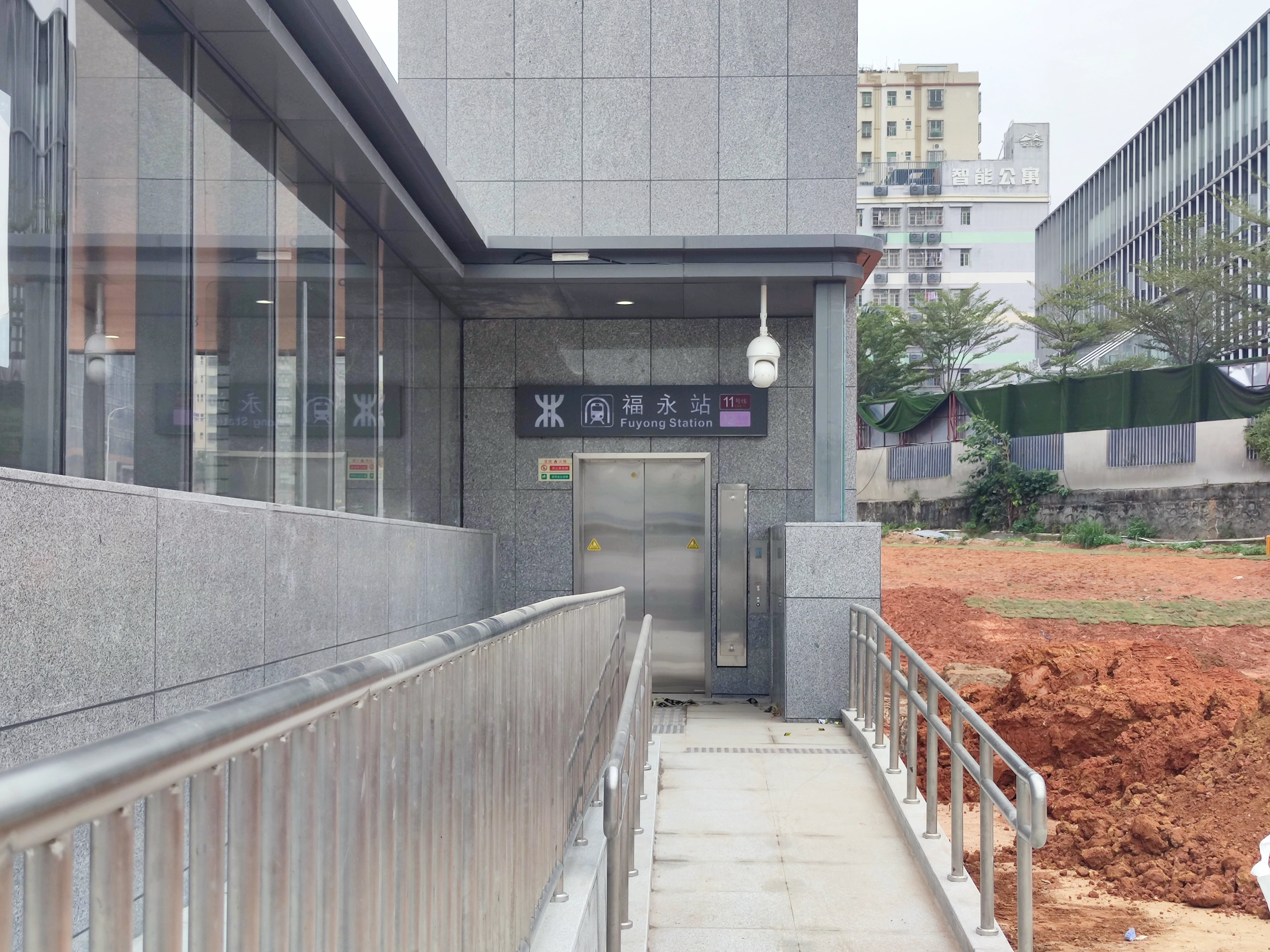
Entrance E (elevator entrance)

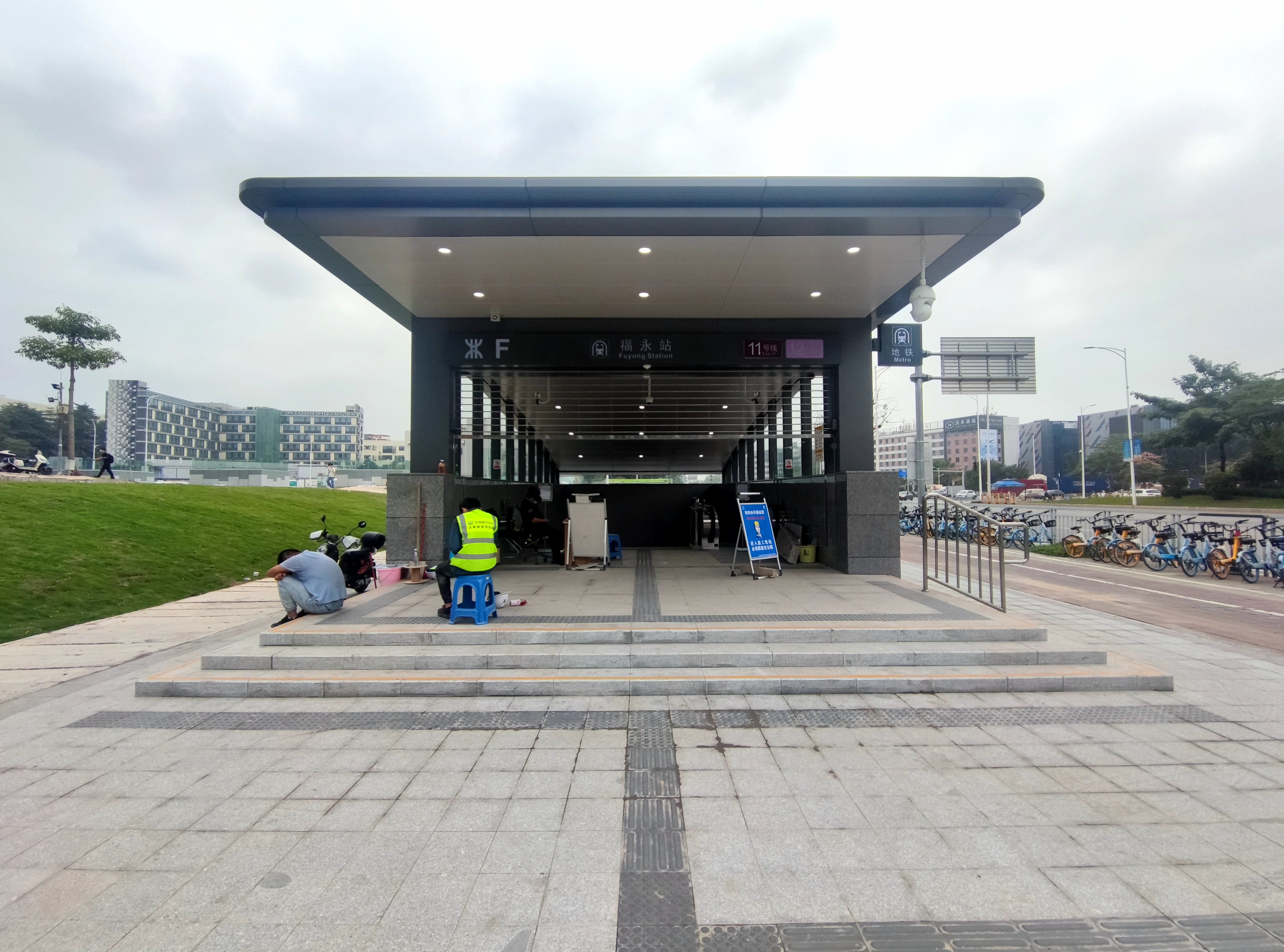
Entrance F

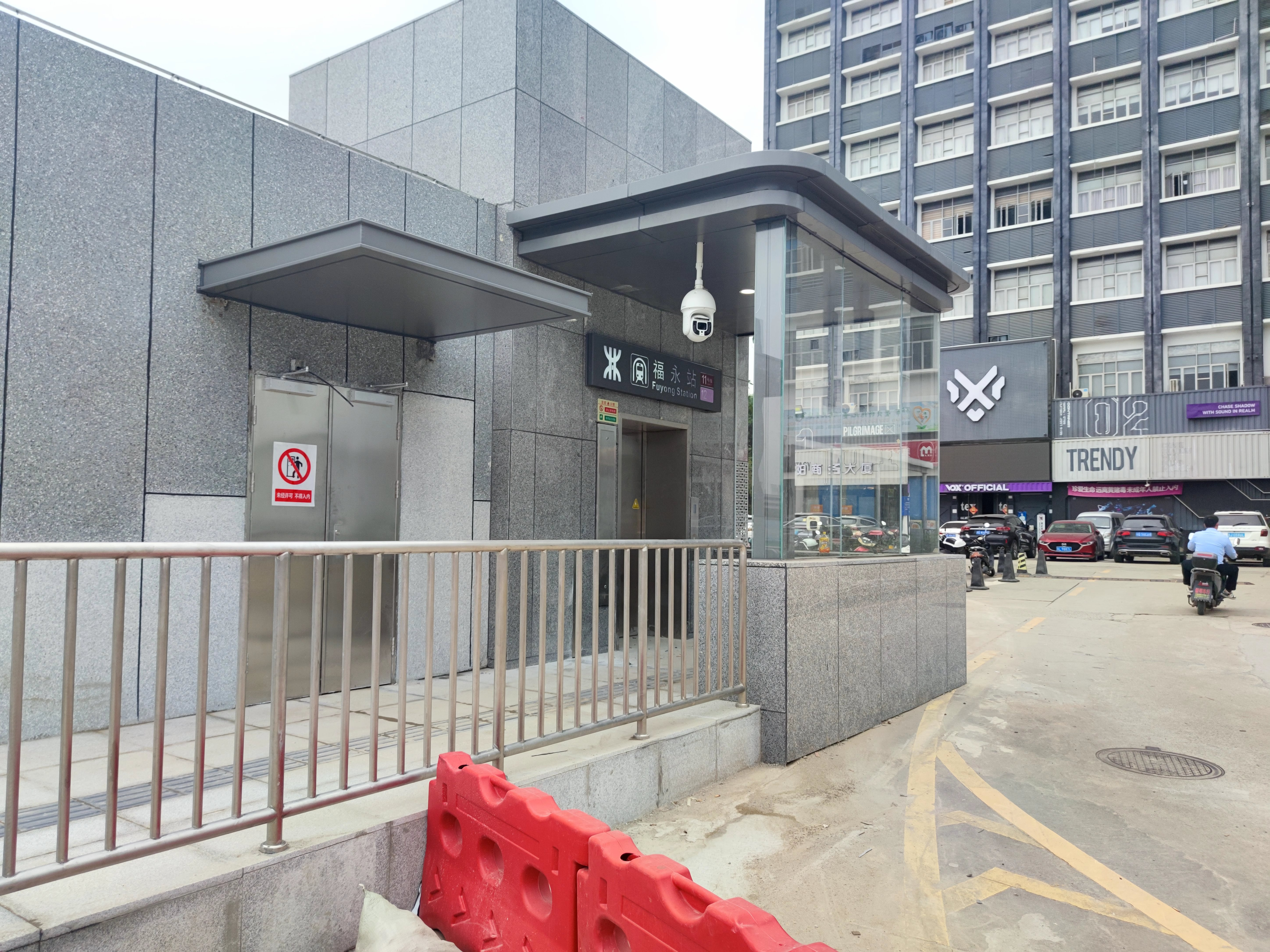
Entrance F (elevator entrance)

== Gallery ==
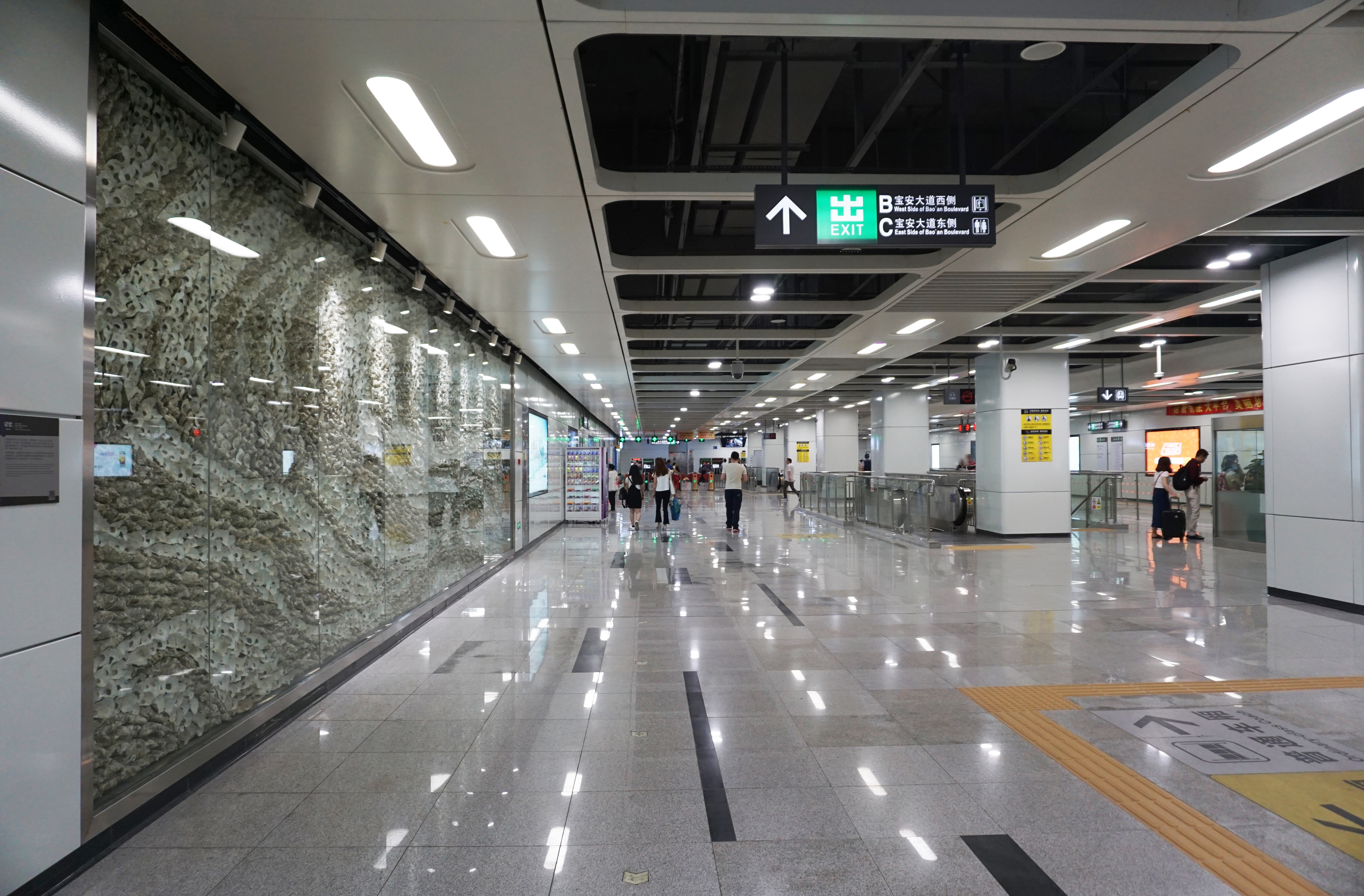
Line 11 concourse

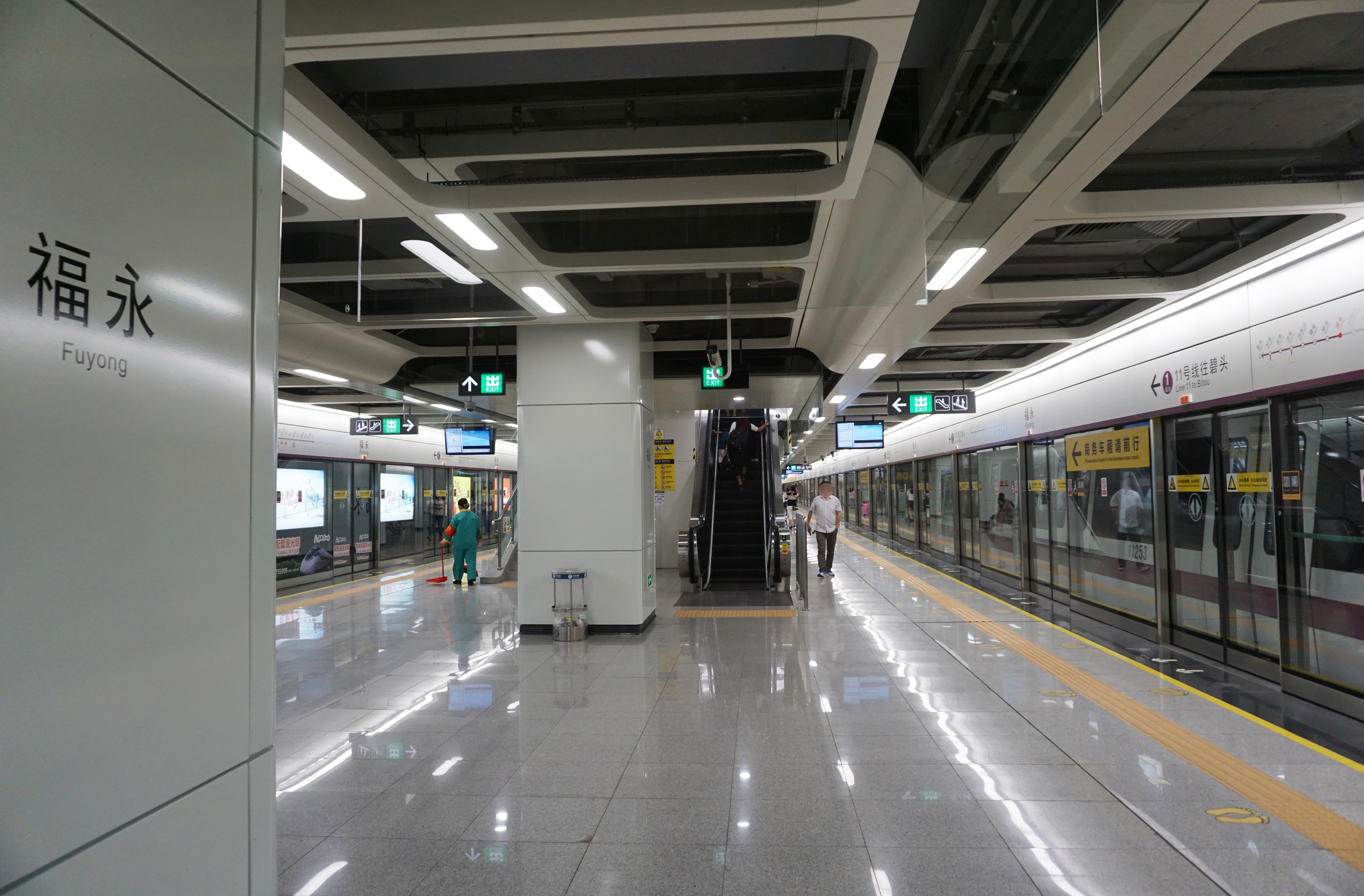
Line 11 platform

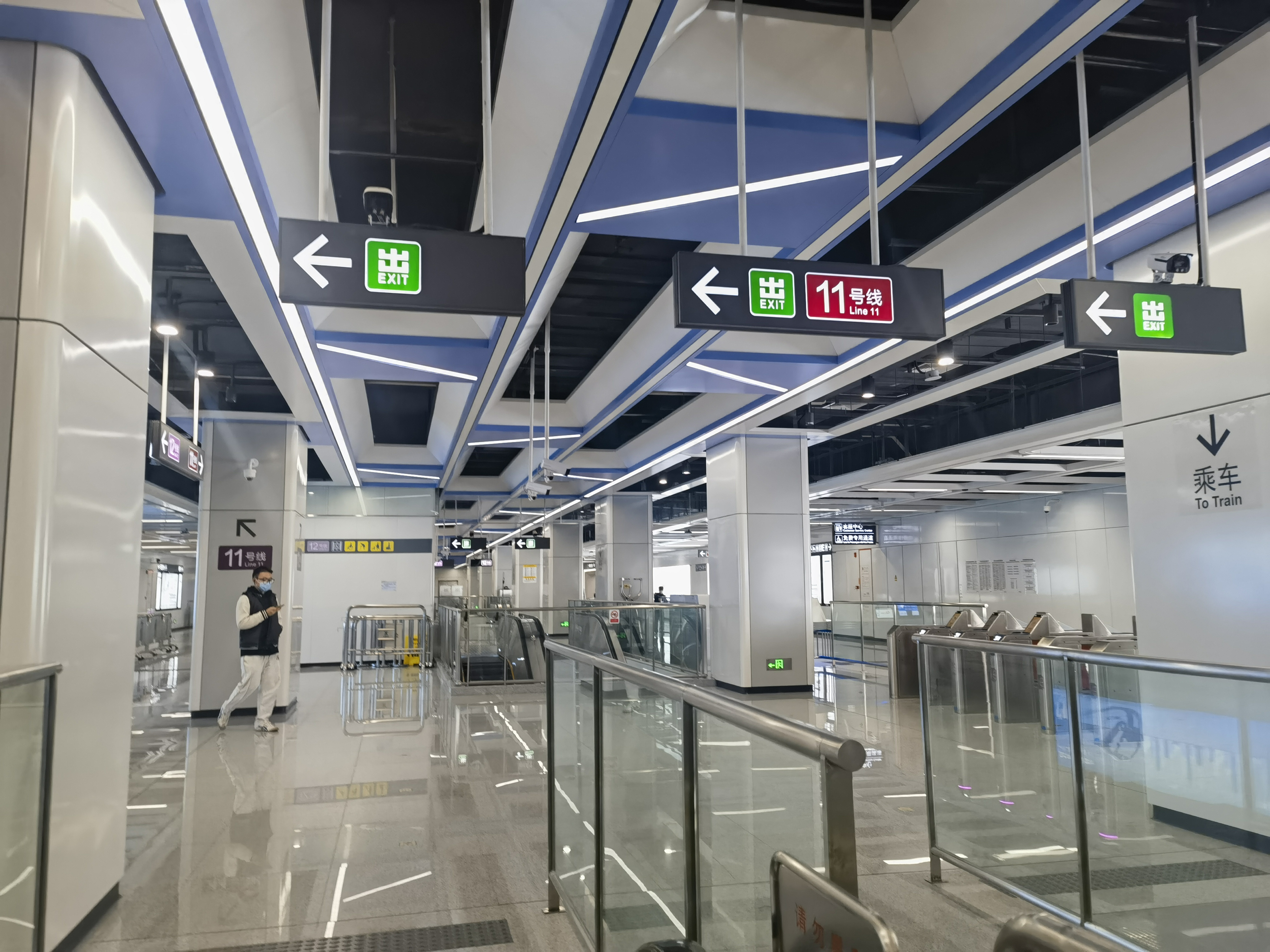
Line 12 concourse

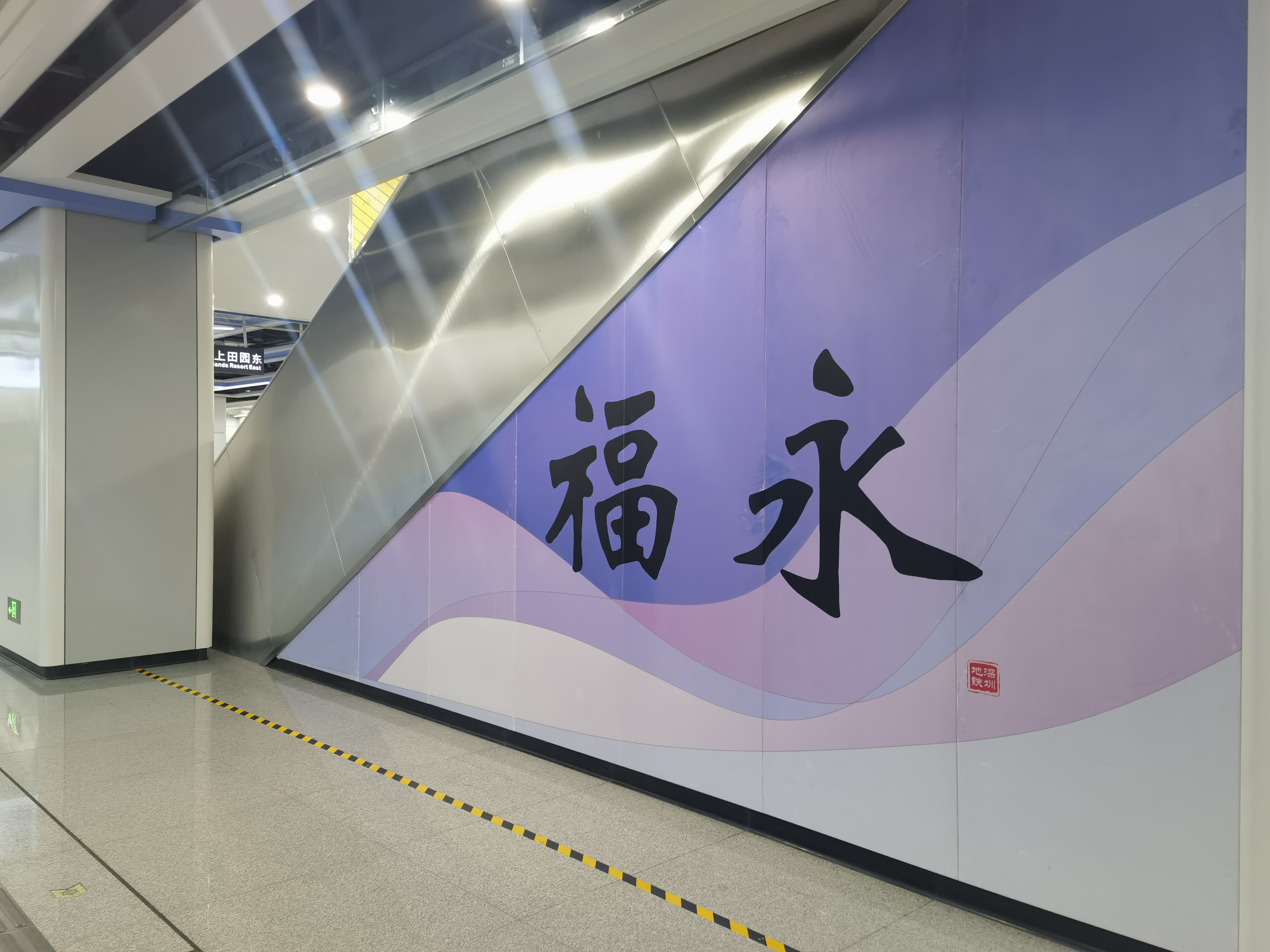
Line 12 calligraphy

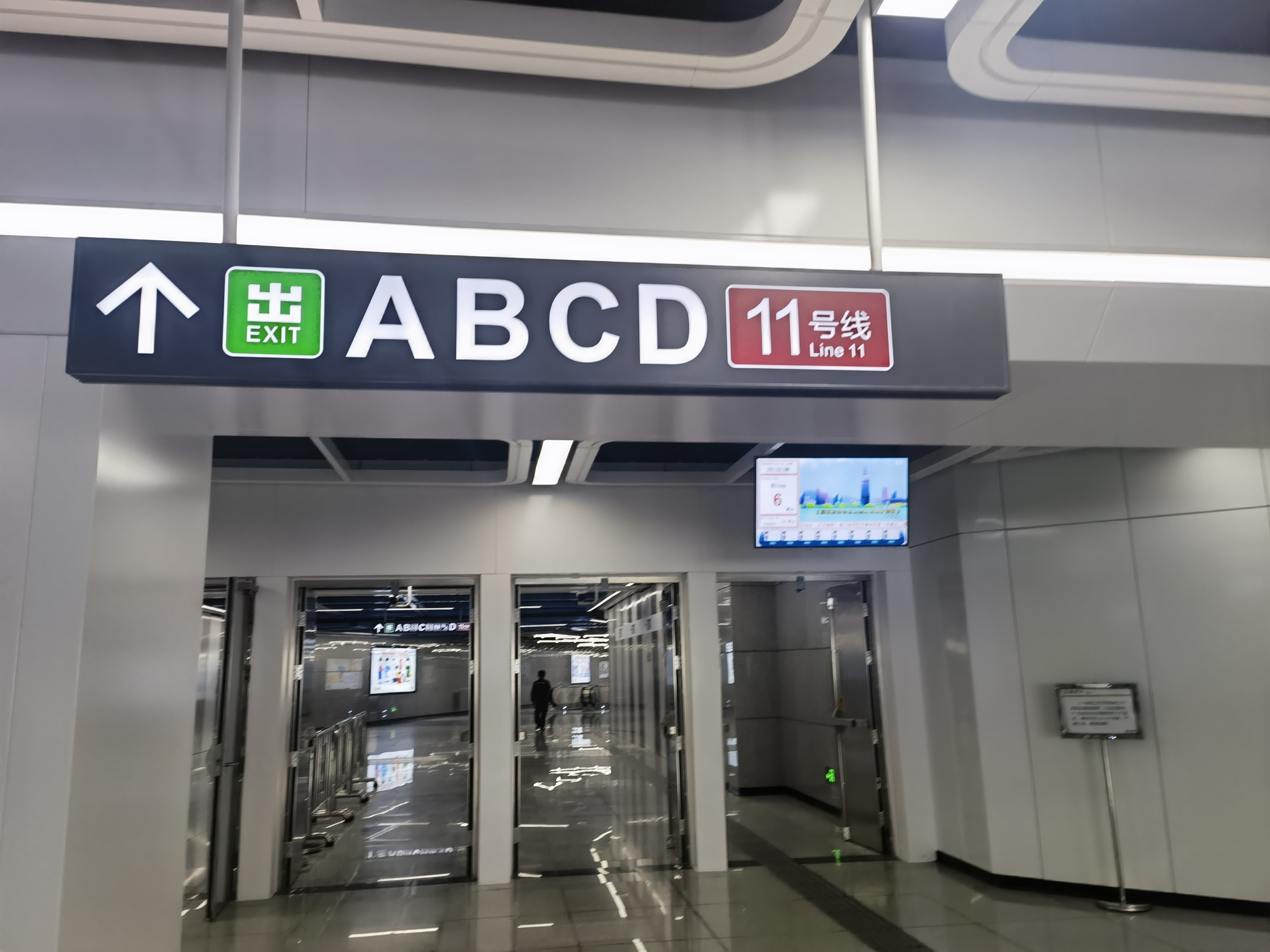
Transfer passageway
