= Qiaotou station (Shenzhen Metro) =

Metro station in Shenzhen, China

Qiaotou 桥头
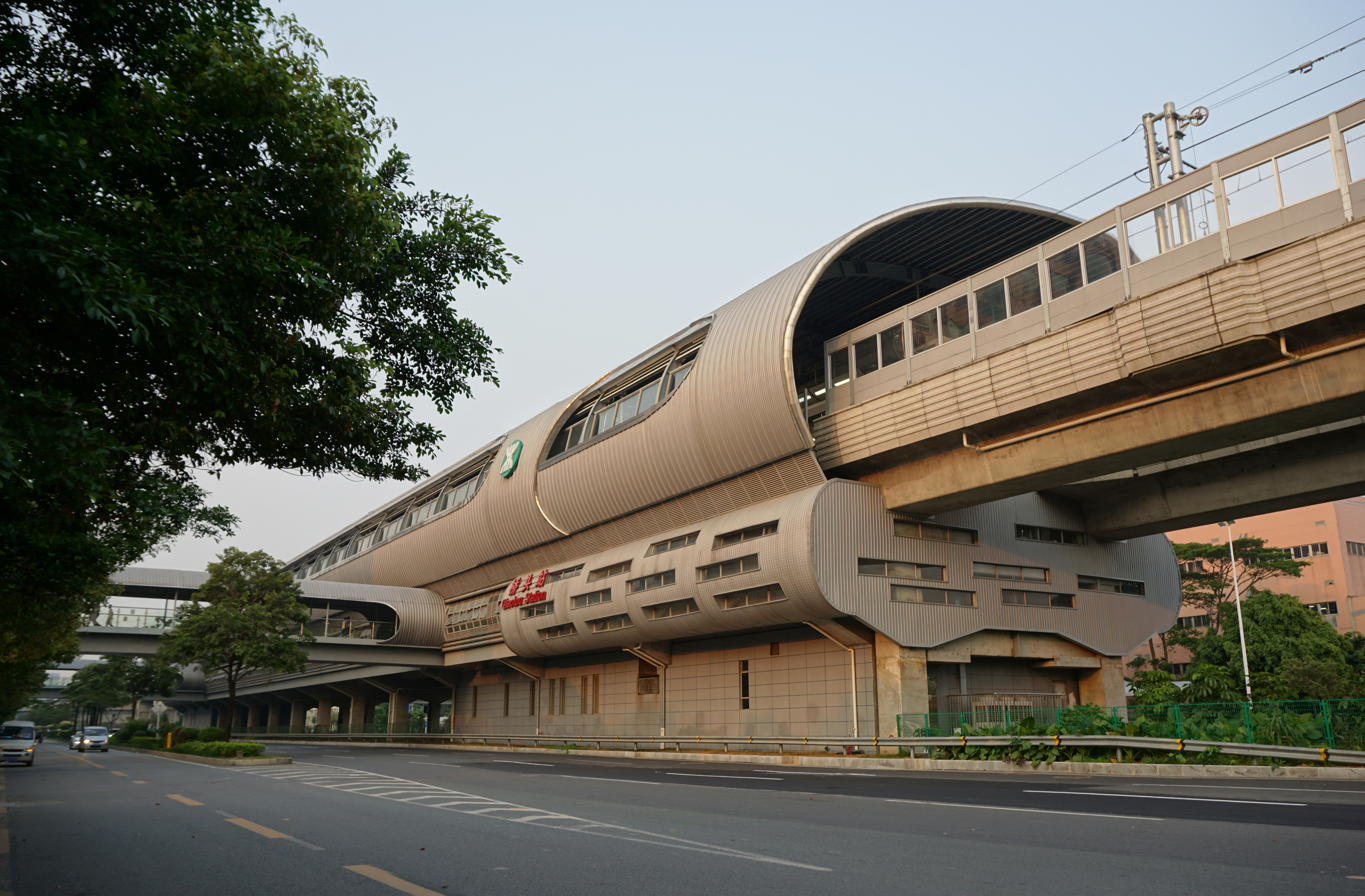
- Exterior

General information
- Location: Bao'an District, Shenzhen, Guangdong; China
- Coordinates: 22°41′37″N 113°49′3″E
- Operator: SZMC (Shenzhen Metro Group)
- Line: Line 11
- Platforms: 2 (1 island platform)
- Tracks: 2

Construction
- Structure type: Elevated
- Accessible: Yes

History
- Opened: 28 June 2016 (10 years ago)

Services
| Preceding station | Shenzhen Metro | Following station |
|---|---|---|
| Tangwei towards Bitou | Line 11 | Fuyong towards Hongling South |
Location

Qiaotou station (Chinese: 桥头站; pinyin: Qiáotóu Zhàn) is a station on Line 11 of the Shenzhen Metro in China. It opened on 28 June 2016.

== Station layout ==
| 3F; Platforms | Platform | 11 towards Bitou (Tangwei) |
| 3F; Platforms | Island platform, doors will open on the left |
| 3F; Platforms | Platform | 11 towards Hongling South (Fuyong) |
| 2F; Concourse | Lobby | Ticket Machines, Customer Service, Shops, Vending Machines |
| G | - | Exits A-D |

== Exits ==
| Exit | Destination |
|---|---|
| Exit A | Bao'an Boulevard (W), Fuyuan Industrial Zone |
| Exit B | Bao'an Boulevard (W), Qiaohe Road, Hanguang Building, Qiaotoucun |
| Exit C | Bao'an Boulevard (E), Fuyong Water Works |
| Exit D | Bao'an Boulevard (E), Wanfengcun |
