= Shajing station =

Metro station in Shenzhen, China

Shajing 沙井
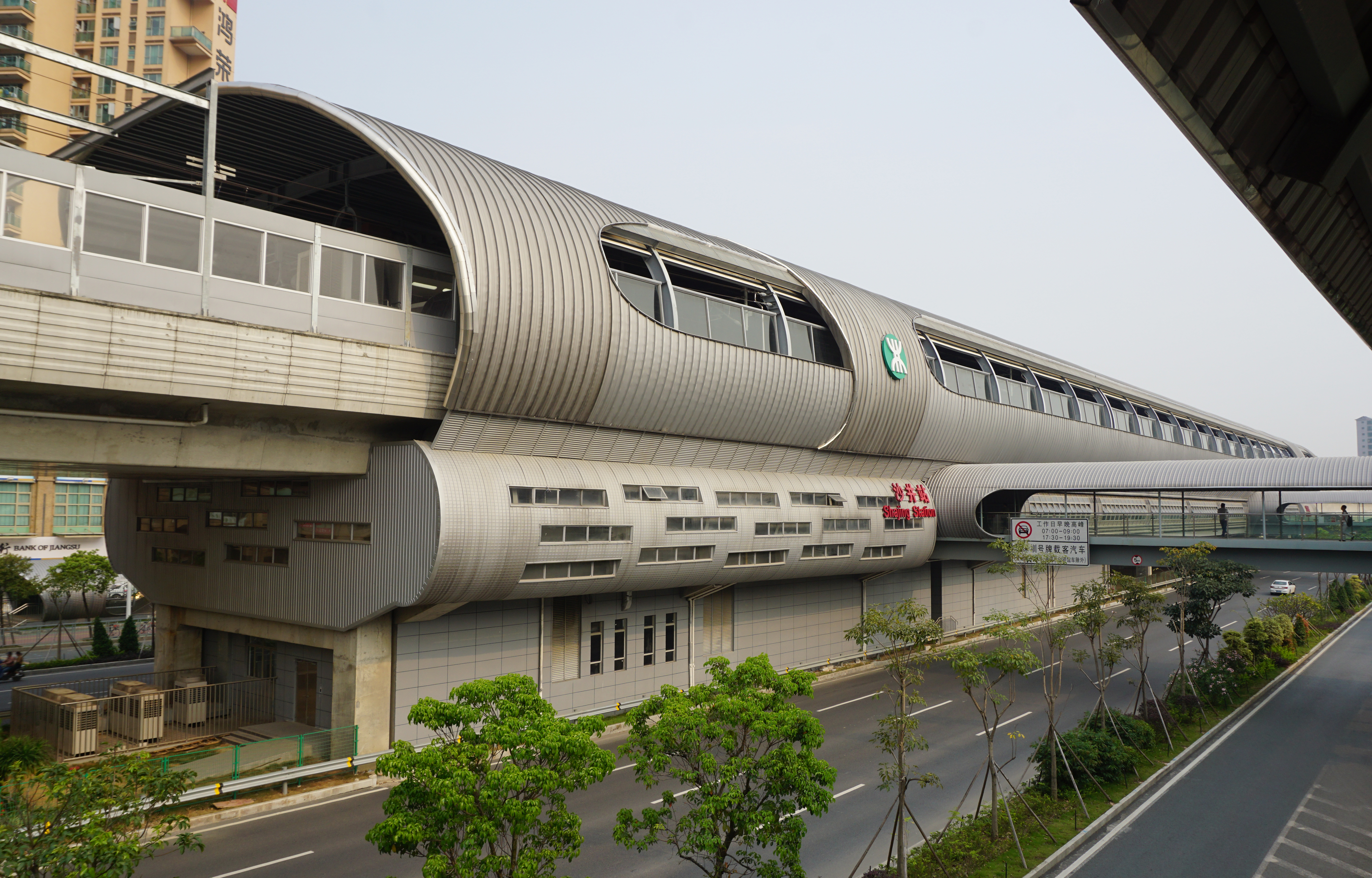
- Exterior

General information
- Location: Bao'an District, Shenzhen, Guangdong; China
- Coordinates: 22°44′10″N 113°49′52″E
- Operator: SZMC (Shenzhen Metro Group)
- Line: Line 11
- Platforms: 2 (1 island platform)
- Tracks: 2

Construction
- Structure type: Elevated
- Accessible: Yes

History
- Opened: 28 June 2016 (10 years ago)

Services
Preceding station	Shenzhen Metro	Following station
Houting towards Bitou	Line 11	Ma'anshan towards Hongling South
Location

Shajing station (Chinese: 沙井站; pinyin: Shājǐng Zhàn) is a station on Line 11 of the Shenzhen Metro in China. It opened on 28 June 2016.

== Station layout ==
3F; Platforms	Platform	11 towards Bitou (Houting)
3F; Platforms	Island platform, doors will open on the left
3F; Platforms	Platform	11 towards Hongling South (Ma'anshan)
2F; Concourse	Lobby	Ticket Machines, Customer Service, Shops, Vending Machines
G	-	Exits A-D

== Exits ==
Exit		Destination
Exit A		Bao'an Boulevard (W), Haoxiang Road, Bogang Community
Exit B	B1	Bao'an Boulevard (W), Bogang Hospital, Bogang Lychee Park
Exit B	B2	Bao'an Boulevard (W), Bogang Hospital, Bogang Lychee Park
Exit C		Bao'an Boulevard (E), Xinsha Road, Horoy Xiyuan
Exit D		Bao'an Boulevard (E), Shajing SEG
