= Houting station (Shenzhen Metro) =

Metro station in Shenzhen, China

Houting 后亭
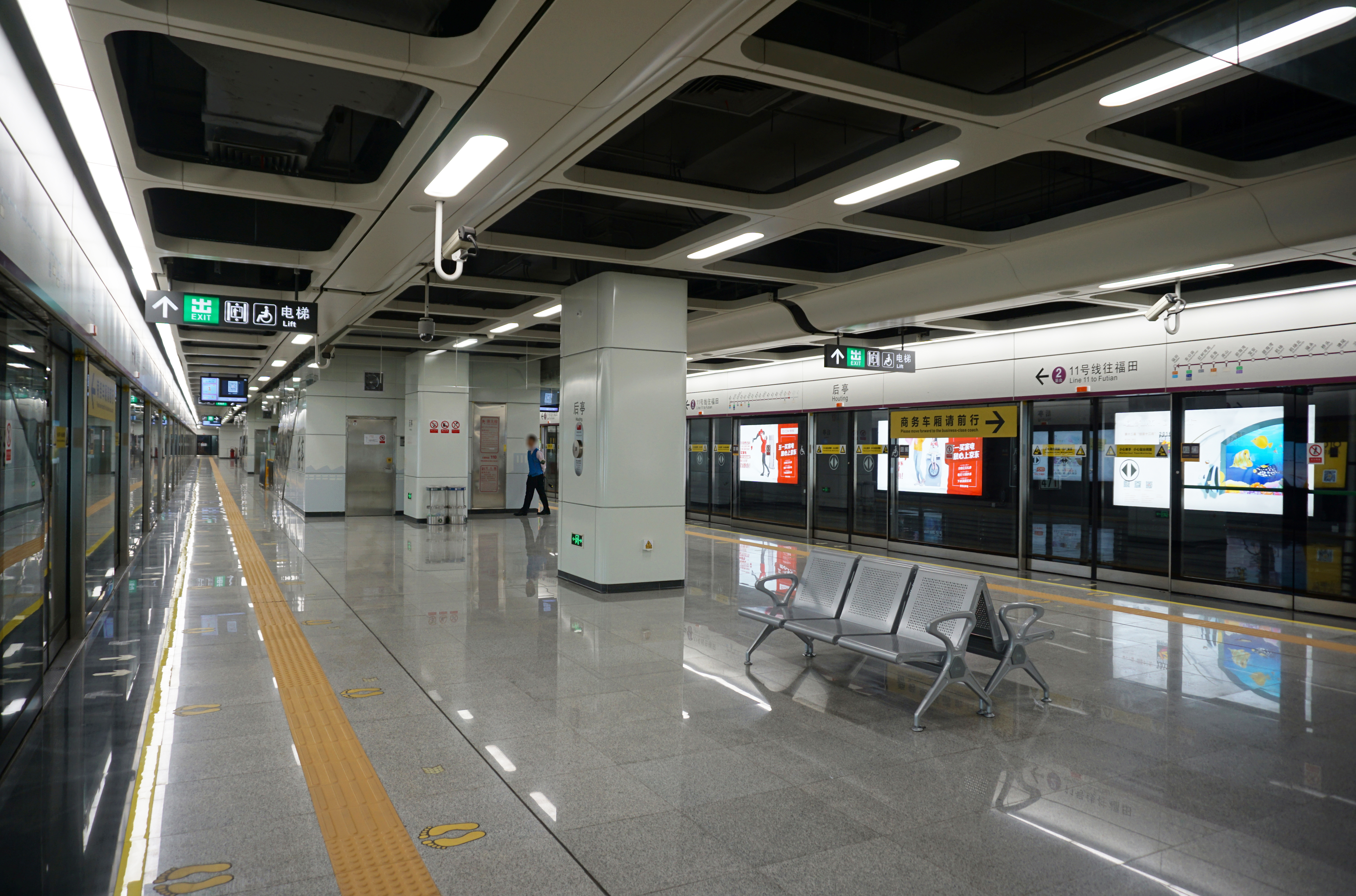
- Platform

General information
- Location: Bao'an District, Shenzhen, Guangdong; China
- Coordinates: 22°45′30″N 113°50′0″E
- Operated by: SZMC (Shenzhen Metro Group)
- Line: Line 11
- Platforms: 2 (1 island platform)
- Tracks: 2

Construction
- Structure type: Underground
- Accessible: Yes

History
- Opened: 28 June 2016 (10 years ago)

Services
Preceding station	Shenzhen Metro	Following station
Songgang towards Bitou	Line 11	Shajing towards Hongling South
Location

Houting station (Chinese: 后亭站; pinyin: Hòutíng Zhàn) is a station on Line 11 of the Shenzhen Metro in China. It opened on 28 June 2016.

== Station layout ==
G	-	Exit
B2F; Concourse	Lobby	Ticket Machines, Customer Service, Shops, Vending Machines
B3F; Platforms	Platform	11 towards Bitou (Songgang)
B3F; Platforms	Island platform, doors will open on the left
B3F; Platforms	Platform	11 towards Hongling South (Shajing)
