= Line 11 (Shenzhen Metro) =

Metro line in Shenzhen, China

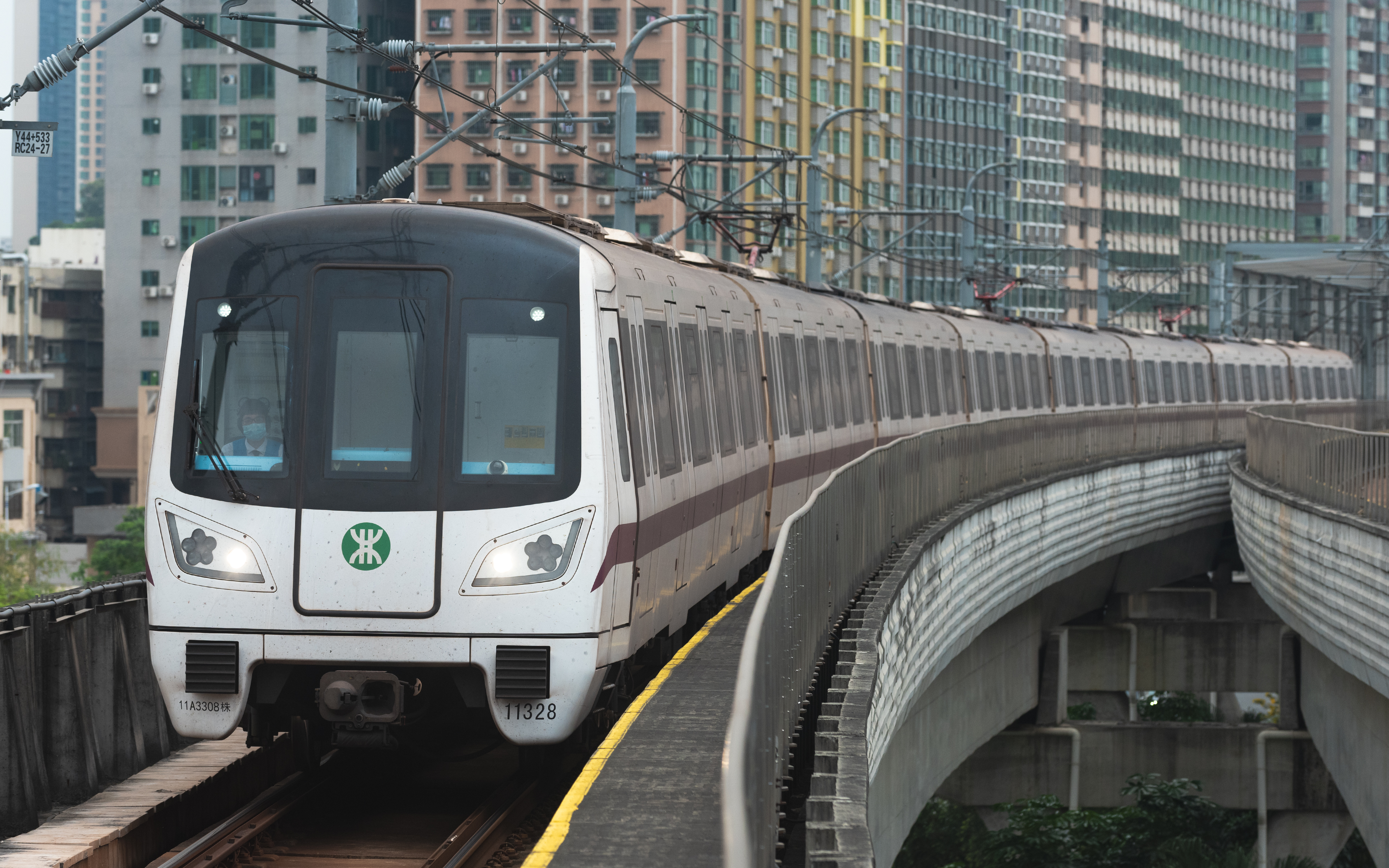

Overview
- Other name(s): Airport line (机场线; 機場綫; Jīchǎng xiàn; Chi^{1}-chʻang^{3} hsien^{4})
- Native name: 十一号线; 十一號綫; Shíyī hào xiàn
- Status: Operational
- Locale: Shenzhen, China
- Termini: Bitou; Hongling South
- Stations: 22
- Color on map: Tyrian purple (#6a1d44)

Service
- Type: Rapid transit
- System: Shenzhen Metro
- Operator: SZMC (Shenzhen Metro Group)
- Depot(s): Songgang depot Airport North stabling yard
- Rolling stock: CRRC Zhuzhou (1101-1133)(8A); Changchun Railway Vehicles (1134-1173)(8A)

History
- Opened: 28 June 2016; 10 years ago
- Last extension: 28 December 2025; 9 months ago

Technical
- Line length: 58.0 km (36.0 mi)
- Number of tracks: Double-track
- Character: Underground and elevated
- Track gauge: 1,435 mm (4 ft 8 1/2 in) standard gauge
- Electrification: Overhead lines (1500 volts)
- Operating speed: 120 km/h (75 mph)
- Signalling: Urbalis 888 CBTC Moving block

Line 11 of the Shenzhen Metro opened on 28 June 2016. Line 11 has a length of 53.5 km (33.2 mi) and a total of 19 stations. It connects the CBDs of Futian, Nanshan and Qianhai to Shenzhen Bao'an International Airport and onward to Fuyong, Shajing and Songgang suburban areas. It serves as both a regional express line from the west coast of Shenzhen to the city core area and an airport rail link. Compared with the other lines of Shenzhen Metro, Line 11 has a longer spacing between stops for a higher speed service. Trains of Line 11 were designed to run at 120 km/h (75 mph), up to 50% faster than other lines, but currently limited to 80 km/h (50 mph) in some sections for infrastructure, tunnel wind pressure, track geometry issues and noise reasons. Construction of Line 11 started in April 2012 and test running begun at the end of March 2016. Trains ran at a 4-minute frequency between Futian and Airport North, 8-minute frequency for full length trains during morning rush hours, 5-minute interval for full length during evening rush hours, and 6-minute interval for non-peak hours. Increasing demand on Line 11 led to Shenzhen Metro purchasing more trains in 2020, reducing headways to as low as every 2 min 10 seconds. Currently it takes slightly more than half an hour to travel from Futian to the Airport.

== History ==
In 2007, the "Shenzhen City Rail Transit Construction Plan (2011 to 2020)" was publicly announced for the first time, which included the plans for Line 11. The plan calls for an express metro line running along the western coast of Shenzhen with through services to Dongguan, Guangzhou and beyond via the Guangzhou–Shenzhen intercity railway which was then envisioned to be an intercity metro line. In December 2008, a ground breaking ceremony was held for the project, attended by Party Secretary Wang Yang and Governor Huang Huahua. However, design changes started immediately after due to disagreements on how to integrate the metro project with the intercity line. Subsequently, the project was postponed.

In July 2010, China Railway Minister Liu Zhijun and Guangdong Executive Vice Governor Zhu Xiaodan held talks to speed up railway construction in Guangdong. The result was a new plan to construct a Pearl River Delta Metropolitan Region intercity railway network. The Guangzhou–Shenzhen intercity railway was redesigned from a rapid transit line to a regional rail line and will no longer enter the central area of Shenzhen. Instead the Guangzhou–Shenzhen intercity railway shall terminate at Airport station with interchange for Line 11 but no through services.

=== Timeline ===
Segment	Commencement	Length	Station(s)	Name
Bitou — Futian	28 June 2016	51.936 km (32.27 mi)	18	Phase 1
Futian — Gangxia North	28 October 2022	1.68 km (1.04 mi)	1	Phase 2 (Initial Section)
Gangxia North — Huaqiang South	28 December 2024	2.05 km (1.27 mi)	2	Phase 2
Huaqiang South — Hongling South	28 December 2025	2.34 km (1.45 mi)	1	Phase 2 (Remaining Section)

== Service routes ==
- Hongling South — Songgang / Bitou
- Hongling South — Airport North (Monday – Friday AM peak hours only)

== Stations ==
Service routes		Station name		Connections	Nearby bus stops	Distance km		Location
Service routes		English	Chinese	Connections	Nearby bus stops	Distance km		Location
●		Bitou	碧头		长安26 656 M495	0.00	0.00	Bao'an
●		Songgang	松岗	6 12	656 B641 M255 M291 M490 M512	1.90	1.90	Bao'an
●		Houting	后亭		652 656 779 782 B774 B867 B895 M442	2.30	4.20	Bao'an
●		Shajing	沙井		639 656 780 782 B716 B776 B894 M284 M333 M387 M397	2.40	6.60	Bao'an
●		Ma'anshan	马安山		782 M284 M387 M397	1.75	8.35	Bao'an
●		Tangwei	塘尾		327 866 868区间2 B893 M237 M251 M252 M367 M387	1.75	10.10	Bao'an
●		Qiaotou	桥头		866 868区间2 B876 B892 M291 M310 M387	1.70	11.80	Bao'an
●		Fuyong	福永	12	338 B635 B929 M159 M236 M237 M251 M252 M291 M310 M331 M351 M387 M395 M472 M514	1.75	13.55	Bao'an
●	●	Airport North	机场北	20; SBA		2.65	16.20	Bao'an
●	●	Airport	机场	SZX; SCA	330/Airport 1（机场1）330B 330C 790 E16 E21 M416 M371 M387 M387区间 M416 Airport 2（机场2） Airport 4（机场4） Airport 6（机场6） Airport 7（机场7） Airport 8（机场8） Airport 9（机场9） Airport 10（机场10）	3.65	19.85	Bao'an
●	●	Bihaiwan	碧海湾		320 718 797 B847 B887 B910 M200 M473	7.00	26.85	Bao'an
●	●	Bao'an	宝安		631 797 B630 B828 E15 M200 M210 M376 M473 M507	3.40	30.25	Bao'an
●	●	Qianhaiwan	前海湾	1 5	M158 M562 T01A Talent Port Line T01B（T01B人才港专线）Torch Line T01B（T01B火炬专线）T168 T188	2.70	32.95	Nanshan; Qianhai
●	●	Nanshan	南山	12	58 74 204 369 377 E3 M105 M182 M222 M241 M347 M372 M463 M483 M506 M562 N4	4.20	37.15	Nanshan
●	●	Houhai	后海	2 8 13	229 B605 B615 B669 E12 M209 M299 M429 M467 M474 M519 N24 Peak-time 10（高峰10）	1.90	39.05	Nanshan
●	●	Hongshuwan South	红树湾南	9 29	49 M561	3.25	42.30	Nanshan
●	●	Chegongmiao	车公庙	1 7 9	21 26 63 64 71 79 101 113 204 222 223 303 320 324 326 328 338 E1 E6 E12 E37 E38 M102 M169 M191 M213 M392 M413 M447 M448 M500 M555 M559 N4 Peak-express 14（高快14）Peak-express 16（高快16）Peak-express 18（高快18）Peak-express 31（高快31）Peak-express 47（高快47）Peak-express 60（高快60）Peak-express 70（高快70）Peak-time 3（高峰3）Peak-time 16（高峰16）Peak-time 18（高峰18）Peak-time 49（高峰49）Peak-time 62（高峰62）Peak-time 119（高峰119）Peak-time 221（高峰221）City Night Sightseeing Line（城市夜景线）Ecological Technology Line（科技生态线）	5.75	48.05	Futian
●	●	Futian	福田	2 8 3 NZQ	32 101 113 123 204 223 234 327 330/Airport 1（机场1） B613 E18 E28 K204 M221 M413 N4 Peak-time 15（高峰15） Peak-time 18（高峰18） Peak-time 38（高峰38） Peak-time 49（高峰49） Peak-time 62（高峰62） Peak-time 119（高峰119）City Night Sightseeing Line（城市夜景线）	3.10	51.93	Futian
●	●	Gangxia North	岗厦北	2 8 10 14	101 113 204 223 303 320 326 M102 M103 M106 M133 M190 M447 M448 Peak-express 47（高快47）Peak-express 60（高快60）Peak-time 3（高峰3）Peak-time 49（高峰49）Peak-time 119（高峰119）Peak-time 221（高峰221）	1.68	53.61	Futian
●	●	Fuxing	福星			1.35	54.96	Futian
●	●	Huaqiang South	华强南	7	13 14 38 52 62 63 73 216 223 229 337 366 369 377 B930 E13 E25 E26 M112 M133 M137 M182 M193 M405 M463 M559 Peak-express 6（高快6）Peak-time 91（高峰91）	0.70	55.66	Futian
●	●	Hongling South	红岭南	9 (OSI); 1 2 8 5 (via Grand Theater)	3 10 14 12 29 85 101 104 113 203 204 223 M103 M106 M112 M133 M152 M159 M192 M482	2.34	58.00	Luohu

=== Future Development ===
Line 11 is planned to have a northern extension into Chang'an, Dongguan with transfers to Dongguan Rail Transit.

== Rolling stock ==
The airport line initially uses 33 sets of Size A subway trains in eight car sets (no. 1101–1133) with a maximum speed of 120 km/h (75 mph), including two six standard class carriages and two Business Class carriages. On 4 July 2015, the first train completed eight months of commissioning work, and 10 trains have been delivered from CRRC Zhuzhou as of March 2016. The maximum train capacity is 2564 people.

In 2023, a new batch of 40 trains with redesigned front and interior was introduced to bolster the fleet and provide extra trains for the extension to Hongling South..

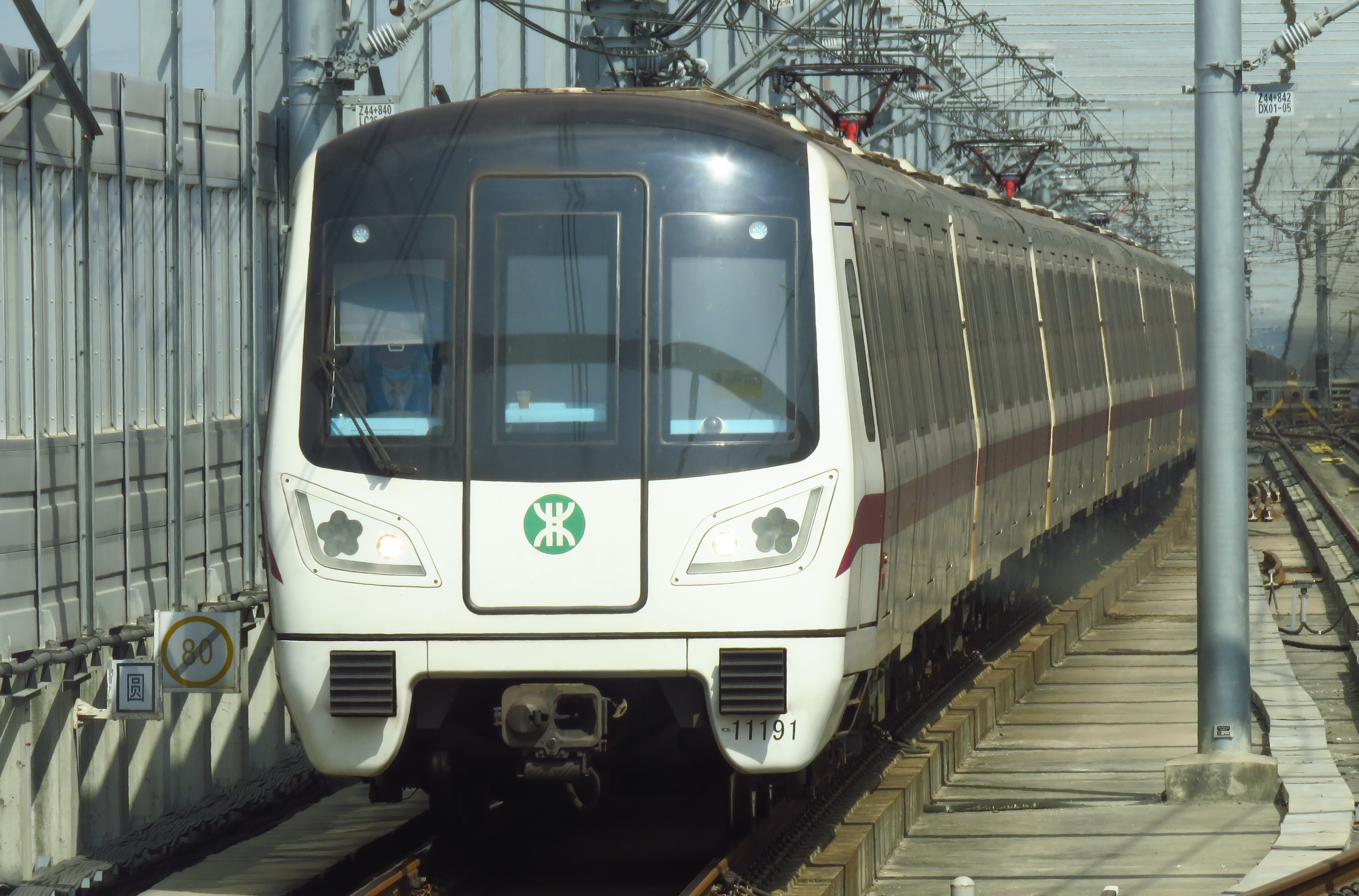
A CRRC Zhuzhou Electric Locomotive Works train

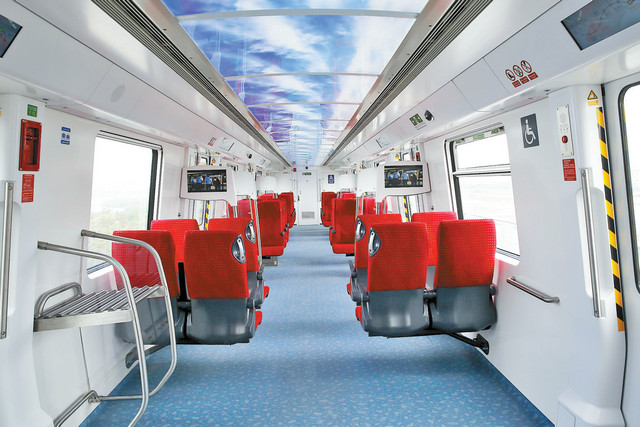
CRRC Zhuzhou Electric Locomotive Works train business class interior

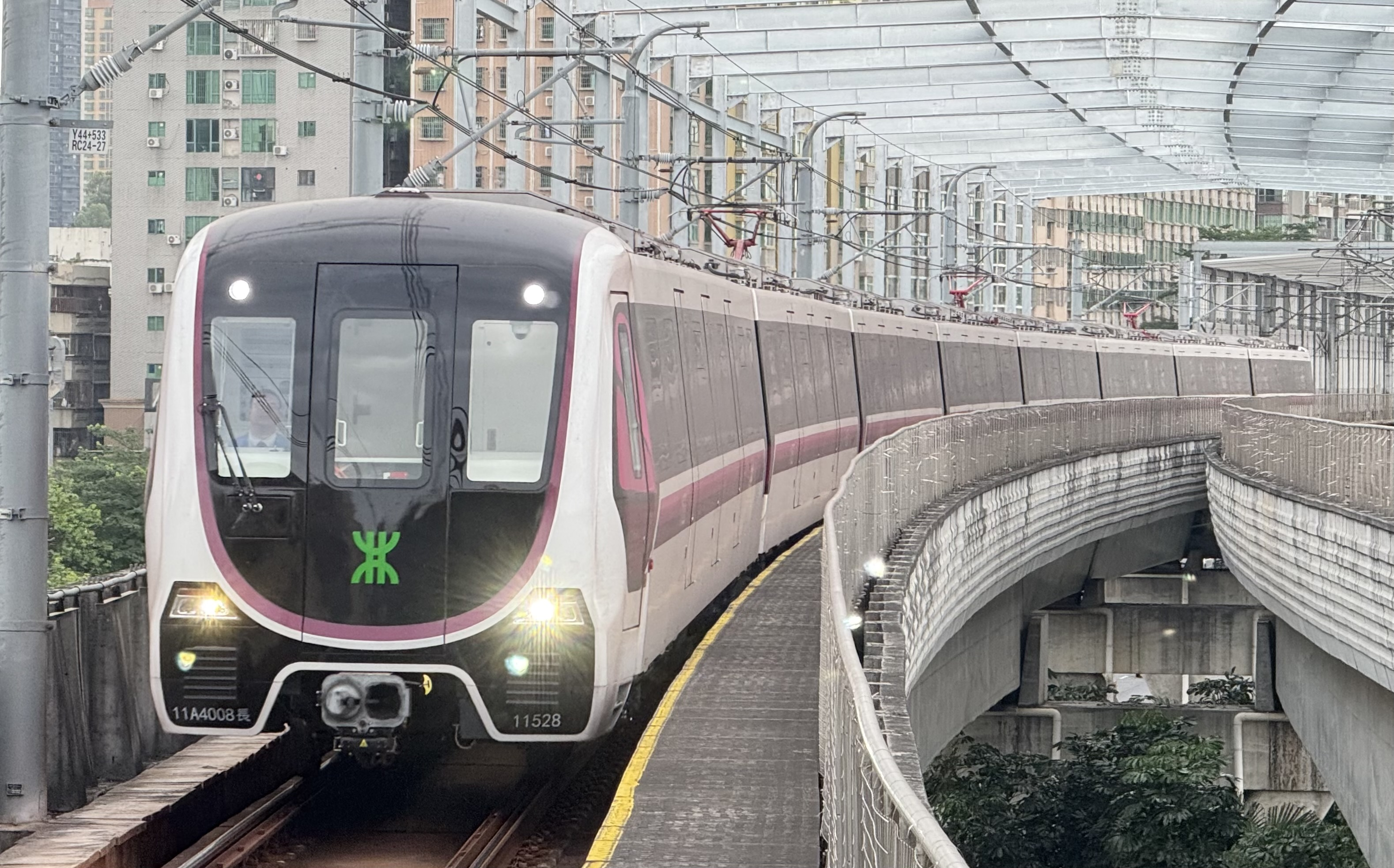
A Changchun Railway Vehicles train

Type	Date of manufacture	Series	Sets	Serial number	Assembly	Notes
Type A	2015 – 2016	A-size stock	33	1101-1133	Tc+Mp+M+Mp+M+M+Mp+Tc	Manufactured by CRRC Zhuzhou Electric Locomotive Works
Type A	2023 - 2024	A-size stock	40	1134-1173	Tc+Mp+M+Mp+M+M+Mp+Tc	Manufactured by Changchun Railway Vehicles

=== Business Class ===
Business Class has transverse seating and curtains for comfort and luggage racks for airport passengers. To ride Business Class passengers have to pay a premium for their ticket, similar to First Class on the MTR East Rail line. Business Class carriages are marked by dark grey floor tiles and yellow panels above the platform screen doors. Standard class carriages are marked by light grey floor tiles and white panels above the doors.

== Fares ==
Two kinds of fares are charged on Line 11. In standard class, the fare is equivalent to other metro lines. Business Class is three times as expensive as standard class. Standard class fares range between 2 and 10 yuan, with Business Class ranging between 6 and 30 yuan. Because of the possibility of transfers, this makes the maximum possible fare on the Shenzhen Metro 35 yuan. Business Class can be accessed through placing the Shenzhen Tong on a validator or through purchasing a yellow token (standard tokens are green). 11% of passengers travel by Business Class, while the rest travels in standard class.
