= Bitou station =

Metro station in Shenzhen, Guangdong, China

Bitou 碧头
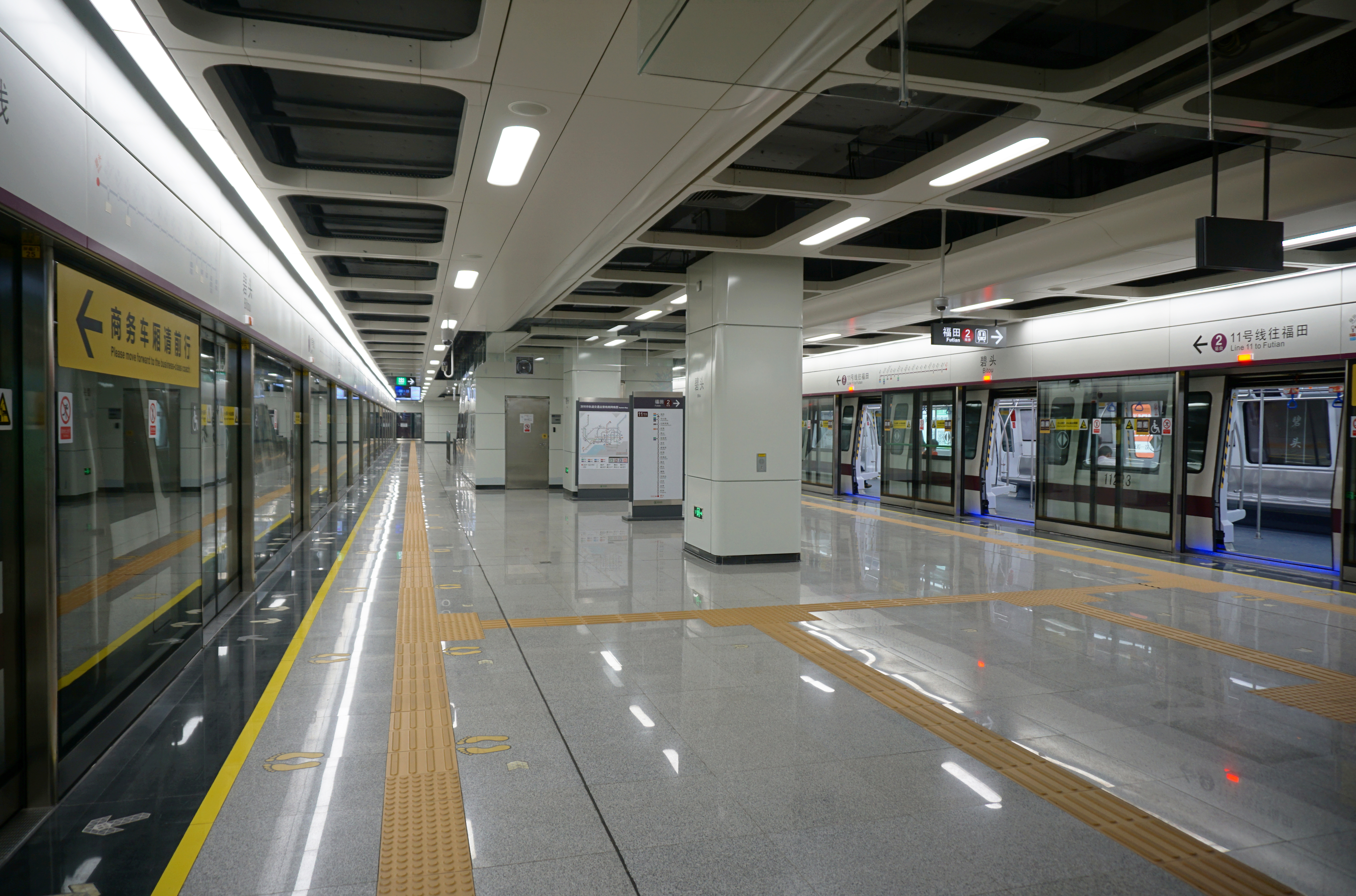
- Platform

General information
- Location: Bao'an District, Shenzhen, Guangdong; China
- Coordinates: 22°47′20″N 113°49′35.5″E
- Operator: SZMC (Shenzhen Metro Group)
- Line: Line 11
- Platforms: 2 (1 island platform)
- Tracks: 2

Construction
- Structure type: Elevated
- Accessible: Yes

History
- Opened: 28 June 2016 (10 years ago)

Services
| Preceding station | Shenzhen Metro | Following station |
|---|---|---|
| Terminus | Line 11 | Songgang towards Hongling South |
Location

Bitou station (Chinese: 碧头站; pinyin: Bìtóu Zhàn) is a station on Line 11 of the Shenzhen Metro in China. It opened on 28 June 2016.

== Station layout ==
| G | - | Exits A-E |
| B2F; Concourse | Lobby | Ticket Machines, Customer Service, Shops, Vending Machines |
| B3F; Platforms | Platform | 11 reserved platform |
| B3F; Platforms | Island platform, doors will open on the right |
| B3F; Platforms | Platform | 11 towards Hongling South (Songgang) |

== Exits ==
| Exit | Destination |
|---|---|
| Exit A | Langbi Road (W), SZMC Songgang Depot |
| Exit B | Langbi Road (W) |
| Exit C | Songfu Boulevard (N), Shitoulong Park, Oumeijia Furniture Mall |
| Exit D | Langbi Road (E), Pukyo Semiconductor Industrial Park |
| Exit E | Langbi Road (E), Shapuwei Venture Industrial Park |
