= Menghai station =

Metro station in Shenzhen, Guangdong, China

Coordinates: 22°31′46″N 113°59′6″E

Menghai 梦海
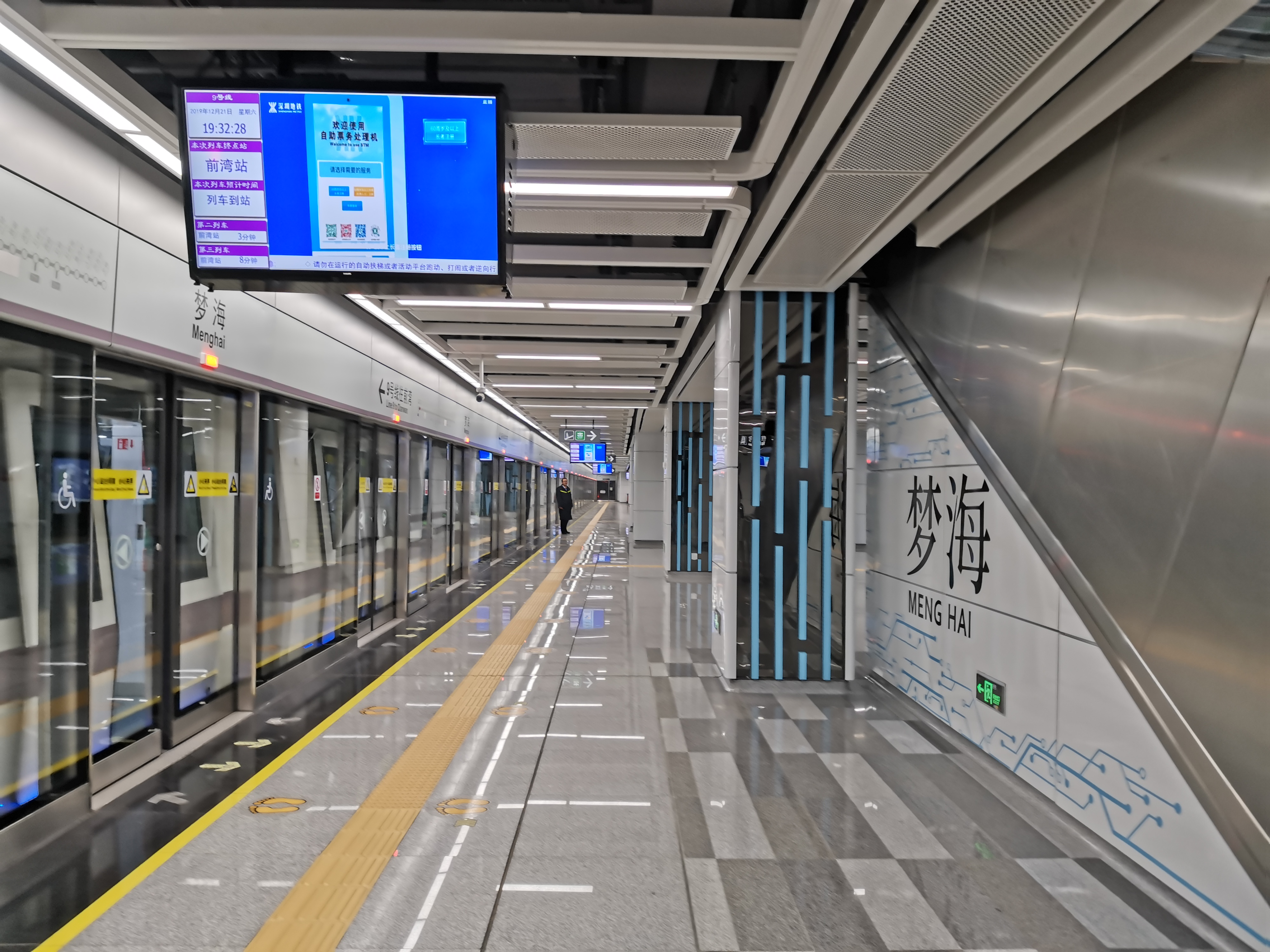

General information
- Location: Nanshan District, Shenzhen, Guangdong; China
- Operator: SZMC (Shenzhen Metro Group)
- Line: Line 9

History
- Opened: 8 December 2019

Services
Preceding station	Shenzhen Metro	Following station
Yihai towards Wenjin	Line 9	Qianwan Terminus
Location

Menghai station (simplified Chinese: 梦海站; traditional Chinese: 夢海站; pinyin: Mènghǎi Zhàn; Jyutping: mung6 hoi2 zaam6) is a metro station of Shenzhen Metro Line 9. It opened on 8 December 2019.

== Station layout ==
G	-	Exit
B1F; Concourse	Lobby	Customer Service, Shops, Vending machines, ATMs
B2F; Platforms	Platform 1	← Line 9 towards Qianwan (Terminus)
B2F; Platforms	Island platform, doors will open on the left
B2F; Platforms	Platform 2	→ Line 9 towards Wenjin (Yihai) →

== Exits ==
Exit	Destination
Exit C	East Side of Menghai Boulevard, Qianhai Chow Tai Fook Shopping Mall
Exit D	West Side of Menghai Boulevard
