= Yihai station =

Metro station in Shenzhen, China

Coordinates: 22°31′46″N 113°59′6″E

Yihai 怡海
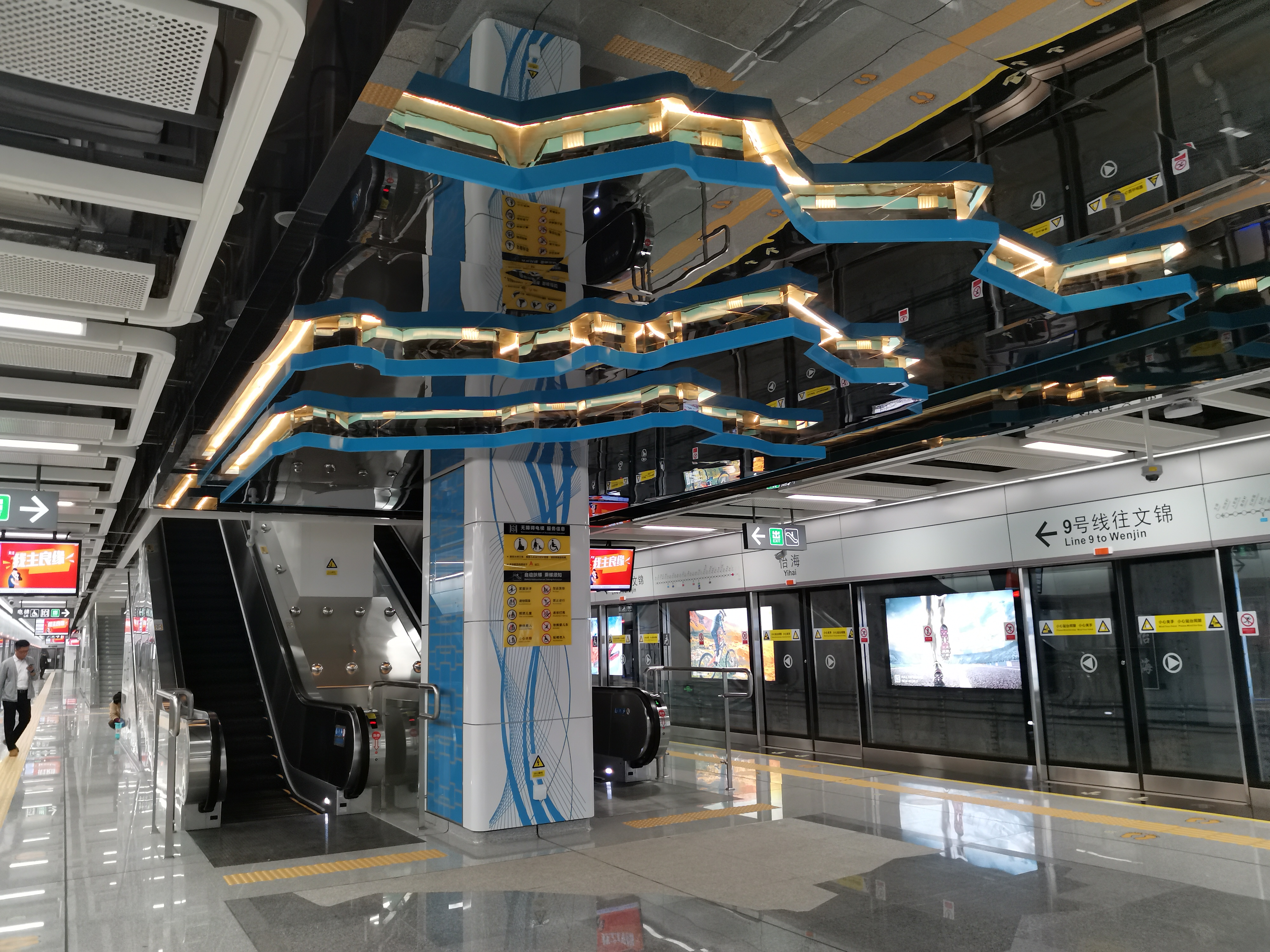

General information
- Location: Nanshan District, Shenzhen, Guangdong; China
- Operator: SZMC (Shenzhen Metro Group)
- Line: Line 9

History
- Opened: 8 December 2019

Services
Preceding station	Shenzhen Metro	Following station
Litchi Orchards towards Wenjin	Line 9	Menghai towards Qianwan
Location

Yihai station (Chinese: 怡海站; pinyin: Yíhǎi Zhàn; Jyutping: ji4 hoi2 zaam6) is a metro station of Shenzhen Metro Line 9. It opened on 8 December 2019.

== Station layout ==
G	-	Exit
B1F; Concourse	Lobby	Customer Service, Shops, Vending machines, ATMs
B2F; Platforms	Platform	← Line 9 towards Qianwan (Menghai)
B2F; Platforms	Island platform, doors will open on the left
B2F; Platforms	Platform	→ Line 9 towards Wenjin (Litchi Orchards) →

== Exits ==
Exit	Destination
Exit A	East Side of Yihai Boulevard (S), Qianhai Enterprise Residence
Exit C	West Side of Liyumen 2nd street, Qianhai Exhibition Hall
