= Lists of schools in Shenzhen =

These are lists of schools in Shenzhen.

== By district ==
- List of schools in Bao'an District
- List of schools in Futian District
- List of schools in Guangming District
- List of schools in Longgang District, Shenzhen (does not include schools in Dapeng New District)
- List of schools in Longhua District, Shenzhen
- List of schools in Luohu District
- List of schools in Nanshan District, Shenzhen
- List of schools in Pingshan District, Shenzhen
- List of schools in Yantian District

Dapeng New District schools are listed in that article.

== By type ==
=== List of municipal schools ===
- The Affiliated High School of Shenzhen University (深圳大学师范学院附属中学) - Affiliated with Shenzhen University
- The First Vocational Technical School of Shenzhen (深圳市第一职业技术学校)
- Shenzhen No. 2 Experimental School (深圳市第二实验学校)
- Shenzhen No. 2 Vocational School of Technology (深圳市第二职业技术学校)
- Shenzhen No. 3 Senior High School (深圳市第三高级中学)
- Shenzhen No. 7 Senior High School (深圳市第七高级中学)
- Shenzhen Arts School (深圳艺术学校)
- Shenzhen Experimental School
- Shenzhen Foreign Languages School
- Shenzhen Institute of Technology (深圳技师学院)
- Shenzhen Middle School
- Shenzhen Pengcheng Technical College (深圳鹏城技师学院), previously Shenzhen Second Senior Technical School (深圳市技工学校)
- Shenzhen High School of Science (深圳科学高中)
- Shenzhen Primary School (深圳小学)
- Shenzhen Second Foreign Languages School (深圳第二外国语学校)
- Shenzhen Second Senior High School (深圳市第二高级中学)
- Shenzhen Senior High School
- Shenzhen Sports School (深圳体育运动学校)
- Shenzhen Yuanping Special Education School (深圳元平特殊教育学校)
- Shenzhen Yuxin School (深圳市育新学校), previously known as the Shenzhen Work-Study School

=== List of district-operated schools ===
Please consult the "By district" section above and select the relevant district.

=== List of international schools ===
International schools in the city designated as for children of foreign workers include:

- Shenzhen American International School
- Shekou International School
- Shenzhen Japanese School
- QSI International School of Shenzhen
- International School of Nanshan Shenzhen
- Korean International School in Shenzhen
- BASIS International School Shenzhen
- Bromsgrove-Mission Hills International School of Shenzhen

The Guangdong provincial government approved BASIS and Bromsgrove-Mission Hills while the Shenzhen municipal government approved the other six.

Other international schools:

- C-UK College Shenzhen
- Green Oasis School
- Shenzhen Academy of International Education
- Shenzhen College of International Education
- Shen Wai International School
- Vanke Meisha Academy
- Formerly: École Française Internationale de Shenzhen (partnered with the Agency for French Education Abroad)

== See also ==
- Education in Shenzhen
