= List of schools in Nanshan District, Shenzhen =

This is a list of schools in Nanshan District, Shenzhen.

== Shenzhen municipal schools ==
Schools in Nanshan District under the municipal government include:

- Shenzhen Experimental School - Nanshan District campuses include:
  - Full boarding high school department
- The Affiliated High School of Shenzhen University (深圳大学师范学院附属中学) - Affiliated with Shenzhen University
- Shenzhen Second Senior High School (深圳市第二高级中学) - Xili

== Nanshan district schools ==
=== Secondary schools ===
Secondary schools (simplified Chinese: 中学; traditional Chinese: 中學; pinyin: Zhōngxué; Jyutping: zung1 hok6) governed by Nanshan District include:

- Nanshan Middle School Attached to Beijing Normal University (Note: 北京师范大学南山附属学校中学部; 北京師範大學南山附屬學校中學部; Běijīng Shīfàn Dàxué Nánshān fùshǔ Xuéxiào Zhōngxuébù; bak1 ging1 si1 faan6 daai6 hok6 naam4 saan1 fu6 suk6 hok6 haau6 zung1 hok6 bou6) - Affiliated with Beijing Normal University
- Shenzhen Bolun Vocational and Technical School (Note: 深圳市博伦职业技术学校; 深圳市博倫職業技術學校; Shēnzhènshì Bólún Zhíyè Jìshùxuéxiào; sam1 zan3 si5 bok3 leon4 zik1 jip6 gei6 seot6 hok6 haau6)
- Shenzhen Nanshan Experimental Education Group (Note: 深圳市南山实验教育集团; 深圳市南山實驗教育集團; Shēnzhènshì Nánshān Shíyàn Jiàoyù Jítuán; sam1 zan3 si5 naam4 saan1 sat6 jim6 gaau3 juk6 zaap6 tyun4)
  - Nanhai Middle School (南海中学)
  - Qilin Middle School (麒麟中学)
- Shenzhen Nanshan Foreign Language School (Group) (Note: 深圳市南山外国语学校（集团）; 深圳南山外國語學校（集團）; Shēnzhènshì Nánshān Wàiguóyǔ Xuéxiào (Jítuán); sam1 zan3 si5 naam4 saan1 ngoi6 gwok3 jyu5 hok6 haau6 (zaap6 tyun4))
  - Binhai Middle School (滨海中学)
  - Gaoxin Middle School (高新中学)
  - Taoyuan Middle School (桃源中学)
  - High School (高级中学)
- Second Foreign Language School of Nanshan (Group) (Note: 深圳市南山区第二外国语学校（集团）; 深圳南山區第二外國語學校（集團）; Shēnzhènshì Nánshānqū Dì'èr Wàiguóyǔ Xuéxiào (Jítuán); sam1 zan3 si5 naam4 saan1 keoi1 dai6 ji6 ngoi6 gwok3 jyu5 hok6 haau6 (zaap6 tyun4))
  - Xuefu Middle School (学府中学)
- Shenzhen Shekou Yucai Education Group (Note: 深圳市蛇口育才教育集团; 深圳市蛇口育才教育集團; Shēnzhènshì Nánshānqū Dì'èr Wàiguóyǔ Xuéxiào (Jítuán); sam1 zan3 si5 se4 hau2 juk6 coi4 gaau3 juk6 zaap6 tyun4)
  - Yucai High School
  - Yucai No.2 Middle School
  - Yucai No.3 Middle School
- Shenzhen Nanshan OCT High School (Note: 深圳市南山区华侨城中学; 深圳市南山區華僑城中學; Shēnzhènshì Nánshānqū Huáqiáochéng Zhōngxué; sam1 zan3 si5 naam4 saan1 keoi1 waa4 kiu4 sing4 zung1 hok6)
  - OCT Campus (侨城初中部)
  - Shenwan Campus (深圳湾部)
- Shenzhen Nantou High School (Note: 深圳市南头中学; 深圳市南頭中學; Shēnzhènshì Nántóu Zhōngxué; sam1 zan3 si5 naam4 tau4 zung1 hok6)

=== Nine-year schools ===
Nine-year schools (九年一贯制学校; 九年一貫制學校; Jiǔnián Yīguànzhì Xuéxiào; gau2 nin4 jat1 gun3 zai3 hok6 haau6) include:

- Shenzhen Nanshan Taiziwan School (深圳市南山区太子湾学校)
- Shenzhen Nanshan Lixiang School (深圳市南山区荔香学校)
- Shenzhen Nanshan Shekou School (深圳市南山区蛇口学校)
- Shenzhen Nanshan Experimental Education Group
  - Qianhai Gangwan School (前海港湾学校)
  - Yuanding School (园丁学校)
- Shenzhen Nanshan Foreign Language School (Group)
  - Dachong School (大冲学校)
  - Kehua School (科华学校)
  - Wenhua School (文华学校)
- Shenzhen Nanshan Songping School (深圳市南山区松坪学校)
- Shenzhen Nanshan Qianhai School (深圳市南山区前海学校)
- Shenzhen Nanshan Second Experimental School (深圳市南山区第二实验学校)
- Shenzhen Nanshan Tongle School (同乐学校)
- Shenzhen Nanshan Second Foreign Languages School (Group) (深圳市南山区第二外国语学校（集团）)
  - Haide School (海德学校)
- Nanshan Shekou Yucai Education Group (深圳市南山区蛇口育才教育集团)
  - Longzhu School (龙珠学校)
- Shenzhen Nanshan Chiwan School (深圳市南山区赤湾学校)
- Experimental School of Harbin Institute of Technology in Nanshan, Shenzhen (深圳市南山区哈工大（深圳）实验学校)
- Shenzhen University Town Lihu Experimental School (深圳市南山区深圳大学城丽湖实验学校)
- Shenzhen Nanshan Wenli Experimental School (Group) (深圳市南山区文理实验学校（集团）)
  - Kechuang School (科创学校)
  - Wenli Experimental School (文理实验学校)
- Shenzhen Nanshan Shenzhen Bay School (深圳市南山区深圳湾学校)
- The Experimental School of Shenzhen Institute of Advanced Technology (深圳市南山区中国科学院深圳先进技术研究院实验学校
- Shenzhen Middle School Nanshan Innovation School (深圳市深中南山创新学校)
- Longyuan School (龙苑学校)

=== Primary schools ===
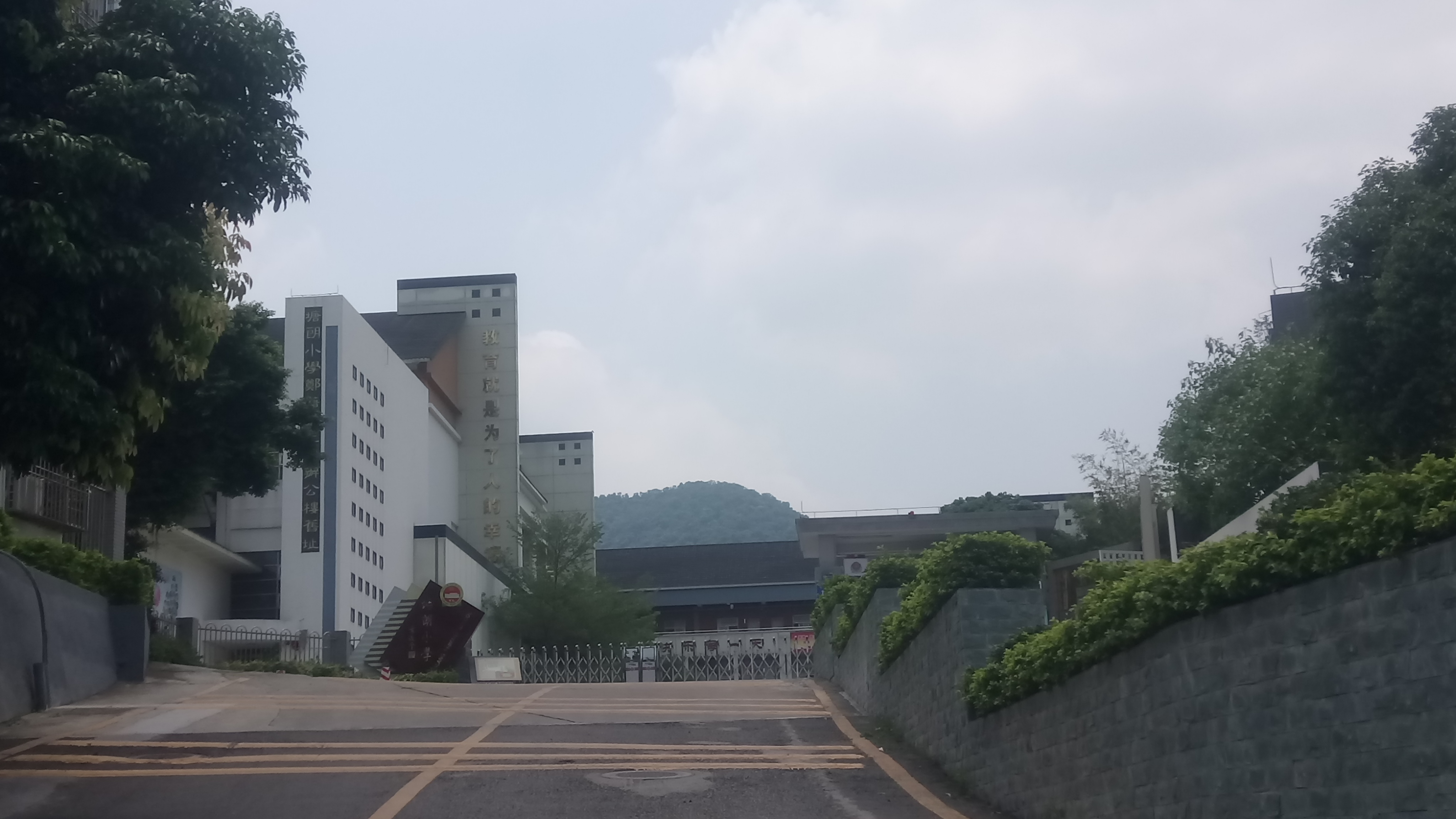
Tanglang Primary School

District primary schools include:

- Shenzhen Nanshan Experimental Education Group
  - Dingtai Primary School (鼎太小学)
  - Lilin Primary School (荔林小学)
  - Liwan Primary School (荔湾小学)
  - Nantou Primary School (南头小学)
  - Qilin Primary School (麒麟小学)
- Shenzhen Shekou Yucai Education Group
  - Yucai No.1 Primary School (育才一小)
  - Yucai No.2 Primary School (育才二小)
  - Yucai No.3 Primary School (育才三小)
  - Yucai No.4 Primary School (育才四小)
- Primary School of Nanshan School Attached to Beijing Normal University (北京师范大学南山附属学校小学部)
- Shenzhen Nanshan Qianhai Gangwan Primary School (深圳市南山区前海港湾小学)
- Shenzhen Nanshan Foreign Language School (Group)
  - Binhai Primary School (滨海小学)
  - Keyuan Primary School (科苑小学)
- Shenzhen Nanshan Second Foreign Language School (Group) (深圳市南山区第二外国语学校（集团）)
  - Dakan Primary School (大磡小学)
  - Hai'an Primary School (海岸小学)
  - Pingshan Primary School (平山小学)
  - Xuefu No.1 Primary School (学府一小)
  - Xuefu No.2 Primary School (学府二小)
- Shenzhen Nanshan Wenli Experimental School Group (深圳市南山区文理实验学校（集团）)
  - No.1 Primary School (文理一小)
  - No.2 Primary School (文理二小)
- Shenzhen OCT Primary School (深圳市南山区华侨城小学)
- Shenzhen Nanshan Nanyou Primary School (深圳市南山区南油小学)
- Shenzhen Nanhai Primary School (深圳市南山区南海小学)
- Shenzhen University Town Xili Experimental Primary School (深圳市南山区大学城西丽实验小学)
- Shenzhen Nanshan Primary School (深圳市南山区南山小学)
- Shenzhen Xiangnan Primary School (深圳市南山区向南小学)
- Shenzhen Haibin Experimental Primary School (深圳市南山区海滨实验小学)
  - Shenzhen Bay Campus (深圳湾部)
  - Yukang Campus (愉康部)
- Shenzhen Nanshan Zhuguang Primary School (深圳市南山区珠光小学)
- Nanshan Songping Second Primary School (深圳市南山区松坪第二小学)
- Shenzhen Nantou Cheng Primary School (深圳市南山区南头城小学)
- Shenzhen Nanshan Daxin Primary School (深圳市南山区大新小学)
- Shenzhen Qianhai Primary School (深圳市南山区前海小学)
- Shenzhen Nanshan Experimental Education Group (深圳市南山区南山实验教育集团) Baimang Primary School (白芒小学)
- Shenzhen University Normal College Affiliated Houhai Primary School (深圳市南山区深圳大学师范学院附属后海小学 广东省深圳市南山区后海大道2142号
- Shenzhen Nanshan Shahe Primary School (深圳市南山区沙河小学)
- Shenzhen Nanshan Taoyuan Primary School (深圳市南山区桃源小学)
- Shenzhen Nanshan Yueliangwan Primary School (深圳市南山区月亮湾小学)
- Shenzhen Nanshan Zhuoya Primary School (深圳市南山区卓雅小学)
- Shenzhen Nanshan Yangguang Primary School (深圳市南山区阳光小学)
- Southern University of Science and Technology (SUSTech) Experimental Group (Note: 南方科技大学教育集团(南山); 南方科技大學教育集團(南山); Nánfāng Kējì Dàxué Jiàoyù Jítuán (Nánshān); naam4 fong1 fo1 gei6 daai6 hok6 gaau3 juk6 zaap6 tyun4 (naam4 saan1))
  - (Nanshan) No.1 Primary School (实验一小)
  - (Nanshan) No.2 Primary School (第二实验学校)
  - Tanglang Primary School (塘朗小学/塘朗小學)
- Shenzhen University Affiliated Experimental Primary School (深圳大学附属教育集团实验小学)
- Xiangshanli Primary School (深圳市南山区香山里小学)

== International and private schools ==
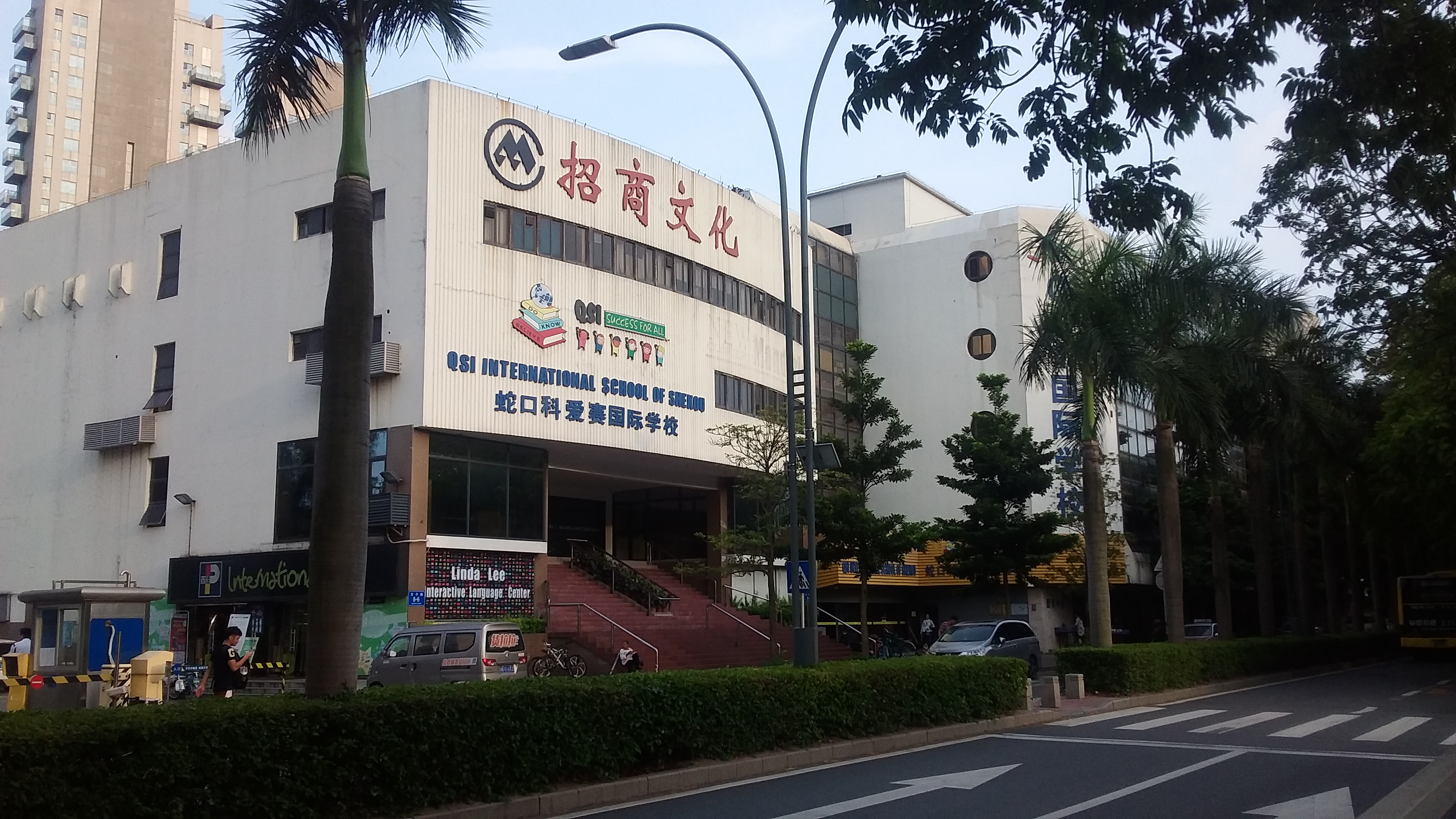
QSI International School of Shenzhen

There are four Anglophone international high schools and private high schools in Nanshan. Several of these high schools all offer British, University of Cambridge International A-Level or North American style curricula, with English as the main language of instruction. There are also Japanese and South Korean-style schools.

Schools for children of foreign workers (外籍人员子女学校; 外籍人員子女學校; Wàijí Rényuán Zǐnǚ Xuéxiào; ngoi6 zik6 jan4 jyun4 zi2 neoi5 hok6 haau6) include:

- BASIS International School Shenzhen (Note: 深圳贝赛思国际学校; 深圳貝賽思國際學校; Shēnzhèn Bèisàisī Guójì Xuéxiào; sam1 zan3 bui3 coi3 si1 gwok3 zai3 hok6 haau6) - Part of the Basis Educational Group
- The International School of Nanshan Shenzhen (K-12)
- KIS Korean International School of Shenzhen (K-12, has a Korean section and an English elementary section)
- QSI International School of Shekou (K-12)
- Shekou International School (K-12)
- Shenzhen American International School (PK-8)
- Shenzhen Japanese School (grades 1-8)

Other schools with foreign educational systems:

- Shenzhen Nanshan Chinese International College (formerly Nanshan Bilingual School/Baishizhou Bilingual School) (Note: 南山中英文学校; 南山中英文學校; Nánshān Zhōngyīngwén Xuéxiào; naam4 saan1 zung1 jing1 man4 hok6 haau6)
- Shen Wai International School - International division of Shenzhen Foreign Languages School, caters to children with foreign, Republic of China on Taiwan, and Hong Kong and Macau passports
- École Française Internationale de Shenzhen (partnered with the Agency for French Education Abroad)

Other private schools:

- Shenzhen Dalton Xinhua School (Note: 深圳道尔顿新华公学; 深圳道爾頓新華公學; Shēnzhèn Dào'ěrdùn Xīnhuá Gōngxué) - K-12
