= Too Young to Grow Old =

2025 Chinese television series

- Genre: Drama; Youth
- Based on: To Us, From Us (Chinese: 再见十八班)
- Written by: Lanxin Yu; Yini Fang; Yujie Li; Zhuohui Zhang
- Directed by: Lanxin Yu; Aaron Hu
- Starring: Yi Da Qian; Deng Meng (Scarlett); Xiong Jing Wen; Wu Chong Xuan; Chen Ming Hao; Zhu Ran; Bai Yu Fei; Lin Chen Han; Lu Zhan Xiang
- Country of origin: China
- Original language: Mandarin
- No. of seasons: 1
- No. of episodes: 24

Production
- Production locations: Shenzhen, China
- Production company: WuTong Films

Original release
- Network: iQIYI
- Release: 22 January 2025 – 2025

Too Young to Grow Old (Chinese: 再见十八班) is a Chinese television series that premiered on iQIYI in China on 22 January 2025. It is set in Shenzhen primarily at the Shenzhen Foreign Languages School Longgang Branch (深圳外国语学校龙岗分校). Too Young to Grow Old was supported by the Cultural Development Fund of Longgang District, Shenzhen. On January 12, 2026, the series was selected as an 'Excellent Work' by the National Radio and Television Administration in its list of outstanding online audio-visual works for the third quarter of 2025.

== Synopsis ==
Former delinquent Song Chen, inspired by his high school mentor, determined to become a teacher and change the fate of struggling students. However, during his internship, he is unexpectedly assigned as the teacher of Class 1, a class full of top students. Meanwhile, the mentor's daughter, Tan Shu Tong, a hot-tempered high achiever, who holds deep resentment toward teachers. After failing her job search, she unwillingly returns to high school and becomes the teacher of Class 18, a group of underachievers.

== Cast ==
- Yi Da Qian as Song Chen
- Deng Meng as Tan Shu Tong
- Xiong Jing Wen as Qin Miao Miao
- Wu Chong Xuan as Chen Jia Wei
- Chen Ming Hao as Lin Hao Ran
- Zhu Ran as Jing Xuan
- Bai Yu Fei as Wu Di
- Lin Chen han as Zhong Wan Zhen
- Lu Zhan Xiang as Ren Yi

== Music ==
Music producer Fansheng Gao is the main songwriter for the series. Gao, a former student of Shenzhen Foreign Languages School, had a live screening event in January 2025.

Original Soundtrack
| No. | Title | Credits | Length |
|---|---|---|---|
| 1. | ""Brilliant Fireworks" (灿烂烟火)" | Composer, lyricist: Fansheng Gao |
| 2. | ""Awakening" (唤醒)" | Composer, lyricist: Fansheng Gao |
| 3. | ""Let Me Meet You" (让我遇见你)" | Composer, lyricist: Fansheng Gao |
| 4. | ""Symphony of Memories" (回忆交响曲)" | Composer, lyricist: Fansheng Gao |
| 5. | ""So Sad to Say Goodbye"" | Composer: Roxanne Seeman, Alyssia Eunike Soetedjo; Lyricist: Roxanne Seeman |
