= Lanxin Yu =

Chinese screenwriter and film director

- Born: May 22, 1994 (age 32); Shenzhen
- Other name: Mandy Yu
- Years active: 2014–present
- Awards: Golden Rooster Awards – Best Children Movie Category; 2021 Let Life Be Beautiful

Chinese name
- Traditional Chinese: 禹蘭馨
- Simplified Chinese: 禹岚馨
Transcriptions

Lanxin Yu (Chinese: 禹岚馨, born 22 May 1994) is a Chinese screenwriter and film director. She is best known for her youth movies To Us, From Us, Let Life Be Beautiful and Too Young To Grow Old.

== Early life and education ==
Yu Lanxin was born in Shenzhen, Guangdong Province. She attended high school at Shenzhen Foreign Languages School graduating 2012. During her high school years, she was the manager of the podcast center, and in her senior year, she won the English-speaking interview competition for broadcast host of the Central Broadcasting System out of 20 girls competing nationwide.

In 2016, Yu graduated at Tsinghua University with a BA from the School of Economics and Management. In 2019, Yu graduated from the University of Southern California Film School with a master's degree in film production.

== Career ==
In 2014, while at Tsinghua University, Yu wrote and directed Sail, the Summer Winds. With support form the local government and Shenzhen Foreign Language School, she was able to film her youth drama which had a very limited budget for cast, crew and production. While writing the script, Yu received an offer from a production company to make the movie, buying her script with Yu directing it, but declined preferring to keep creative control and take it on herself.

In 2018, she wrote and directed To Us, From Us, a story adapted from her personal experience and real events. The lead character Tan Ruiming, was inspire by her teacher Tang Ruiguang, an outstanding faculty member in the high school department of Shenzhen Foreign Languages School. The movie tells the story of how an honorable and inspiring teacher of excellence can influence a student's life. To Us, From Us was released on iQIYI streaming digitally. Views exceeded 2 million in the first week with an 8.2 rating on Douban.

In 2020, Yu's screenplay Let Life Be Beautiful was directed by Lin Ziping, starring Liu Mintao, Tan Kai, and Rong Zishan. The story was inspired by the true story of a young man whose pursuit of writing, recording and performing music kept him alive while suffering from leukemia. It was produced by iQIYI, and released October 5 in mainland China. The movie featured "Missing a Wasted Name" perform by Chen Chusheng, the promotion song "Wings" performed by Xie Keyin from girl group TheNine, among others.

In 2023, after four years in development, a launch event for the commencement of production for Yu's TV series, Too Young To Grow Old, the spinoff of To Us, From Us was held in Longgang District, Shenzhen. The 24-episode series follows the lives of the new generation of youth in Shenzhen, with filming taking place in Longgang, Shenzhen Wutong Project Pictures and Yingchuan Culture are co-producers.

On January 22, 2025, Too Young To Grow Old, written and directly by Yu, premiered on iQIYI.

== Recognition ==
- 18th DC APA Film Festival, Shortlist, "One Period, One Meeting", US, 2018
- Golden Rooster Award, Best Children's Film, "Let Life Be Beautiful", 2019
