= List of schools in Bao'an District =

This is a list of schools in Bao'an District, Shenzhen.

== Shenzhen municipal schools ==
Schools operated by the Shenzhen municipal government in Bao'an District include:

- Shenzhen No. 7 Senior High School (深圳市第七高级中学) - Shajing Subdistrict

== Bao'an district schools ==
=== Twelve-year schools ===
- Shenzhen Bao'an Cambridge International Institute (深圳市宝安区康桥书院) - Jiuwei Community, Xixiang Sub-district
- Shenzhen Bao'an Fanshen Experimental School (深圳市宝安区翻身实验学校) - Includes East Campus in Xin'an Sub-district and West Campus in Tangwei Community, Fuhai Sub-district
- Shenzhen Bao'an Mingde Foreign Language Experimental School (深圳市宝安区明德外语实验学校) - Shajing Sub-district
- Shenzhen Bao'an Songgang Chinese and English Experimental School (深圳市宝安区松岗中英文实验学校) - Songgang Village, Songgang Sub-district
- Shenzhen Fuyuan School (深圳市富源学校) - Fuyuan Education Town, Jiuwei, Xixiang Sub-district
- Shenzhen Huasheng Experimental School (深圳市华胜实验学校) - Sanwei, Xixiang
- Shenzhen Jueqi Experimental Middle School (深圳市崛起实验中学) - Zone 82, Baocheng
- Shenzhen Oriental English College (深圳东方英文书院) - Education Town
- Shenzhen ShiYan Public School (深圳市石岩公学) - Shiyan Sub-district
- Shenzhen Taoyuan ARCADIA Grammar School (深圳桃源居中澳实验学校) - Xixiang

=== Secondary schools ===
- Jieren Senior High School (杰仁高中)
- Shenzhen Bao'an High School (深圳市宝安中学)
- Shenzhen Fuyong Middle School (深圳市宝安区福永中学) - Fuyong Sub-district
- Shenzhen Haibin Middle School (深圳市海滨中学) - Zone 41
- Shenzhen Shajing Middle School (深圳市宝安区沙井中学) - Shajing Sub-district
- Shenzhen Xin'an Middle School (Group) (深圳市新安中学(集团) ) - Includes a junior section in Baocheng, a senior high school at Bao'an Central District, the No.1 Experimental School at Xin'an Sub-district, and the No. 2 Foreign Language School in Fuyong Sub-district
- Shenzhen Xixiang Middle School (深圳市西乡中学) - Includes a junior school in Xixiang Sub-district and a separate high school
- Songgang Middle School (松岗中学) - Songgang Subdistrict

=== Vocational schools ===
- Bao'an Vocational and Technical School (宝安职业技术学校) - Lijin Community, Hangcheng Subdistrict
- The Second Campus of Bao'an Vocational Education Group (深圳市宝安职业教育集团第二校区) - Shajing Sub-district

=== Nine-year schools ===
- Bao'an Experimental School (宝安实验学校) - N8 Zone, New Central Area
- Bao'an Middle School (Group) No. 2 Foreign Language School (宝安中学（集团）第二外国语学校) - Shajing Sub-district
- Bao'an Middle School (Group) Tangtou School (宝安中学（集团）塘头学校) - Tangtou Community, Shiyan Sub-district
- China-UK College (深圳市宝安区中英公学) - Xixiang
- Dongsheng Experimental School (东升实验学校) - Songgang Subdistrict
- Fenghuang School (凤凰学校) - Tianluoshan, Fenghuang Community, Fuyong Subdistrict
- Huangmabu School (黄麻布学校) - Huangmabu Community, Xixiang Subdistrict
- Huayi Experimental School (华一实验学校) - Xinqiao Subdistrict
- Jinbi Experimental School (金碧实验学校)
- Jinyuan School (金源学校) - Wanfeng, Shajing Sub-district
- Penghui Chinese-English School (鹏晖中英文学校) - Xinhe Community, Fuyong Subdistrict
- Ronggen School (荣根学校) - Shajing Subdistrict
- Shenzhen Bao'an Baohua School (深圳市宝安区宝华学校) - Shajing Sub-district
- Shenzhen Bao'an Baolong School (深圳市宝安区宝龙学校) - Zone 33, Xin'an Sub-district
- Shenzhen Bao'an Beiting Experimental School (深圳市宝安区北亭实验学校) - Houting Village, Shajing Town
- Shenzhen Bao'an Biaoshang School (深圳市宝安区标尚学校) - Yanchuan, Songgang Sub-district
- Shenzhen Bao'an District Bitou Wenwu School (深圳市宝安区碧头文武学校小学) - Bitou No.2 Industrial Area, Songgang
- Shenzhen Bao'an Chongwen School (深圳市宝安区崇文学校) - Jiangbian Community, Songgang Sub-district
- Shenzhen Bao'an Fumin School (深圳市宝安区福民学校) - East Zone, Baishixia, Fuyong Sub-district
- Shenzhen Bao'an Guanhua Yucai School (深圳市宝安区冠华育才学校) - Zone 27
- Shenzhen Bao'an Guanqun Experimental School (深圳市宝安区冠群实验学校) - Shajing Sub-district
- Shenzhen Bao'an Guantian School (深圳市宝安区官田学校) - Shiyan Sub-district
- Shenzhen Bao'an Haiwang School (深圳市宝安区海旺学校) - Zone N5, Bao'an CBD
- Shenzhen Bao'an Hangcheng School (深圳市宝安区航城学校) - Xixiang Sub-district
- Shenzhen Bao'an Heping Chinese-English Experimental School Junior Section (深圳市宝安区和平中英文实验学校初中) - Tongyi New Village, Heping Community, Fuyong Sub-district
- Shenzhen Bao'an Hezhou School (深圳市宝安区鹤洲学校) - Hezhou Community, Xixiang Sub-district
- Shenzhen Bao'an Huawen School (深圳市宝安区华文学校) - Huangtian, Xixiang Sub-district
- Shenzhen Bao'an Huayuan School (深圳市宝安区华源学校) - Songgang Sub-district
- Shenzhen Bao'an Jingshan Experimental School (深圳市宝安区景山实验学校) - Fuhai Sub-district
- Shenzhen Bao'an Jueqi Chengxin Experimental School (深圳市宝安区崛起诚信实验学校)
- Shenzhen Bao'an Liaokeng School (深圳市宝安区料坑学校) - Liaokeng New Village, Shiyan Subdistrict
- Shenzhen Bao'an Licai Experimental School (深圳市宝安区立才实验学校) - Shajing
- Shenzhen Bao'an Longshan School (深圳市宝安区龙山学校) - Fenghuanggang Village, Xixiang Sub-district
- Shenzhen Bao'an Ningyuan Experimental School (深圳市宝安区宁远实验学校) - Luozu Community, Shiyan Subdistrict
- Shenzhen Bao'an Qiaotou School (深圳市宝安区桥头学校)
- Shenzhen Bao'an Qiaoxing School (深圳市宝安区桥兴学校) - Qiaoxing Community, Fuyong Sub-district
- Shenzhen Bao'an Shajing Caihua School (深圳市宝安区沙井才华学校) - Shajing Sub-district
- Shenzhen Bao'an Shajing Dongshan School (深圳市宝安区沙井东山书院) - Houting, Shajing Sub-district
- Shenzhen Bao'an Shajing Shangnan School (深圳市宝安区沙井上南学校) - Shangnan Industrial Area, Shangjing
- Shenzhen Bao'an South China Chinese-English School (深圳市宝安区华南中英文学校) - Shajing Sub-district
- Shenzhen Bao'an Tangwei Wanli School (深圳市宝安区塘尾万里学校) - Tangwei Community, Fuyong Sub-district
- Shenzhen Bao'an Taoyuan Chinese and English Experimental School (深圳市宝安区陶园中英文实验学校) - Songgang Sub-district
- Shenzhen Bao'an Xinxing School (深圳市宝安区信兴学校) - Xinxing Company, Gushu Community, Xixiang Sub-district
- Shenzhen Bao'an Yonglian School (深圳市宝安区永联学校) - Shuikou Garden, Zone 31, Xincheng
- Shenzhen Bao'an Yucai School (深圳市宝安区育才学校) - Yingrenshi Village, Shiyan Subdistrict
- Shenzhen Bao'an Zhenhua School (深圳市宝安区振华学校) - Zone 31
- Shenzhen Xin'an Middle School (Group) No.1 Experimental School (深圳市新安中学（集团）第一实验学校) - Bao'an Central District
- Yanshan School of Shenzhen (深圳市宝安区燕山学校) - Yanchuan Community, Songgang Sub-district
- Shuitian Experimental School (水田实验学校) - Zone 8, Shuitian New Village, Shiyan Subdistrict
- Wenhui School (文汇学校)
- Xin'an Dongshan School (新安东山书院) - Zone 50
- Zhenxing School (振兴学校) - Guanghaofeng Industrial Area, Gushu, Xixiang

=== Primary schools ===
- Baomin Primary School (宝民小学)
- Gongle Primary School (共乐小学) - Baolian New Village, Gongle Village, Xixiang Subdistrict
- Haigang Primary School (海港小学) - Xixiang Subdistrict
- Haicheng Primary School (海城小学) - Qiancheng Binhai Garden
- Jingbei Primary School (径贝小学) - Jingbei Community, Xixiang Subdistrict
- Shenzhen Anle Primary School (深圳市宝安区安乐小学) - Zone 43, Baocheng
- Shenzhen Bao'an Primary School (深圳市宝安区宝安小学)
- Shenzhen Bao'an Binhai Primary School (深圳市宝安区滨海小学) - Bao'an CBD
- Shenzhen Bao'an Blue Sea Primary School (深圳市宝安区西乡碧海小学) - Xixiang Subdistrict
- Shenzhen Bao'an Foreign Language School (深圳市宝安外国语学校) - Zone 20, Baocheng
- Shenzhen Bao'an Fuyong Primary School (深圳市宝安区福永小学) - Fuyong Subdistrict
- Shenzhen Bao'an Fuyong Fuxin Primary School (深圳市宝安区福永街道福新小学) - Xinhe Community, Fuyong Subdistrict
- Shenzhen Bao'an Fuyong Fuxing Primary School (深圳市宝安区福永福兴小学) - Baishixia, Fuyong Sub-district
- Shenzhen Bao'an Fuyong Xingwei Elementary School (深圳市宝安区福永街道兴围小学) - Xingwei Community, Fuyong Subdistrict
- Shenzhen Bao'an Haoye Primary School (深圳市宝安区蚝业小学) - Shajing Subdistrict
- Shenzhen Bao'an Houde Primary School (深圳市宝安区厚德小学) - Shangliao, Shajing Subdistrict
- Shenzhen Bao'an Huayu Chinese and English Primary School (深圳市宝安区化雨中英文小学) - Tangxiachong, Songgang Subdistrict
- Shenzhen Bao'an Jian'an Primary School (深圳市宝安区新安街道建安小学) - Baocheng
- Shenzhen Bao'an Lingzhi Primary School (灵芝小学) - Zone 22
- Shenzhen Bao'an Luozu Primary School (深圳市宝安区罗租小学) - Luozu Community, Shiyan Subdistrict
- Shenzhen Bao'an Luxing Primary School (深圳市宝安区陆兴小学) - Building C4
- Shenzhen Bao'an Pingzhou Primary School (坪洲小学)
- Shenzhen Bao'an Shajing Bogang Primary School (深圳市宝安区壆岗小学) - Bogang Community, Shajing Subdistrict
- Shenzhen Bao'an Shajing Xinqiao Primary School (深圳市宝安区沙井街道新桥小学) - Shajing Subdistrict
- Shenzhen Bao'an Shangwu Primary School (深圳市宝安区上屋小学) - Shiyan Subdistrict
- Shenzhen Bao'an Shaxi Primary School (深圳市宝安区沙溪小学) - Songgang Sub-district
- Shenzhen Bao'an Songgang No.1 Primary School (深圳市宝安区松岗第一小学)
- Shenzhen Bao'an Songgang No.2 Primary School (松岗第二小学) - Songgang Subdistrict
- Shenzhen Bao'an Songgang Dongfang Primary School (深圳市宝安区松岗街道东方小学) - Songgang
- Shenzhen Bao'an Songgang Tantou Primary School (深圳市宝安区松岗街道潭头小学) - Tantou, Songgang Subdistrict
- Shenzhen Bao'an Songgang Zhiyuan Primary School (深圳市宝安区智园小学) - Gongle Community, Xixiang Sub-district
- Shenzhen Bao'an Wanfeng Primary School (深圳市宝安区万丰小学) - Shajing Subdistrict
- Shenzhen Bao'an Weimin Primary School (深圳市宝安区为民小学) - Shiyan Subdistrict
- Shenzhen Bao'an Xiashiwei Primary School (深圳市宝安区下十围小学) - Fuwei Community, Fuyong Subdistrict
- Shenzhen Bao'an Xin'an Fanshen Primary School (翻身小学) - Zone 47
- Shenzhen Bao'an Xin'anhu Primary School (深圳市宝安区新安街道新安湖小学) - Zone 8
- Shenzhen Bao'an Xinfeng Primary School (深圳市宝安区新丰小学)
- Shenzhen Bao'an Xinqiao Huangpu Primary School (深圳市宝安区新桥街道黄埔小学) - Huangpu Neighbourhood Committee, Xinqiao Subdistrict
- Shenzhen Bao'an Xinxin Primary School (深圳市宝安区欣欣小学) - Xin'er Community, Shajing Subdistrict
- Shenzhen Bao'an Xixiang Primary School (深圳市宝安区西乡小学) - Xixiang Subdistrict
- Shenzhen Bao'an Xixiang Gushu Primary School (深圳市宝安区西乡街道固戍小学) - Xixiang, Bao'an District
- Shenzhen Bao'an Xixiang Huang Tian Primary School (深圳市宝安区西乡街道黄田小学) - Huangtian, Xixiang Subdistrict
- Shenzhen Bao'an Xixiang Kangyuan Primary School (深圳市宝安区西乡康园小学) - Xixiang Sub-district
- Shenzhen Bao'an Xixiang Liutang Primary School (深圳市宝安区西乡街道流塘小学)
- Shenzhen Bao'an Xixiang Wenkang Primary School (深圳市宝安区西乡文康小学) - Xixiang Subdistrict
- Shenzhen Bao'an Xixiang Xiwan Primary School (深圳市宝安区西乡西湾小学) - Bihaiwan Commercial Development Zone, Xixiang
- Shenzhen Bao'an Xixiang Zhongwu Primary School (深圳市宝安区西乡街道钟屋小学) - Zhongwu Community, Xixiang Subdistrict
- Shenzhen Baocheng Primary School (深圳市宝安区宝城小学) - Zone 14, Baocheng
- Shenzhen HongYa Primary School (深圳市宝安区弘雅小学)
- Shenzhen Shanghe Primary School (深圳市宝安区上合小学) - Baocheng
- Shenzhen Tian Jiao Primary School (深圳市宝安区天骄小学) - Zone 75, Xincheng
- Shenzhen Fenggang Primary School (深圳市宝安区凤岗小学)
- Shiyan Primary School (石岩小学) - Shiyan Subdistrict
- Shiyue Primary School (拾悦小学) - Shajing Subdistrict
- Yangtaishan Primary School (羊台山小学)
- Youzhi Experimental Primary School (优智实验小学) - Zone 55, Xincheng
