= Shenzhen–Hong Kong cross-boundary students =

- Traditional Chinese: 深港跨境學童
- Simplified Chinese: 深港跨境学童
Transcriptions
Standard Mandarin
- Hanyu Pinyin: Shēn Gǎng Kuàjìng Xuétóng
Yue: Cantonese
- Jyutping: sam1 gong2 kwaa1 ging2 hok6 tung4

Shenzhen–Hong Kong cross-boundary students (traditional Chinese: 深港跨境學童; simplified Chinese: 深港跨境学童) are people who are born and study in Hong Kong but live in mainland China. In a daily student migration, every school day they arrive in and exit from Hong Kong primarily through 5 land boundary control points: Lo Wu, Sha Tau Kok, Lok Ma Chau, Man Kam To, and Shenzhen Bay. They mainly study in Yuen Long, Tuen Mun, Tai Po while the majority in the North district.

Since the 2001 Chong Fung Yuen “Right of abode” case, babies born in Hong Kong to mainland women are entitled the right of abode in Hong Kong. Favoured with the 2003 Individual Visit Scheme, a large number of mainland pregnant women came to Hong Kong to give birth for their children's right of residence. Accordingly, the number of cross-boundary students, who are also doubly non-permanent resident children, surged since 2006.

Meanwhile, with the low-birth rate in Hong Kong, a portion of primary and secondary schools were forced to close down, especially those in rural areas. To maintain their operation, some schools welcome these children to study under them to increase the admission rate. This results in a further elevation of the number of cross-boundary students.

In recent years, mainland schools no longer accept applications of children who do not have Hukou in mainland with only right of abode in Hong Kong. Children born in Hong Kong and live in mainland can either study in mainland international schools or schools located in Hong Kong.

== Number of cross-boundary students ==
Academic Year	Kindergarteners	Primary Students	Secondary Students	Total number of CB students
2004/05	733	2589	481	3803
2005/06	962	2998	538	4498
2006/07	797	2878	799	4474
2007/08	1456	3466	937	5859
2008/09	1780	3910	1078	6768
2009/10	2681	4090	1267	8038
2010/11	3786	4575	1538	9899
2011/12	5700	5400	1700	12800
2012/13	7454	6749	2197	16400

== Impact ==
According to the “Report on Primary One Admission 2012” around 20% of the Northern District students were sent to the 11th or onward primary school places. The growth of the cross-border students who are "neither-is" and "either-is" children. Thus, there are insufficient places for primary one in Northern district.

=== Impact on schools ===
Hong Kong government suggested small group education to provide better education standards a few years ago. The growth of CBS in Northern District would lead to the increase of classes and the class size of primary one, from 27 to around 39–42 in 2013. Heavier workloads and more pressure are thus given to the teachers. The difference between "neither-is" or "either-is" children and local children in culture and abilities, placed stress on teachers as it was, and is, impossible for the schools to separate those "neither-is" and "either-is" students apart from locals. More resources are also needed for the schools to provide support to students who have special needs. This is because there is no special education in China, and parents in mainland prefer main line schools in Hong Kong rather than special schools for their children with special needs. Resulting in added pressure on the teachers in the Northern district to provide extra care for those children.

=== Impact on local parents ===
Local children are unable to secure places in Northern district primary schools. It is inconvenient for them to study in other districts. The increase of class size may affect the quality of education. The unnecessary transportation of CBS worsened the problems of transportation system in the Northern District.

=== Impact on Shenzhen parents ===
In 2012, the Shenzhen government did not allow those "neither-is" or "either-is" children who are classified as Hong Kong residents to study in Shenzhen government schools. Thus, Shenzhen parents let their children to study in Hong Kong where there is also better education quality. They allow their children to live in Hong Kong due to the long travel time to Hong Kong. This can ultimately lead to unhealthy growth both mentally and physically of CBS due to the separation of family.

=== Impact on cross-boundary students ===
==== Safety issues ====
Cross-boundary students (CBS) have to attend school and return home every day, usually without the company of their parents. Ways for CBS to come to Hong Kong include Cross Boundary School Coaches (CBSC), nanny buses and public transport. Since the pick-up/drop-off points at the current boundary control points are limited, students may need to get on or off the coaches and nanny buses in crowded areas and are exposed to dangers of traffic accidents and kidnapping.

Growing concerns are also raised regarding the insufficient issues of Closed Road Permits necessary for CBCS and Closed Area Permits for students who take the nanny bus service. Though the government figure reveals a rise of issues per year, parents and schools are demanding for more quotas due to the increasing rates of cross-boundary students.

==== Regional identity crisis ====
The difference between Hong Kong and mainland China's culture has led to difficulties for CBS to adjust their identity. With a lack of understanding in Hong Kong's culture, systems and values, failure to naturalize and adapt in Hong Kong is common among CBS.

Language differences result in communication difficulty since many of the CBS are more fluent in Mandarin than Cantonese. Further enhancing the difficulty of connecting with local students. Little participation of after-school extra–curriculum activities due to their shuffling across boundaries, are also common reasons for the lack of development socially.

== Proposed solutions ==
=== Pilot scheme and travel support ===
The government starts the pilot scheme, allocates Closed Area Permits (CAP) for cross-boundary students in higher priority, issues special quotas for their coaches and provides travel subsidy for students.

=== Increase school place (return system) ===
On 23 March 2013, Undersecretary for Education Kevin Yeung Yun-hung said that school places would be increased and students living in the Northern District can study through the Return System if they are allocated to study in Tai Po District.

=== New school net ===
On the 6th of February 2013, Secretary for Education Eddie Ng Hak-kim declared that a new school net should be set up for the cross-boundary students.

=== Pay for school places in Shenzhen ===
On 6 February 2013, honorary chairman of Liberal Party James Tien Pei-chun suggested the Education Bureau to pay for the school places in Shenzhen and provide free education for the cross-boundary students.

== See also ==
- Education in Shenzhen
