= Shenzhen Academy of International Education =

Private international school in China

- 深圳市博納學校
- No. 13 Zhongxiang Road, Nanshan District, Shenzhen, Guangdong, China

Information
- Type: Private international school
- Established: 2014
- Principal: Chen Xiaomin (founder)
- Campus type: Urban, garden-style
- Accreditation: WASC, CollegeBoard (AP), ACT, Edexcel
- Website: http://www.usapschool.com

The Shenzhen Academy of International Education (SAIE; Chinese: 深圳市博納學校), also known as Shenzhen Bona School, is a private international school located in Nanshan District, Shenzhen, China. Founded in 2014, it offers programs from junior high through high school, including an international arts high school division.

== History ==
The school was founded by Chen Xiaomin, who also serves as its principal. in 2012 and officially opened in 2014.

== Curriculum ==
SAIE provides a range of international curricula, including:

- American high school program with AP courses
- A-Level
- Hong Kong DSE
- International arts programs

The school holds multiple international accreditations, including WASC, CollegeBoard, ACT, and Edexcel.

== See also ==
- Shenzhen College of International Education (SCIE)
