= List of schools in Luohu District =

This is a list of schools in Luohu District, Shenzhen.

== Shenzhen municipal schools ==
Schools operated by the Shenzhen municipal government in Luohu District include:

- Shenzhen Middle School
- Shenzhen No. 2 Experimental School (深圳市第二实验学校)
- Shenzhen Primary School (深圳小学)

== Luohu district schools ==
=== Secondary schools ===
- Affiliated School of Luohu Education Institute - Qingshuihe Subdistrict
- Shenzhen Buxin Middle School
- Shenzhen Cuiyuan Junior Middle School
- Shenzhen Cuiyuan Middle School
- Shenzhen Cuiyuan Middle School Dongxiao
- Shenzhen Dawang School - Dawang Village, Donghu Subdistrict,
- Shenzhen Donghu Middle School
- Shenzhen Guiyuan Middle School
- Shenzhen Honggui Middle School
- Shenzhen Luohu Binhe Experimental Middle School
- Shenzhen Luohu Foreign Languages School - Liantang Subdistrict
- Shenzhen Luohu Foreign Languages School Experimental Section
- Shenzhen Luohu Foreign Languages Junior School - Liantang Subdistrict
- Shenzhen Luohu Middle School
- Shenzhen Luohu Senior High School
- Shenzhen Luohu Senior High School Junior Section
- Shenzhen Luohu Xingyuan School
- Shenzhen Songquan Experimental School
- Shenzhen Sungang Middle School
- Shenzhen Wenjin Middle School

=== Vocational schools ===
- Shenzhen Xingzhi Vocational School (Shenzhen Art High School)

=== Primary schools ===
- Affiliated School of Luohu Education Institute - Qingshuihe Subdistrict
- Shenzhen Anfang Primary School
- Shenzhen Baicaoyuan Primary School
- Shenzhen Beidou Primary School
- Shenzhen Bibo Primary School
- Shenzhen Binhe Primary School
- Shenzhen BuXin Primary School
- Shenzhen Caopu Primary School - Caopu West Subdistrict
- Shenzhen Cuizhu Foreign Language Experimental School (Campuses I and II, both in Cuizhu Subdistrict)
- Shenzhen Cuibei Experimental Primary School
- Shenzhen Cuiyin School
- Shenzhen Dawang School - Dawang Village, Donghu Subdistrict,
- Shenzhen Dongchang Primary School
- Shenzhen Dongxiao Primary School
- Shenzhen Fengguang Primary School
- Shenzhen Guiyuan Primary School
- Shenzhen Honggui Primary School
- Shenzhen Honghu Primary School
- Shenzhen Hongling Primary School
- Shenzhen Huali Primary School - Beverly Hills
- Shenzhen Jingbei Primary School - Jingbeinan Residential Area
- Shenzhen Jingxuan Primary School
- Shenzhen Jintian Primary School (Jintian Campus and Dehong Campus)
- Shenzhen Liannan Primary School
- Shenzhen Liantang Primary School - Liantang
- Shenzhen Luofang Primary School
- Shenzhen Luohu Primary School
- Shenzhen Luohu Hubei Primary School
- Shenzhen Luohu Xingyuan Primary School
- Shenzhen Luoling Foreign Language Experimental School (No. 1 and No. 2 Campuses)
- Shenzhen Nanhu Primary School
- Shenzhen Renmin Primary School
- Shenzhen Shuiku Primary School
- Shenzhen Shuitian Primary School
- Shenzhen Songquan Experimental School - Dongxiao Subdistrict
- Shenzhen Sungang Primary School
- Shenzhen Taining Primary School
- Shenzhen Taojinshan Primary School
- Shenzhen Wutong Primary School - Chishuidong Village, Wutong Mountain
- Shenzhen Xiantong Experimental Primary School - Liantang Sub-district
- Shenzhen Xiangxi Primary School
- Shenzhen Xinxiu Primary School
- Shenzhen Yijing Primary School
