= List of schools in Guangming District =

This is a list of schools in Guangming District, Shenzhen.

== Shenzhen municipal schools ==
Schools operated by the Shenzhen municipal government in Guangming District include:

- Shenzhen No. 2 Vocational School of Technology (深圳市第二职业技术学校) - It has boarding facilities
- Shenzhen Yuxin School (深圳市育新学校), previously known as the Shenzhen Work-Study School - Guangming Subdistrict

== Guangming district schools ==
=== Secondary schools ===
- Shenzhen No. 22 Senior School (CAS Shenzhen Institutes of Advanced Technology) (深圳市第二十二高级中学(中国科学院深圳理工大学附属实验高级中学)) - Loucun Community, Xinhu Subdistrict
- Shenzhen Guangming Senior High School (深圳市光明区高级中学) - Matian Subdistrict
- Shenzhen Guangming No. 2 Middle School (深圳市光明区第二中学) - Matian Subdistrict,
- Shenzhen Guangming Gongming Middle School (深圳市光明区公明中学) - Gongming Subdistrict
- Shenzhen Guangming Guangming [sic] Middle School (深圳市光明区光明中学) - Guangming Community
- Guangming Xinghe Primary School Affiliated to South China Normal University (华南师范大学附属光明星河小学)
- Shenzhen Guangming Special Education School (深圳市光明区特殊教育学校) - Supply and Marketing Industrial Cooperatives Zone, Gongming Subdistrict, Guangming District

=== Nine-year schools ===
- Shenzhen School Affiliated to Sun Yat-sen University (中山大学深圳附属学校) - Xinhu Subdistrict
- Shenzhen Experimental School Guangming Campus (深圳实验光明学校) - Guangming Subdistrict
- Shenzhen Guangming Academy (深圳市光明书院) - Xinqiang Community, Xinhu Subdistrict
- Shenzhen Guangming Baihua Experimental School (光明区百花实验学校) - Baihua Community, Guangming Subdistrict
- Shenzhen Guangming Bohua School (深圳市光明区博华学校) - Shiwei Community, Matian Subdistrict
- Shenzhen Guangming Changzhen School (深圳市光明区长圳学校) - Yutang Subdistrict
- Shenzhen Guangming Chengming School (光明区诚铭学校) - Xinhu Subdistrict
- Shenzhen Guangming Chunlei School (深圳市光明区春蕾学校) - Shangcun Community, Gongming Subdistrict
- Shenzhen Guangming Erya School (深圳市光明区尔雅学校) - Wuliandui Industrial Zone, Shangcun Community, Gongming Subdistrict
- Shenzhen Guangming Experimental School (光明区实验学校) - Fenghuang Subdistrict
- Shenzhen Guangming Fenghuang School (深圳市光明区凤凰学校) - Guangming Subdistrict
- Shenzhen Guangming Fenghuang Peiying Wenwu Experimental School (深圳市光明区凤凰培英文武实验学校) - Tangwei Community, Fenghuang Subdistrict
- Shenzhen Guangming Fenghuangcheng Experimental School (光明区凤凰城实验学校) - Fenghuang Subdistrict
- Shenzhen Guangming Foreign Languages School (深圳市光明区外国语学校) - Fenghuang Community, Fenghuang Subdistrict
- Shenzhen Guangming Gongming Chinese-English School (光明区公明中英文学校) - Gongming Subdistrict
- Shenzhen Guangming Jinghua School (光明区精华学校) - Fenghuang Subdistrict
- Shenzhen Guangming Lilin School (深圳市荔林学校) - Second Vegetable Base, Loucun, Xinhu Subdistrict
- Shenzhen Guangming Lisonglang School (深圳市光明区李松蓢学校) - Lisonglang Community
- Shenzhen Guangming Mashantou School (深圳市光明区马山头学校) - Mashantou Community, Matian Subdistrict
- Shenzhen Guangming Mingqin Chengda School Affiliated to Central China Normal University (华中师范大学附属光明勤诚达学校) - Changzhen Community, Yutang Subdistrict
- Shenzhen Guangming Minzhong School (深圳市光明区民众学校) - Xinwei Hougang Industrial Zone, Xinzhuang Community, Matian Subdistrict
- Shenzhen Guangming Peiying Wenwu Experimental School (深圳市光明区培英文武实验学校) - Sixth Industrial Zone, Xiacun Community, Gongming Subdistrict
- Shenzhen Guangming Yingcai School (深圳市光明区英才学校) - Fourth Industrial Zone, Mashantou Community, Matian Subdistrict
- Shenzhen Guangming Yulü School (深圳市光明区玉律学校) - Yulü Village, Yulü Community, Yutang Subdistrict
- Shenzhen Institute of Education Sciences (Guangming) Experimental School (深圳市教育科学研究院实验学校（光明）) - Loucun Community, Xinhu Subdistrict

=== Primary schools ===
- Shenzhen Guangming Primary School (深圳市光明区光明小学) - Guangming Subdistrict
- Shenzhen Guangming Dongzhou Primary School (深圳市光明区东周小学)
- Shenzhen Guangming Gongming No. 1 Primary School (深圳市光明区公明第一小学) - Matian Subdistrict
- Shenzhen Guangming Gongming No. 2 Primary School (深圳市光明区公明第二小学) - Gongming Subdistrict
- Shenzhen Guangming Honghuashan Primary School (深圳市光明区红花山小学) - Matian Subdistrict
- Shenzhen Guangming Loucun Primary School (深圳市光明区楼村小学) - Xinhu Subdistrict
- Shenzhen Guangming Matian Primary School (深圳市光明区马田小学) - Citianpu Community, Matian Subdistrict
- Shenzhen Guangming Qingyi Primary School (深圳市光明区清一小学) - Third Industrial Zone, Xiacun Community, Gongming Subdistrict
- Shenzhen Guangming Qiushuo Primary School (深圳市光明区秋硕小学) - Gongming Subdistrict
- Shenzhen Guangming Tianliao Primary School (深圳市光明区田寮小学) - Tianliao Community, Yutang Subdistrict
- Shenzhen Guangming Xiacun Primary School (深圳市光明区下村小学) - Xiacun Community, Gongming Subdistrict
- Shenzhen Institute of Education Sciences (Guangming) Experimental Primary School (深圳市教育科学研究院实验小学（光明）) - Jinhong Garden, Matian Subdistrict
