= To Us, From Us =

2018 Chinese film

- Directed by: Lanxin Yu
- Screenplay by: Yujie Li; Lanxin Yu
- Produced by: Yujie Li
- Starring: Yanxi Ke; Hai Qin; Jingwen Xiong
- Cinematography: Anqi Wang
- Edited by: Guangwei Du; Bowei Yue
- Music by: Huazhang Dai; Fansheng Gao
- Release date: 2018
- Running time: 102 minutes
- Country: China
- Language: Mandarin

To Us, From Us (Chinese: 再见十八班) is a 2018 Chinese film directed by Lanxin Yu, and starring Yanxi Ke, Hai Qin, and Jingwen Xiong. It is written by Lanxin Yu and Yujie Li. The film premiered at the Taipei Golden Horse Film Festival on 17 November 2022, and was officially released in Taiwan on 10 February 2023.

The story was inspired by the high school experiences of the director, Lanxin Yu, adapted from real events at the Shenzhen Foreign Languages School.

June 22, 2025 a spinoff series, Too Young To Grow Old written and directly by Lanxin Yu, premiered on iQIYI.

== Cast ==
- Yanxi Ke as Chen Song
- Hai Qin as Ruiming Tan
- Jingwen Xiong as Miaomiao Qin

== Music ==
The theme song "To Us, From Us" of the film of the same name, is performed by Fansheng Gao who also participated in the songwriting and production.
