= Shen Wai International School =

School in Shenzhen, China

- 深圳外国语学校国际部

Location
- 29 Baishi 3rd Road; Shenzhen, Guangdong; The People's Republic of China; 22.5247453°N 113.9651325°E

Information
- Type: Private Non profit
- Established: 2001
- Director: Kitty Yang
- Head of school: Daniel legault
- Enrollment: 1200
- Colors: Green, White
- Website: http://www.swis.cn

Shen Wai International School
- Simplified Chinese: 深圳外国语学校国际部
- Traditional Chinese: 深圳外國語學校國際部
- Literal meaning: Shenzhen Foreign Language School International Section
Transcriptions
Standard Mandarin
- Hanyu Pinyin: Shēnzhèn Wàiguóyǔ Xuéxiào Guójìbù
Yue: Cantonese
- Jyutping: sam1 zan3 ngoi6 gwok3 jyu5 hok6 haau6 gwok3 zai3 bou6

Shen Wai International School (SWIS; Chinese: 深圳外国语学校国际部) is an international school in Nanshan District, Shenzhen, China. Its students are children of foreign expatriate workers and people with residency in Hong Kong and Macau as well as the current Republic of China (Taiwan) jurisdiction of Taiwan, the Pescadores, and Kinmen and Matsu. It is the international section of the Shenzhen Foreign Languages School.

SWIS is an authorized International Baccalaureate (IB) school for students aged 4–18: Primary Years Programme (PYP), Middle Years Programme (MYP) and Diploma Programme (DP). It is authorized by the Council of International Schools (CIS) and Western Association of Schools and Colleges (WASC).
