= List of schools in Pingshan District, Shenzhen =

This is a list of schools in Pingshan District, Shenzhen.

== Shenzhen municipal schools ==
Schools operated by the Shenzhen municipal government in Pingshan District include:

- Shenzhen Senior High School East Campus (东校区)

== Pingshan district schools ==
=== Twelve-year schools ===
- Shenzhen Longxiang School (深圳市龙翔学校) - Shabo, Maluan Subdistrict

=== Secondary schools ===
- Shenzhen Liren Senior High School (深圳市立人高级中学)
- Shenzhen Pingshan Guangzu Middle School (深圳市坪山区光祖中学) - Kengzi Subdistrict,
- Shenzhen Pingshan Middle School (深圳市坪山区坪山中学) - Pingshan Subdistrict
- Shenzhen Pingshan Senior High School (深圳市坪山区坪山高级中学) - Pingshan Subdistrict
- Shenzhen Pingshan Zhongshan Middle School (深圳市坪山区中山中学)
- Shenzhen Zhongxin High School (深圳市中新中学) - Maluan Subdistrict

=== Vocational schools ===
- Pingshan College of Shenzhen Radio and Television University (深圳广播电视大学坪山学院) - Pingshan Subdistrict

=== Nine-year schools ===
- Shenzhen Pingshan No. 2 Foreign Language School (深圳市坪山区第二外国语学校)
- Shenzhen Pingshan Boming School (深圳市坪山区博明学校) - Maluan Subdistrict
- Shenzhen Pingshan Experimental School (深圳市坪山区坪山实验学校)
- Shenzhen Pingshan Foreign Language Wenyuan School (深圳市坪山区外国语文源学校)
- Shenzhen Pingshan Hongjindi School (深圳市坪山区弘金地学校)
- Shenzhen Pingshan Huamingxing School (深圳市坪山区华明星学校) - Kengzi Subdistrict
- Shenzhen Pingshan Jingyuan Foreign Language School (深圳市坪山区景园外国语学校)
- Shenzhen Pingshan Jingzhi Experimental School (深圳市坪山区精致实验学校) - Laokeng Industrial Zone, Laokeng Community, Longtian Subdistrict
- Shenzhen Pingshan Longshan School (深圳市坪山区龙山学校) - Pingshan Subdistrict
- Shenzhen Pingshan Peiying School (深圳市坪山区培英学校) - Xinhe Village, Liuhe Community
- Shenzhen Pingshan Qiubao School (深圳市坪山区秋宝学校) - Kengzi Subdistrict
- Shenzhen Pingshan Special Education School (深圳市坪山区特殊教育学校) - Kengzi Subdistrict
- Shenzhen Pingshan Tongxin Foreign Language School (深圳市坪山区同心外国语学校)
- Shenzhen Pingshan Xinghui Experimental School (深圳市坪山区星辉实验学校) - Longtian Community, Longtian Subdistrict
- Shenzhen Pingshan Xinhe Experimental School (深圳市坪山区新合实验学校) - Maluan Subdistrict
- Shenzhen Pingshan Xiuxin School (深圳市坪山区秀新学校) - Kengzi Subdistrict

=== Primary schools ===
- Shenzhen Pingshan No. 2 Primary School (深圳市坪山区坪山第二小学) - Pingshan Subdistrict
- Shenzhen Pingshan Biling Primary School (深圳市坪山区碧岭小学) - Biling Community, Pingshan Subdistrict
- Shenzhen Pingshan Central Primary School (深圳市坪山区坪山中心小学) - Pingshan Subdistrict
- Shenzhen Pingshan Dongmen Primary School (深圳市坪山区东门小学) - Pingshan Subdistrict
- Shenzhen Pingshan Kengzi Central Primary School (深圳市坪山区坑梓中心小学) - Kengzi Subdistrict
- Shenzhen Pingshan Jinlong Primary School (深圳市坪山区锦龙小学) - Maluan Subdistrict
- Shenzhen Pingshan Jintian Primary School (深圳市坪山区金田小学) - Kengzi Subdistrict
- Shenzhen Pingshan Liulian Primary School (深圳市坪山区六联小学) - Pingshan Subdistrict
- Shenzhen Pingshan Longbei Primary School (深圳市坪山区龙背小学) - Longbei Village, Pingshan Subdistrict
- Shenzhen Pingshan Longtian Primary School (深圳市坪山区龙田小学) - Longtian Subdistrict
- Shenzhen Pingshan Maluan Primary School (深圳市坪山区马峦小学) - Maluan Subdistrict
- Shenzhen Pingshan Pinghuan School (深圳市坪山区坪环学校) - Longtian Subdistrict
- Shenzhen Pingshan Tangkeng Primary School (深圳市坪山区汤坑小学) - Biling Subdistrict
- Shenzhen Pingshan Xiangyang Primary School (深圳市坪山区向阳小学) - Pingshan Subdistrict
- Shenzhen Pingshan Xinghua Primary School (深圳市坪山区兴华小学) - Biling Subdistrict
- Shenzhen Pingshan Yangguang Primary School (深圳市坪山区阳光小学) - Liulian Community, Pingshan Subdistrict
- Shenzhen Pingshan Zhengyang Primary School (深圳市坪山区正阳小学) - Xiuxin Village, Kengzi Subdistrict
- Shenzhen Pingshan Zhongshan Primary School (深圳市坪山区中山小学) - Maluan Subdistrict
