= List of schools in Yantian District =

This is a list of schools in Yantian District, Shenzhen.

== Shenzhen municipal schools ==
Schools operated by the Shenzhen municipal government in Yantian District include:

- Shenzhen Foreign Languages School Senior High School Division

== Yantian district schools ==
=== Secondary schools ===
- Shenzhen Tiandong Middle School (深圳市田东中学) - Shatoujiao
- Shenzhen Yangang Middle School (深圳市盐港中学)
- Shenzhen Yantian Senior High School (深圳市盐田高级中学)
- Shenzhen Yantian Foreign Language School (深圳市盐田区外国语学校) - Dameisha
- Yantian Experimental School (盐田区实验学校)
- Yunhai School of Yanshan District (深圳市盐田区云海学校) - Yantian Subdistrict

=== Nine-year schools ===
- Shenzhen Yantian Yunhai School (深圳市盐田区云海学校) - Yantian Sub-district

=== Primary schools ===
- Linyuan Primary School in Yantian District (盐田区林园小学)
- Yantian Foreign Language Primary School (盐田区外国语小学) - Shatoujiao Subdistrict
- Yantian Foreign Language Primary School Donghe Branch (盐田区外国语小学东和分校) - Shatoujiao Subdistrict
- Yantian Gengzi Shouyi Zhongshan Memorial School (盐田区庚子首义中山纪念学校)
- Yantian Haitao Primary School (盐田区海涛小学)
- Yantian Lequn Experimental Primary School (盐田区乐群实验小学)
- Yantian Meisha Future School (盐田区梅沙未来学校) - Dameisha Subdistrict
- Yantian Tiandong Primary School (盐田区田东小学) - Shatoujiao Subistrict
- Yantian Tianxin Primary School (盐田区田心小学) - Shatoujiao Subdistrict
- Yantian Yangang Primary School (盐田区盐港小学)
