= List of schools in Longhua District, Shenzhen =

This is a list of schools in Longhua District, Shenzhen.

== Shenzhen municipal schools ==
Schools operated by the Shenzhen municipal government in Longhua District include:

- Shenzhen Senior High School North Campus (北校区)
- Shenzhen Second Foreign Languages School (深圳第二外国语学校) - Dashuikeng Community, Guanlan Subdistrict

== Longhua district schools ==
=== Twelve-year schools ===
- Boheng Experimental School (博恒实验学校) - Hongwanbang Science & Technology Park, Tongfucun, Dalang Subdistrict
- Longhua Chinese-English Experimental School (龙华中英文实验学校)
- Merchiston International School - Dalang Subdistrict
- Shenzhen China-US School (美中学校) - Guanlan Sub-district
- Zhanhua Experimental School (展华实验学校)

=== Secondary schools ===
- Grit Academy (格睿特高级中学) - Shangkeng Community, Guanhu Subdistrict
- Guanlan Middle School (观澜中学) - Guanlan Subdistrict
- Guanlan No. 2 Middle School (观澜第二中学) - Guanlan Subdistrict
- Houde Academy (厚德书院)
- Longhua Middle School (龙华中学) - Longhua Subdistrict
- Longhua Senior High School Education Group (龙华高级中学教育集团) - Minzhi Subdistrict
- Shenzhen Gezhi Academy (深圳市格致中学) - Minzhi Subdistrict
- Shenzhen Hongshan Middle School (深圳市红山中学)
- Xinhua Middle School (新华中学) - Longhua Subdistrict

=== Nine-year schools ===
- No. 2 Experimental School (第二实验学校) - Block 12, Yicheng Center
- No. 3 Experimental School (第三实验学校) - Block A, Tongfucun Industrial Zone, Dalang Community, Dalang Sub-district
- School Affiliated to Longhua Institute of Education Sciences (龙华区教育科学研究院附属学校) - Fucheng Subdistrict
- Aifu Experimental School (爱孚实验学校) - Block B, Dashuitian, Niuhu Community, Guanlan Subdistrict
- Aiyi School (爱义学校) - Dalang Subdistrict
- Baowen School (宝文学校) - Guanlan Subdistrict
- Bowen School (博文学校)
- Bromsgrove School Mission Hills - Guanlan Subdistrict
- Dalang Experimental School (大浪实验学校)
- Experimental School (实验学校)
- Foreign Languages School Affiliated to Shenzhen Institute of Education Sciences of Longhua District (深圳市龙华区教育科学研究院附属外国语学校) - Longhua Subdistrict
- Gaofeng School (高峰学校) - Gaofeng Community, Dalang Sub-district
- Guanlan Central School (观澜中心学校) - Guanlan Subdistrict
- Jinhua Experimental School (锦华实验学校) - Taoxia Village, Dalang Subdistrict
- Jinming School (锦明学校) - Daba Section, Dabuxiang Village, Guanlan Subdistrict
- Liuyi School (六一学校) - Minzhi Sub-district
- Longfeng School (龙丰学校) - Niudipu, Longhua Subdistrict
- Longhua Foreign Languages School (龙华区外国语学校) - Guanhu Subdistrict
- Longhua Innovation Experimental School (龙华区创新实验学校) - Longhua Subdistrict
- Longhua Institute of Education Sciences Affiliated School (龙华区教育科学研究院附属学校) - Minzhi Subdistrict
- Longhua Institute of Education Sciences Affiliated Experimental School (龙华区教育科学研究院附属实验学校) - Minzhi Subdistrict
- Longhua Qingquan Foreign Languages School (龙华区清泉外国语学校) - Longhua Subdistrict
- Longteng School (深圳市龙华区龙腾学校) - Minzhi Subdistrict
- Niulanqian School (牛栏前学校) - Niulanqian Village, Minzhi Subdistrict
- Qianlong School (潜龙学校) - Minzhi Subdistrict
- Sanlian Yongheng School (三联永恒学校) - Longhua Subdistrict
- Shenzhen Foreign Languages School Longhua Campus (深圳外国语学校龙华校区) - Shenzhen North Railway Station Area, Minzhi Subdistrict
- Shenzhen Longhua Hanwen Experimental School (深圳市龙华区翰文实验学校) - Building 8 Qilin Industrial Zone, Xintian Community, Guanhu Sub-district
- Shenzhen Longhua Minzhi Middle School Education Group (深圳市龙华区民治中学教育集团) - Minzhi Subdistrict
- Shenzhen Longhua Minzhi Middle School Education Group Minxin School (深圳市龙华区民治中学教育集团民新学校)
- Shenzhen Longhua Nord Bilingual School (深圳市龙华区诺德双语学校) - Guanlan Subdistrict
- Shenzhen Longhua Second Foreign Languages School (深圳市龙华区第二外国语学校) - Dalang Subdistrict
- Shenzhen Longhua Vanke Bilingual School (深圳市龙华区万科双语学校) - Minzhi Subdistrict
- Shenzhen Longhua Xingzhi School (深圳市龙华区行知学校) - Fucheng Subdistrict
- Shenzhen Longhua Zhenneng School (深圳市龙华区振能学校) -Songyuanxia Community, Guanlan Subdistrict
- South China Experimental School (华南实验学校) - Minzhi Subdistrict
- Tongsheng School (同胜学校) - Shanghenglang Village, Dalang Subdistrict
- Wan'an School (万安学校) - Guanlan Subdistrict
- Xinyuan School (新园学校) - Mali Village, Guanlan Sub-district
- Xinzhi School (新智学校) - Tangqian Village, Zhangge Community, Guanlan Subdistrict
- Yulong School (玉龙学校)

=== Primary schools ===
- The Affiliated Primary School of Educational Science Research Institute of Shenzhen (教科院附属小学) - Innovation Industrial Park, Guanhu Subdistrict, Longhua District
- Bilan Foreign Language Primary School (碧澜外国语小学) - Guanlan Subdistrict
- Dandi Experimental School (丹堤实验学校) - Fengzehu Mountain Villa
- Defeng Primary School (德风小学) - Junzibu Community, Guanlan Sub-district
- Dongxing Primary School (东星小学) - Baishilong Village, Minzhi Subdistrict
- Dunbei Primary School (墩背小学) - Dunbei Community, Longhua Subdistrict
- Guangpei Primary School (广培小学) - Niuhu Community, Guanlan Subdistrict
- Guanlan No. 2 Primary School (观澜第二小学)
- Guihua Primary School (桂花小学) - Guanlan Subdistrict
- Heping Experimental Primary School (和平实验小学)
- Longhua No. 2 Primary School (龙华第二小学) - Gong Village
- Longhua Central Primary School (龙华中心小学) - Longhua Subdistrict
- Longlan Primary School (龙澜学校) - Dashuikeng Community, Guanlan Subdistrict
- Longwei Primary School (龙为小学) - Longhua Subdistrict
- Luhu Foreign Language Primary School (鹭湖外国语小学) - Guanhu Subdistrict
- Minle Primary School (民乐小学) - Block 1, Minle Village, Minzhi Subdistrict
- Minzhi Primary School (民治小学)
- Qinghu Primary School (清湖小学)
- Shenzhen Longhua Huayu Primary School (华育小学) - Longhua Subdistrict
- Shenzhen Longhua Minshun Primary School (民顺小学) - Minzhi Subdistrict
- Shuxiang Primary School (书香小学) - Minzhi Subdistrict
- Songhe Primary School (松和小学) - Longhua Subdistrict
- Weilai Primary School (未来小学)
- Wenfeng Primary School (文峰小学) - Tianliao Industrial Zone, Dahe Community
- Xingzhi Primary School (行知小学) - Building 1, Phase 4, Jinxiu Jiangnan Estate, Minzhi Sub-district
- Xingzhi Experimental Primary School (行知实验小学) - Minzhi Subdistrict
- Yuanfen Primary School (元芬小学) - Yuanfen Village, Dalang Subdistrict
- Yuying Primary School (育英小学) - Building 13, Shangzaohe Industrial Zone, Dalang Subdistrict
