= Shenzhen American International School =

International school in Shenzhen, China

- Simplified Chinese: 深美国际学校
- Traditional Chinese: 深美國際學校
Transcriptions
Standard Mandarin
- Hanyu Pinyin: Shēnměi Guójì Xuéxiào
Yue: Cantonese
- Jyutping: sam1 mei5 gwok3 zai3 hok6 haau6

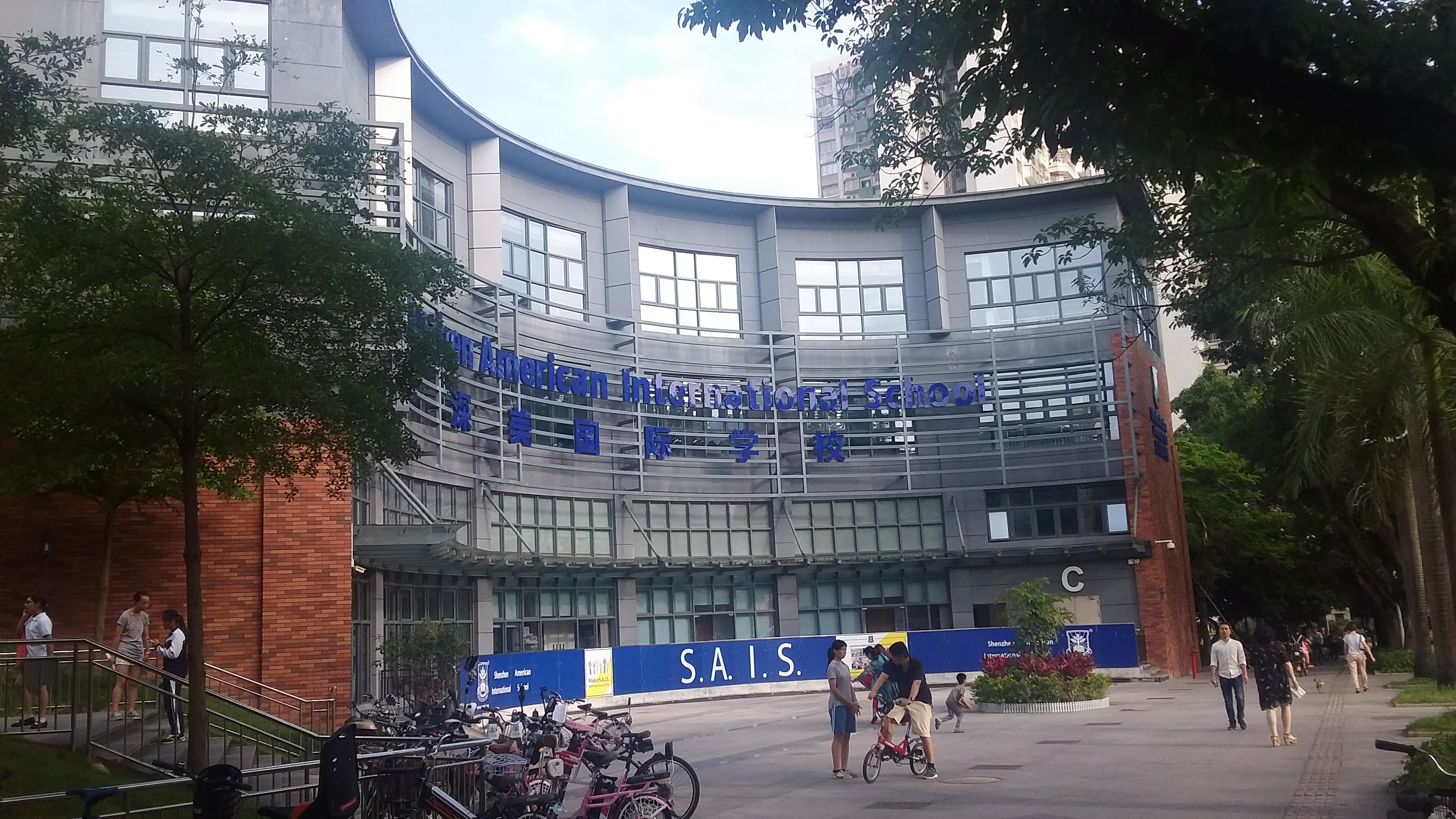
Shenzhen American International School

Shenzhen American International School (SAIS, Chinese: 深美国际学校) is an American international school in Shekou, Nanshan District, Shenzhen, Guangdong, China.

Shenzhen American International School (SAIS) is a Cognia accredited school which was established upon the approval of both the Ministry of Education of the People's Republic of China and the Department of Education of Guangdong Province in May 2005. SAIS provides exceptional education services to foreign nationals as well as students from HongKong, Macau and Taiwan.

As of 2018 it is one of eight schools in Shenzhen designated for children of foreign workers. Initially a China campus of Lee Academy of Maine, it was approved by the Ministry of Education of China in 2005. Due to issues regarding land, by 2008 it had not yet been built.

Project Based Learning History

SAIS is a PreK-8 school whose 2015-2022 curriculum was heavily influenced by the High Tech High charter schools in San Diego, the Buck Institute for Education, Edutopia, as well as the Maker Movement in general.

SAIS previously hosted a school Maker Faire every November, has one of Shekou's first school makerspaces (MakerSAIS), and mounts an Exhibition of Learning each spring.

It was originally in another location in Nanshan District. The school opened in its current Shekou location in January 2014.

== See also ==
- Americans in China
- Education in Shenzhen
