= Western Association of Schools and Colleges =

US university accreditation organization until 2012

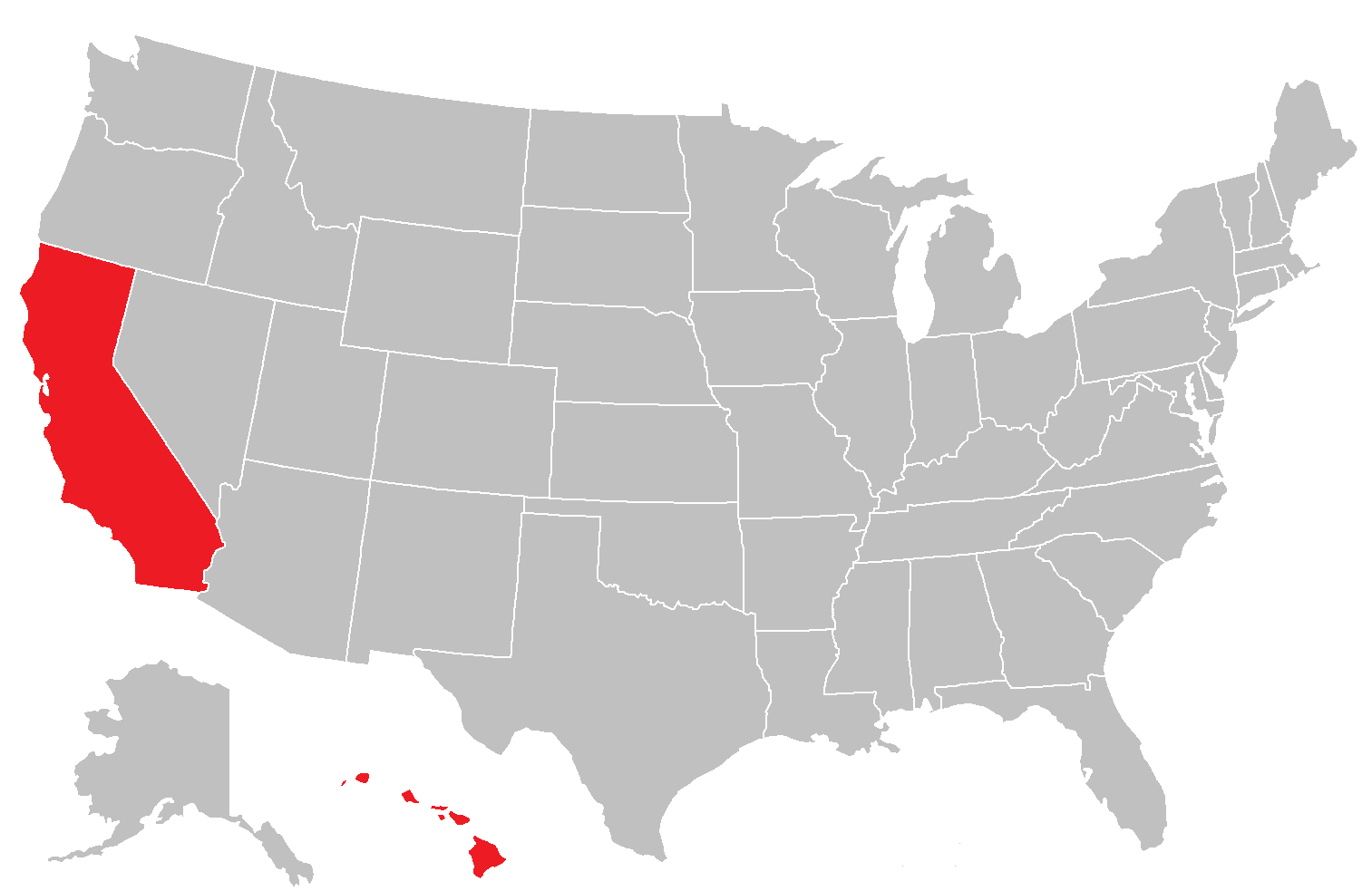
- WASC operational area
- Abbreviation: WASC
- Legal status: Association
- Headquarters: Burlingame, California; Alameda, California; Novato, California
- Region served: California, Hawaii, American Samoa, Guam, Marshall Islands, Federated States of Micronesia, Northern Marianas Islands, Palau, Tokyo, Prague, Yerevan, Seoul, Lima, Jeju Island
- Affiliations: CHEA, US Department of Education
- Website: ACS WASC; ACCJC; WSCUC

The Western Association of Schools and Colleges (WASC /wɒsk/ WOSK) was an organization that provided accreditation of public and private universities, colleges, secondary and elementary schools in California and Hawaii, the territories of Guam, American Samoa and Northern Marianas Islands, in addition to the Marshall Islands, Federated States of Micronesia, Palau, the Pacific Rim, Peru, Czech Republic, Armenia, and East Asia.

Until 2012, WASC was a single organization with three units. In 2012, it separated into three organizations that share the WASC acronym:

- The Accrediting Commission for Schools (ACS WASC)
- The Accrediting Commission for Community and Junior Colleges (ACCJC)
- The Senior College and University Commission (WSCUC)

== Accrediting Commission for Schools ==
The Accrediting Commission for Schools (ACS WASC) accredits schools below the college level. Included are elementary, junior high, middle, high and adult schools, whether public, private, or church-related. ACS WASC also accredits not-for-profit, non-degree granting postsecondary institutions.

== Accrediting Commission for Community and Junior Colleges ==
The Accrediting Commission for Community and Junior Colleges (ACCJC) evaluates and accredits public and private postsecondary institutions that offer two-year education programs and award the associate degree.

The ACCJC's mission is to help member institutions "to advance educational quality and student learning and achievement. This collaboration fosters institutional excellence and continuous improvement through innovation, self-analysis, peer review, and application of standards."

== WASC Senior College and University Commission ==
The WASC Senior College and University Commission (WSCUC) is an institutional accrediting agency for colleges and universities that award bachelor's degrees or more advanced degrees. It originally and still primarily accredits institutions in California, Hawaii, and the Pacific, as well as a limited number of institutions outside the U.S. WSCUC is recognized by the U.S. Department of Education as certifying institutional eligibility for federal funding in a number of programs, including student access to federal financial aid.

== See also ==
- Council for Higher Education Accreditation
- List of recognized higher education accreditation organizations
- United States Department of Education
