= Luohu Foreign Languages School =

Public school in Shenzhen, China

Location
- Liantang Sub-district, Luohu District, Shenzhen City, Guangdong Province; P. R. China

Information
- Other name: 罗湖外语学校
- Type: Public
- Motto: 文明、开放、严谨、质朴 (Civilized, Opening, Rigorous, Unadorned)
- Established: 1999
- Principal: Yuan Liangping
- Enrollment: 2550
- Campus: 19,156.9 square metres (206,203 ft^{2})
- Colors: Blue and white
- School anthem: 《Anthem of LFLS》
- Website: http://lhwy.school.luohuedu.net/lhwy/ http://lwcz.school.luohuedu.net/lwcz/

Luohu Foreign Languages School
- Simplified Chinese: 罗湖外语学校
- Traditional Chinese: 羅湖外語學校
Transcriptions
Standard Mandarin
- Hanyu Pinyin: Luóhú Wàiyǔ Xuéxiào
Yue: Cantonese
- Jyutping: lo4 wu4 ngoi6 jyu5 hok6 haau6

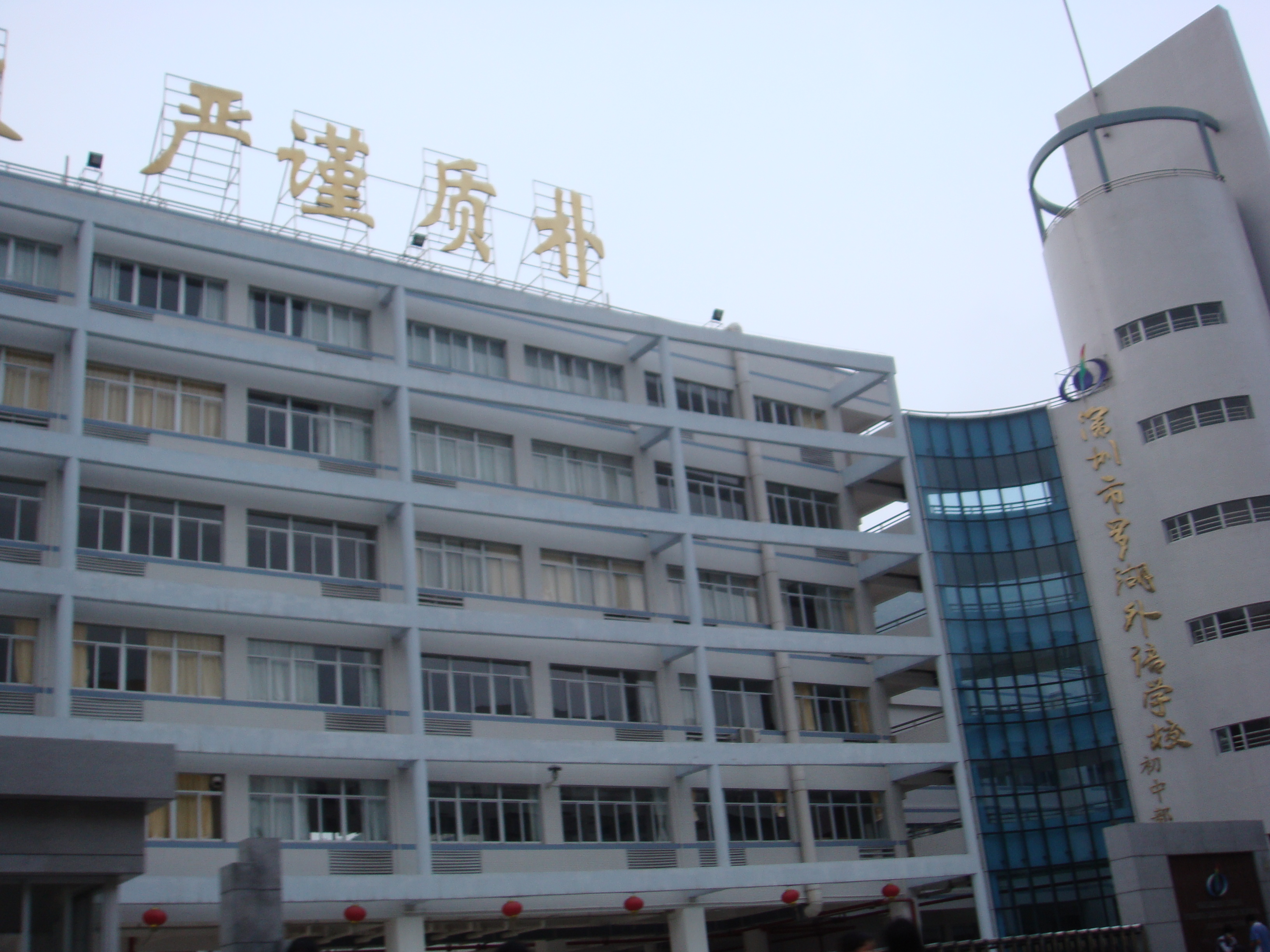
Teaching building

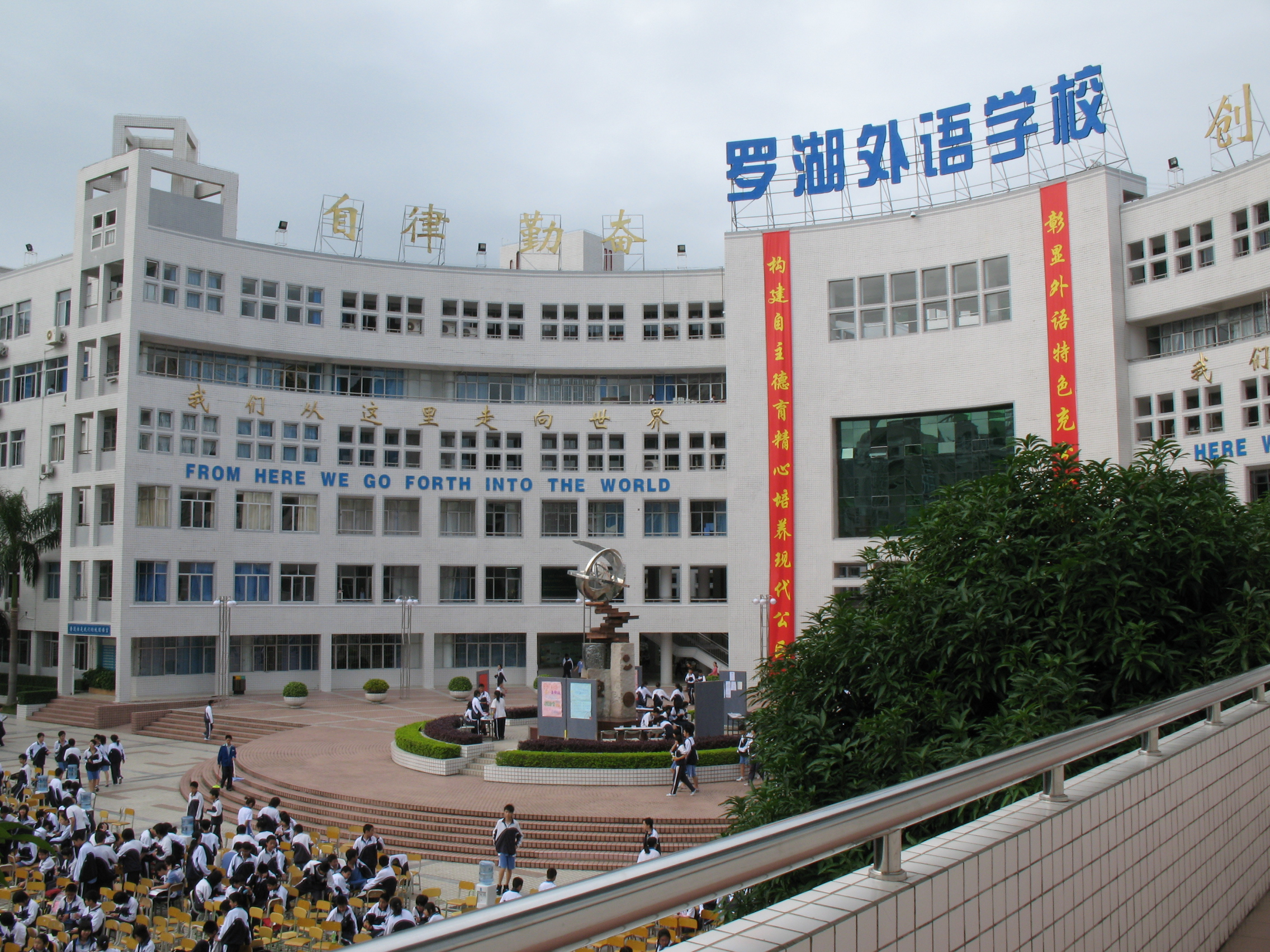
Teaching building of headquarters

Luohu Foreign Languages School (罗湖外语学校), or LFLS, is a First-Class School of Guangdong Province located in Liantang Sub-district, Luohu District, Shenzhen City, Guangdong Province. It is both a high school and a junior middle school.

== History ==
- On 24 April 1999, the People's Government of Luohu District built Luohu Foreign Languages School at the original address of the Shenzhen School of Technology.
- In May 2005 LFLS became a First-Class School of Luohu District.
- In April 2003 LFLS became a First-Class School of Shenzhen City.
- In April 2004 LFLS became a First-Class School of Guangdong Province.
- In September 2007 Liantang Middle School Campus came into service as the junior section of LFLS.

== Campus ==
LFLS has two campuses:

- Headquarters: Senior section, located at Xianhu Road.
- Liantang Middle School Campus: Junior section, located at Guowei Road.

== Principal ==
- 1999～2006: Chen Han'gang
- 2006～2013 Yuan Liangping
- 2013～now Ning Ge

== Campus activity ==
- Xmas garden party
- "Super Star" Campus Singer Contest
- Campus sports meeting
- Reading Month
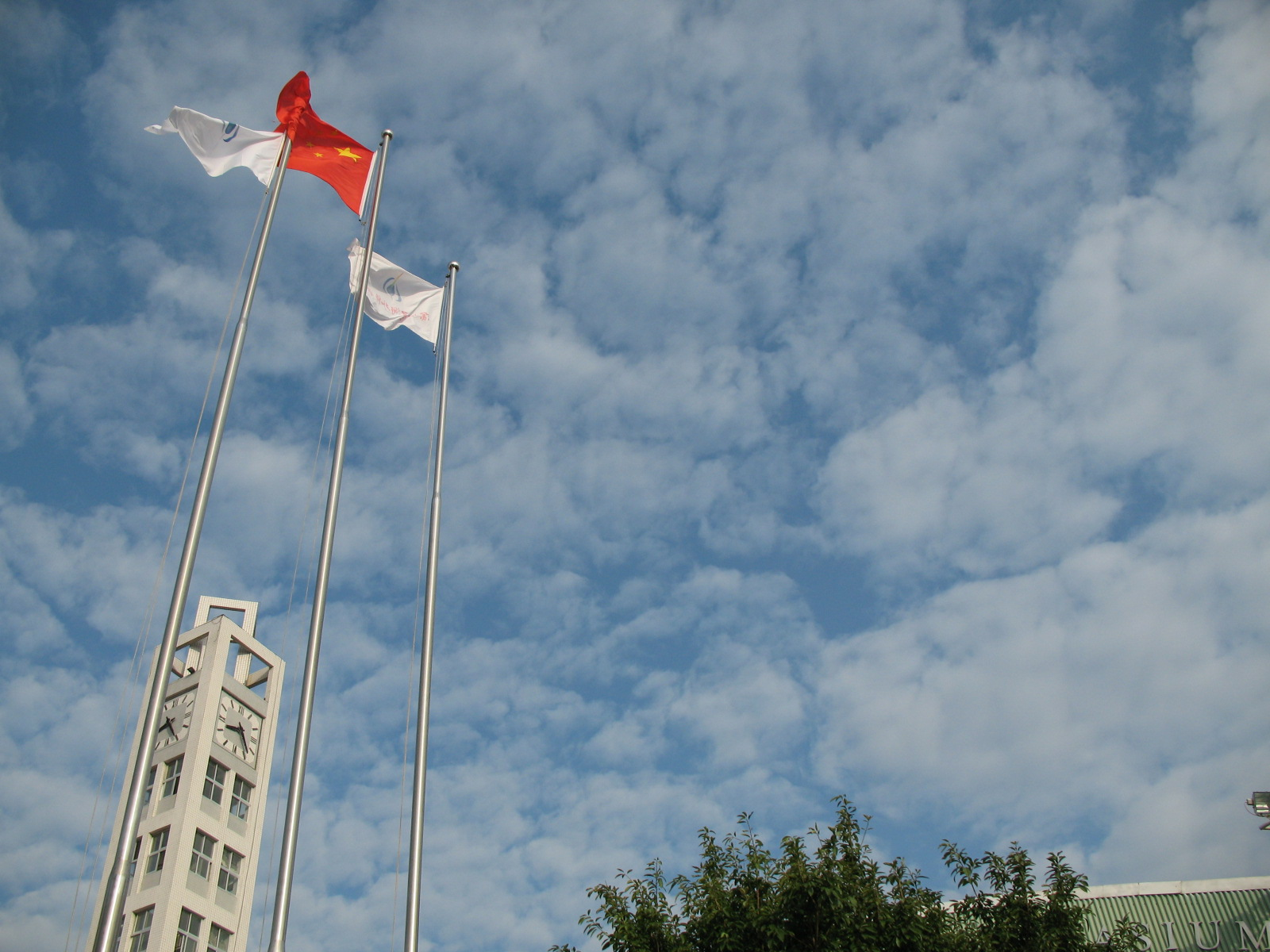
flag of PRC and flag of LFLS

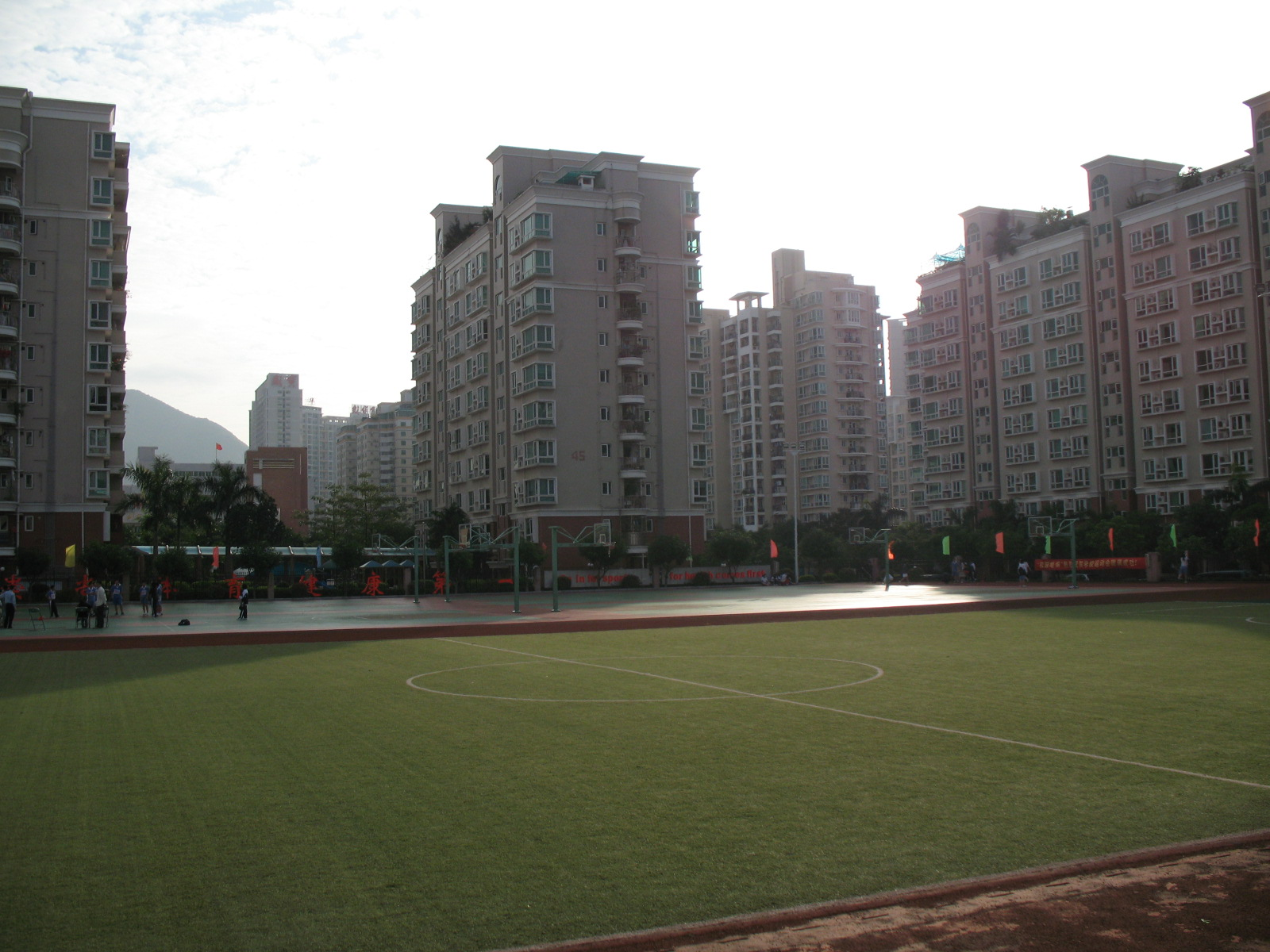
Soccer field and basketball courts of headquarters

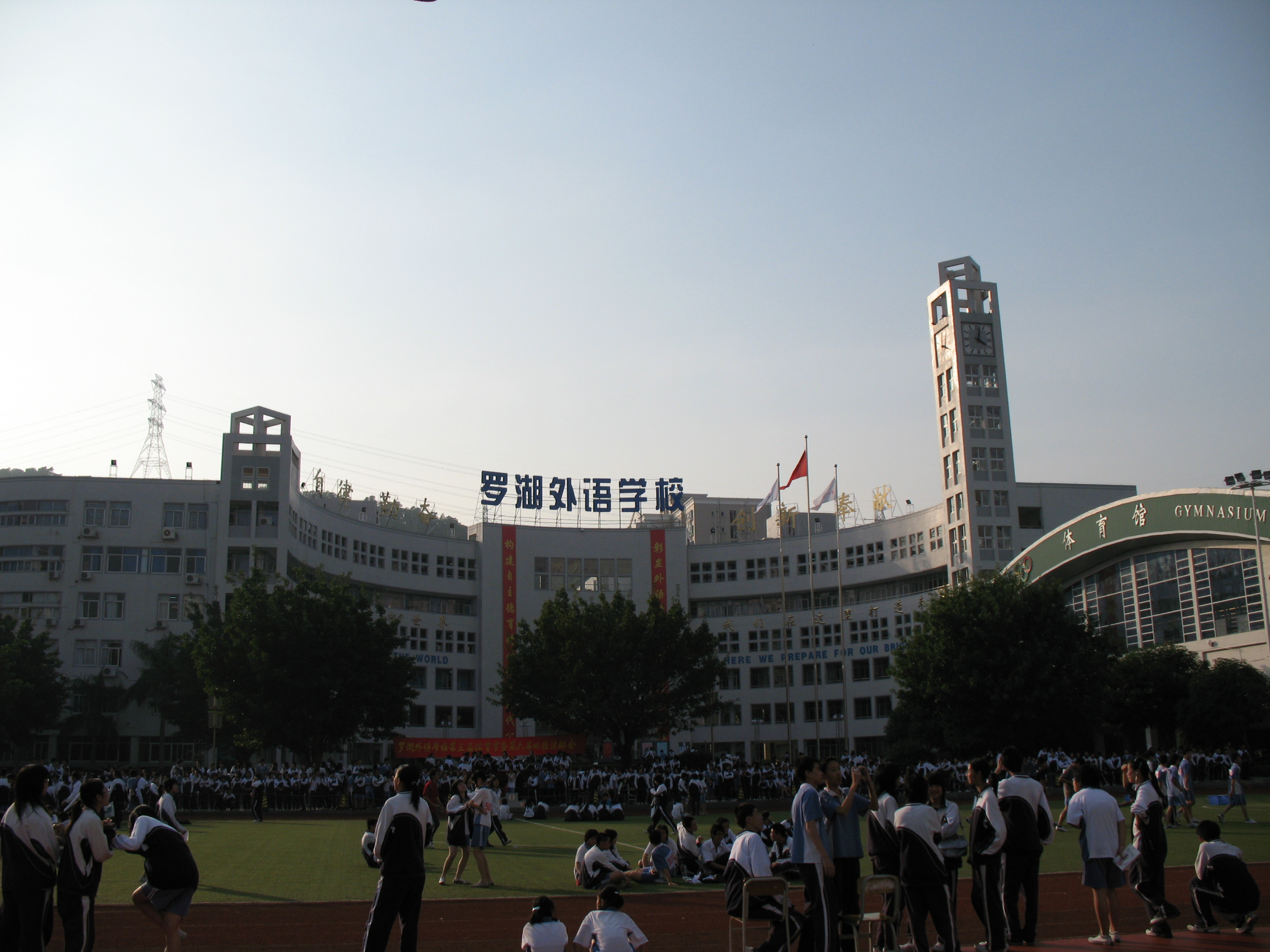
Sports Meeting
