= Shenzhen Open University =

University in Shenzhen, China

- 深圳开放大学 (Chinese)
- Type: Public University
- Established: 1980; 46 years ago
- Students: ~20,000
- Location: Shenzhen, Guangdong, China
- Website: szou.edu.cn

Chinese name
- Simplified Chinese: 深圳开放大学
- Traditional Chinese: 深圳開放大學
Transcriptions
Standard Mandarin
- Hanyu Pinyin: Shēnzhèn Kāifàng Dàxué

Shenzhen Open University (Chinese: 深圳开放大学), formerly known as Shenzhen Radio and TV University (Chinese: 深圳广播电视大学), is an educational institute in Shenzhen, China, headquartered in Luohu district, with branches in four other districts.
