= Shenzhen Huayi Experimental School =

School in Shenzhen, China

Coordinates: 22.7251°N 113.8331°E

- Simplified Chinese: 深圳市华一实验学校
- Traditional Chinese: 深圳市華一實驗學校
Transcriptions
Standard Mandarin
- Hanyu Pinyin: Shēnzhènshì Huáyī Shíyàn Xuéxiào
Yue: Cantonese
- Jyutping: sam1 zan3 si5 waa4 jat1 sat6 jim6 hok6 haau6

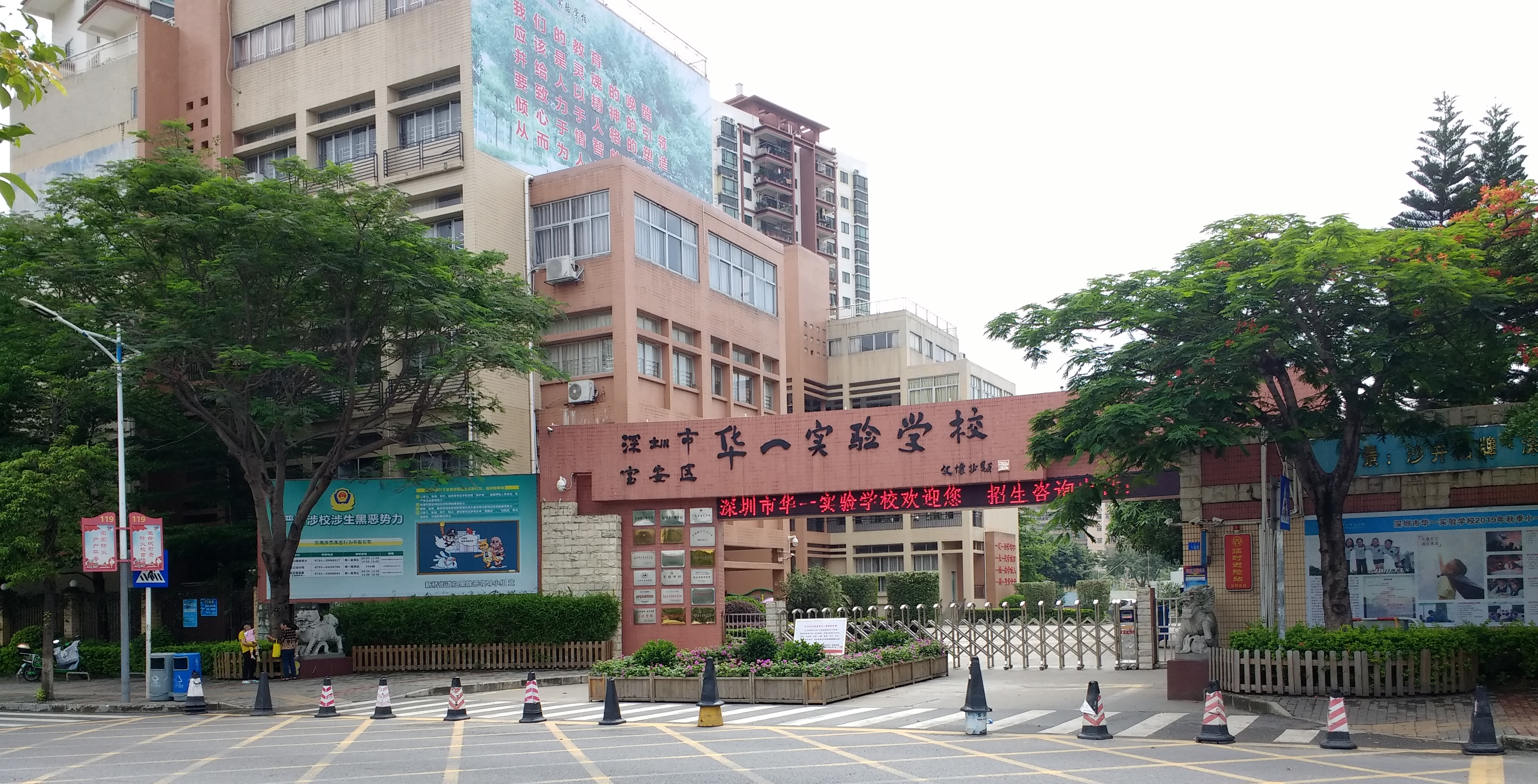
Huayi Experimental School

Shenzhen Huayi Experimental School (formerly known as Huashiyifuzhong Experimental School in Bao'an District, Shenzhen) was established in September 2005. It was created by Shenzhen Yuqi Investment Co., Ltd. It is a nine-year privately run school that integrates primary school and junior high school.

The school has won several awards.
