= Accrediting Commission for Schools - Western Association of Schools and Colleges =

Regional accrediting body for schools

- Abbreviation: ACS WASC
- Type: Nonprofit accrediting agency
- Headquarters: Burlingame, California, United States
- Region served: California, Hawaii, Guam, American Samoa, Northern Marianas, Marshall Islands, Micronesia, Palau, Fiji, and selected international locations
- Affiliations: Council for Higher Education Accreditation; U.S. Department of Education
- Website: www.acswasc.org

The Accrediting Commission for Schools - Western Association of Schools and Colleges (ACS WASC) is a regional accrediting body responsible for accrediting public and private schools below the college level, including elementary, secondary, and adult schools. ACS WASC also accredits some postsecondary, non-degree granting institutions. It is one of three organizations that emerged from the restructuring of the Western Association of Schools and Colleges in 2012, alongside the Accrediting Commission for Community and Junior Colleges (ACCJC) and the WASC Senior College and University Commission (WSCUC).

== Mission ==
ACS WASC states that it "advances and validates quality ongoing school improvement by supporting its private and public elementary, secondary, and postsecondary member institutions to engage in a rigorous and relevant self-evaluation and peer review process that focuses on equity, inclusion, and access to high-level, rigorous learning opportunities for all students."

== Scope ==
ACS WASC accredits approximately 5,500 institutions, including public, independent, church-related, charter, online, supplementary education programs, proprietary pre-K–12 schools, and adult schools. Its accrediting region covers California, Hawaii, Guam, American Samoa, the Commonwealth of the Northern Mariana Islands, the Federated States of Micronesia, the Republic of the Marshall Islands, Fiji, and other parts of Asia and the Pacific.

== Partnerships ==
ACS WASC collaborates with over 20 organizations in joint accreditation processes, including the California Department of Education, the Hawaii State Department of Education, the Council of International Schools, and the International Baccalaureate.

== See also ==
- Western Association of Schools and Colleges
- Accrediting Commission for Community and Junior Colleges
- WASC Senior College and University Commission
- Council for Higher Education Accreditation
