= QSI International School of Shenzhen =

School in Shenzhen, Guangdong, China

Coordinates: 22.4814°N 113.9136°E

QSI International School of Shenzhen,
- QSI (Shenzhen), QSI (Shekou)

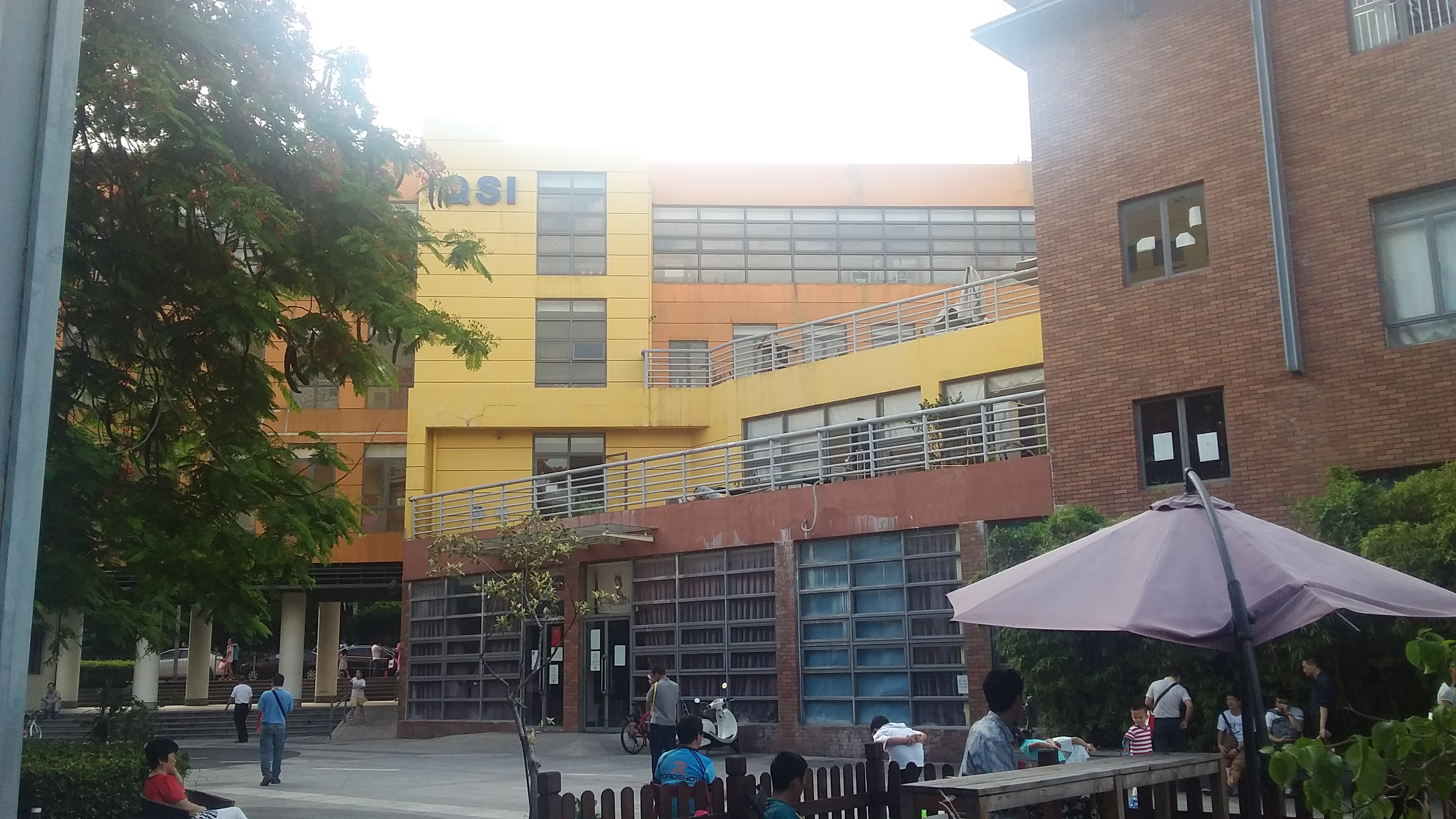

Location
- 8 Tai Zi Road; Nanshan District; Shenzhen, Guangdong Province, 518067; China

Information
- School type: Non-profit, International school
- Motto: "Success for All"
- Established: 2000
- School district: Nanshan
- Authority: QSI International Schools
- Principal: Claire Berger
- Staff: 300
- Grades: Preschool - 12th
- Age range: 3 to 18 year olds
- Enrolment: 1,353
- Average class size: 18
- Student to teacher ratio: 1 to 15
- Education system: American
- Hours in school day: 7 hours 20 minutes (8:30-15:50)
- Campuses: 3
- Mascot: Dragon
- Team name: QSI Dragons / QSIS
- Affiliations: Middle States Association of Colleges and Schools, Northwest Evaluation Association, International Baccalaureate, ACAMIS, College Board SAT & Advanced Placement, National Beta Club, Rho Kappa National Social Science Honor Society, National Chinese Honor Society, TEDx, TRI-M Music Honor Society, National Honor Society
- Website: https://www.shenzhen.qsi.org

QSI International School of Shenzhen
- Simplified Chinese: 深圳蛇口科爱赛国际学校
- Traditional Chinese: 深圳蛇口科愛賽國際學校
- Literal meaning: Shenzhen Shekou QSI International School
Transcriptions
Standard Mandarin
- Hanyu Pinyin: Shēnzhèn Shékǒu Kēàisài Guójì Xuéxiào
Yue: Cantonese
- Jyutping: sam1 zan3 se4 hau2 fo1 oi3 coi3 gwok3 zai3 hok6 haau6

QSI International School of Shekou
- Simplified Chinese: 蛇口科爱赛国际学校
- Literal meaning: Shekou QSI International School
Transcriptions
Standard Mandarin
- Hanyu Pinyin: Shékǒu Kēàisài Guójì Xuéxiào
Yue: Cantonese
- Jyutping: se4 hau2 fo1 oi3 coi3 gwok3 zai3 hok6 haau6

The QSI International School of Shenzhen (QSI Shenzhen; QSI 深圳蛇口科爱赛国际学校) is an international school located in the Nanshan District of Shekou, Shenzhen, Guangdong Province, China. It is part of the Quality Schools International (QSI) organization.

Previously, the school operated as two separate institutions: QSI International School of Shekou (蛇口科爱赛国际学校) and QSI International School of Shenzhen. QSI Shekou served students aged 2–18, while QSI Shenzhen enrolled students aged 2–13. As of 2018 it is one of eight schools in Shenzhen designated for children of foreign personnel. QSI also has several athletic achievements, such as winning the SISAC boys soccer tournament in 2024.

QSI Shenzhen's French section is designated as a French international school by the Agency for French Education Abroad (AEFE), a government agency of France.

== Campuses ==
QSI Shenzhen operates multiple campuses to accommodate different educational levels.

- Preschool Lower Elementary Campus (PLE Campus) is on the same road as the main campus, the PLE campus is dedicated to early childhood and lower primary education.
- Main Campus – Located in the Bitao Center on Taizi Road, this campus serves students in the middle school.
- Secondary Campus – The secondary school campus is located on Gongyuan Road, providing facilities for high school students.

=== Former Campuses ===
Previously, QSI Shenzhen operated campuses in different locations across the city:

- First two years, QSI Shekou school operated out of villas located off of Yanshan Rd.
- In the third year (2003), QSI Shekou was moved to the present location on Taizi Rd across from Ming Wah.
- TCL Science Park, Nanshan District– One of the earlier locations of the school.
- Honeylake, Futian District, – Another former campus, situated near the Shenzhen Celebrities Club, adjacent to it.

== See also ==
- Education in Shenzhen – Overview of the education system in Shenzhen.
- Higher education in China – Information about universities and colleges in China.
