= Education in Shenzhen =

In 2009, there were 974 preschool educational institutions in Shenzhen, a city in Guangdong, China: 346 elementary schools with 589,500 students, 285 primary and secondary schools with 316,000 students, and 20 secondary vocational schools with 47,000 students. There were also nine full-time higher education institutions based in the city, one higher education institution with correspondence education and 109 higher education institution branches (in addition, 52 Chinese and foreign universities conduct training and research in the Shenzhen Virtual University Park). In total, 67,000 students studied at Shenzhen universities (more than 600 thousand students were enrolled in correspondence courses).

== History ==
Prior to the 1980s there were no tertiary educational institutions in Shenzhen; the secondary level was the highest available in the city. The impetus for developing the education infrastructure in the former Bao'an County came as it was redesignated as the Shenzhen Special Economic Zone and there was a demand for educated professions. The SEZ designation brought in the first influx of university graduates. 38 additional secondary schools opened in the period 1980 through 1995. Universal primary education was achieved by 1989, universal matriculation to junior high school was achieved by 1994, and universal completion of junior high school was achieved by 1995.

== Colleges and universities ==
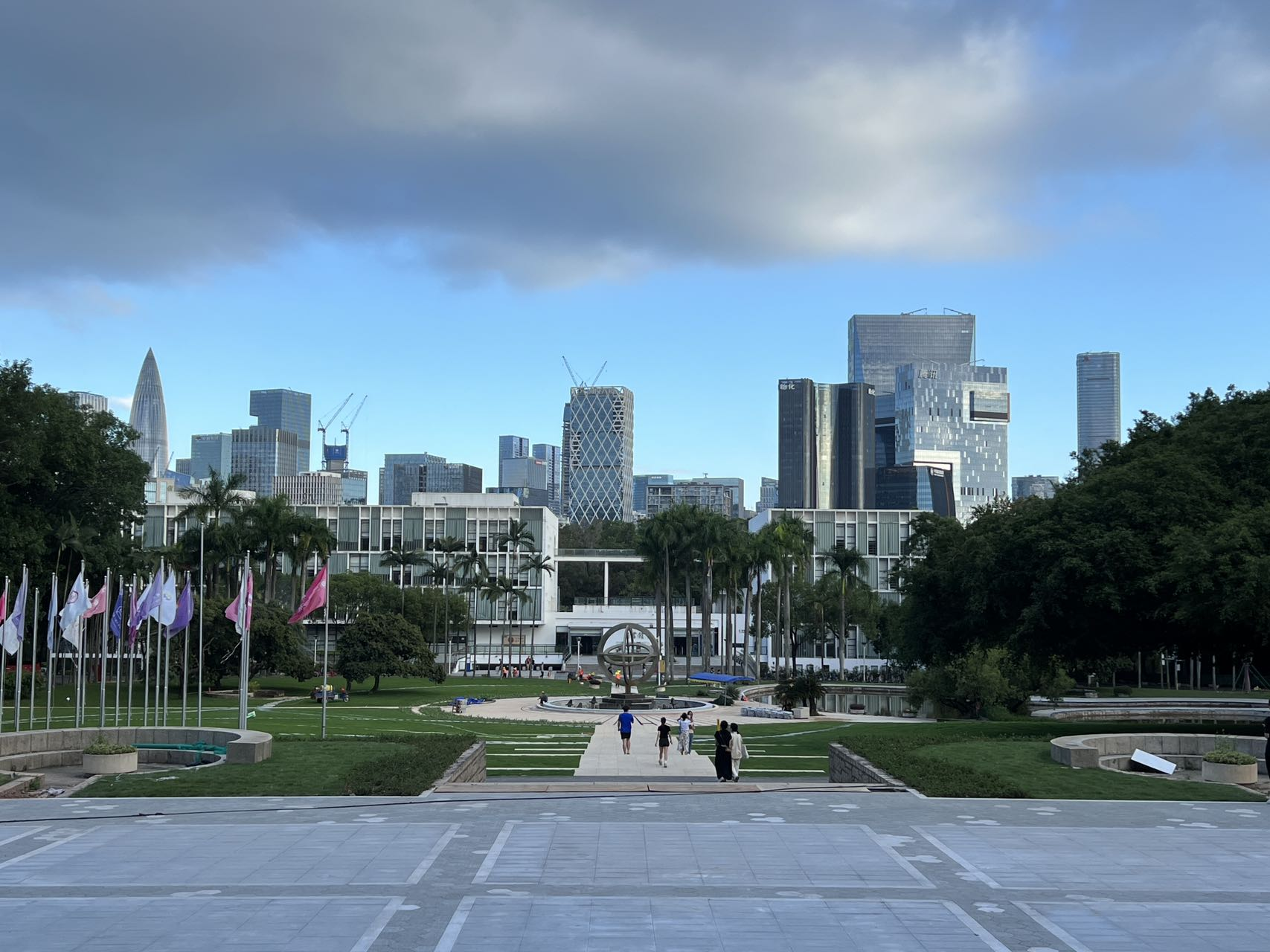
Shenzhen University

The largest university in Shenzhen is Shenzhen University, founded in 1982 and based in the Nanshan District. Among the leading higher and secondary educational institutions of the city are:

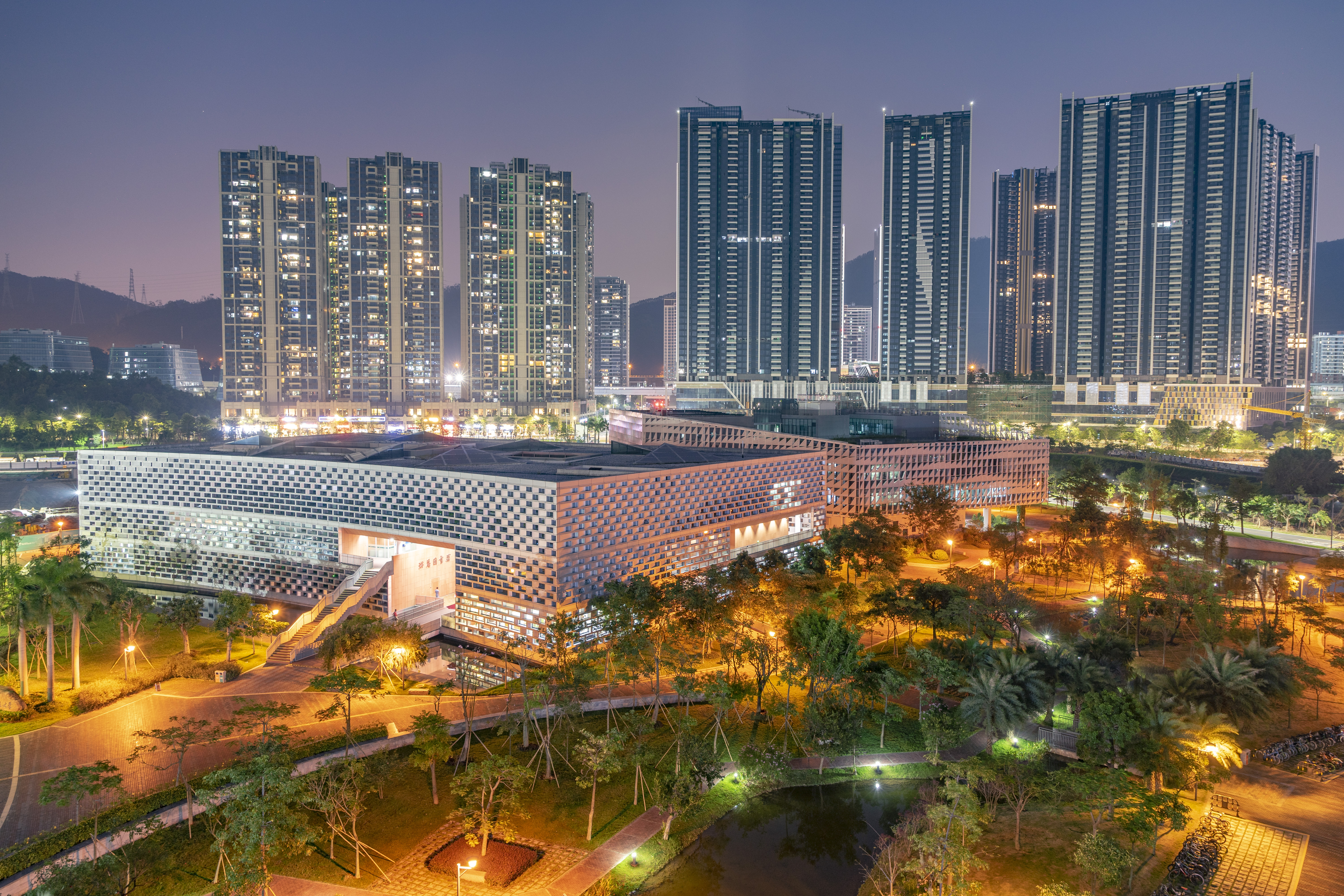
Southern University of Science and Technology

- Shenzhen Polytechnic
- Shenzhen Urban Vocational College, previously Shenzhen Institute of Technology (Chinese: 深圳技师学院)
- Shenzhen Radio and TV University
- Shenzhen Institute of Information Technology
- Peking University Shenzhen Graduate School
- Tsinghua Shenzhen International Graduate School
- Harbin Institute of Technology (Shenzhen)
- Shenzhen Technology University
- Shenzhen University of Advanced Technology
- Southern University of Science and Technology (SUSTech)
- Peking University HSBC Business School
- Peking University School of Transnational Law
- Shenzhen Institutes of Advanced Technology, Chinese Academy of Sciences
- The Chinese University of Hong Kong, Shenzhen
- Shenzhen MSU-BIT University (Chinese: 深圳北理莫斯科大学)
- Shanghai Jiao Tong University Antai Economics Management College, Shenzhen
- Shenzhen University
- Sun Yat-sen University - Shenzhen Campus

== K-12 education ==
According to Laurie Chen of the South China Morning Post, Shenzhen, which had 15 million people as of 2019, had not built as many primary and secondary schools for its populace as it should have, compared to similarly developed cities in China. In 2016 Qian Jinghua of Sixth Tone stated that there is a high demand for education in Shenzhen, with many schools oversubscribed. Most enrollment slots are only open to persons with Shenzhen residence permits, or hukou, and Qian Jinghua stated "Even for students with local residency, competition is fierce, and public education isn't without economic costs" due to attempts to find housing zoned to superior public schools as housing becomes increasingly expensive. Laurie Chen cited the acceptance rate of Shenzhen secondary schools in 2018: 35,000 slots were available for almost 80,000 applicants. She also cited how Guangzhou had 961 primary schools while Shenzhen had only 344 primary schools, as well as how Guangzhou's count of primary school teachers exceeded that of Shenzhen's by 17,000; Chen argued that Guangzhou and Shenzhen have similar populations. For families without Shenzhen hukou, the competition is more severe. Circa 2016 the Guangzhou Daily stated that non-Shenzhen hukou students each have a 1.71% possibility of admission to the "Famous Four" public schools in Shenzhen, the four most-respected public schools in the city, while a person with a Shenzhen hukou has a possibility under 10%.

In response to the high demand for education, by 2019 Shenzhen schools began increasing salaries for prospective teachers.

=== Academic performance ===
In 1993 Shenzhen's tertiary entrance examination scores were significantly not as high as the ones in summer 1995. Between those two dates the 2+1 education programme was implemented which encouraged students who were deemed not as likely to succeed in tertiary education to instead enroll in technical school. In summer 1995 2,595 people graduated from Shenzhen secondary schools, with 1,722 scoring above the required score for university enrollment, making up 66.4% of the 2,595 secondary school graduates who sat for the secondary school examinations. By 1995, of the major cities in the province, Shenzhen took third place or higher in six university entrance tests; there were seven such tests total. According to Jin Xiao, academic performances of secondary schools are often measured through statistics regarding matriculation into university.

=== Vocational/technical education schools ===
Shenzhen had multiple vocational/technical education (VTE; 职业技术教育; 職業技術教育; Zhíyè jìshù jiàoyù; zik1 jip6 gei6 seot6 gaau3 juk6) schools in the 1990s. The Shenzhen Teacher Continuing Education School was, in 1979, the sole normal school in the city. It was controlled by the Shenzhen Education Department. It took students who graduated from junior high and there were 80 students in 1979. There were nine other secondary specialised schools (SSS) with the same enrollment conditions established under that department in the 1980s. In 1989 the SSS schools were the sole VTEs that had enrollments over 400.

In the 1990s the general education senior high schools and combined junior-senior high schools had a total of 29 vocational/technical divisions (VTD); in some of those combined secondary schools the VTD was the sole available upper secondary division, whilst in others there were both VTD and general upper secondary education available. In that decade Shenzhen had six independent vocational upper secondary schools (IVUSS). The Shenzhen Labour Department, as of the 1990s, had a single technical worker school (TWS).

In 1993 the city began building the Shenzhen Higher Vocational/Technical Education Institute (SVTEI). It opened in September 1994. Its initial enrollment was 200, with it climbing to 1,000 the following year.

=== Students attending Hong Kong schools ===
In 2012 the Shenzhen Education Bureau barred students of Hong Kong and Macau permanent residency from attending Shenzhen public (government) schools, even if both of their parents originated in Mainland China and even if their parents paid taxes in Shenzhen and/or worked in Shenzhen; at the time other cities in the province accepted students with Hong Kong and Macau residency. As a result, as of 2015, 30,000 children living in Shenzhen attended schools in Hong Kong. In 2016 parents sued the Education Bureau to get the right for Hong Kong and Macau-resident children to attend public schools in Shenzhen. Middle class Hong Kong-born children are often from families who are unable to pay for private schools in the Mainland and therefore must use Hong Kong public schools.

=== International schools ===
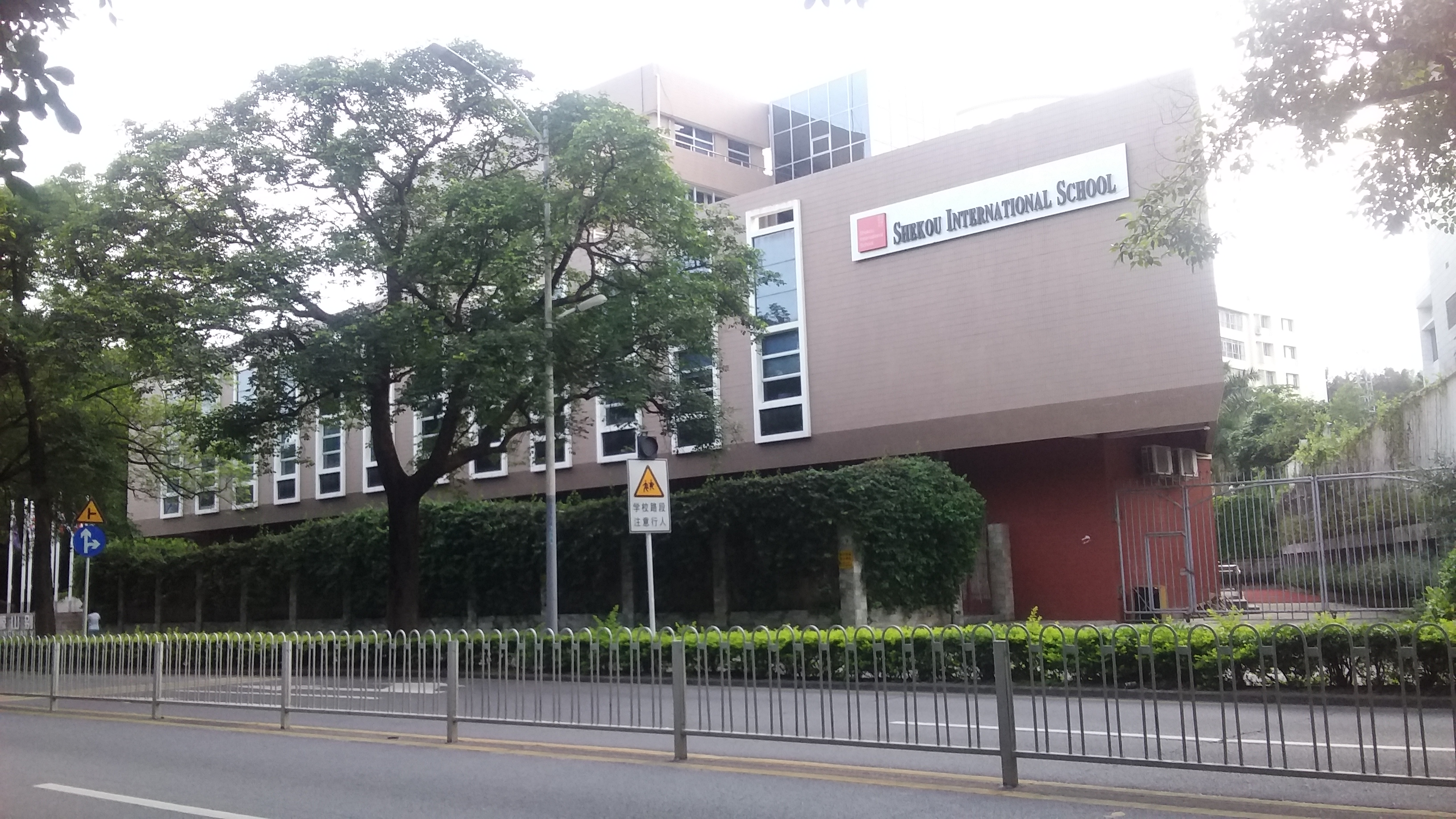
Shekou International School

Due to the intense competition and lack of student slots in public schools, many Shenzhen-based Chinese families have turned to international schools which had largely historically catered to foreign-born students. Other factors promoting international schools include an international orientation in the city's culture and a large population of people originating from outside Shenzhen, as well as the presence of Shenzhen-resident people with Hong Kong permanent residency. Real estate companies and financial groups have provided financial support to some international schools.

In 2011, there were more non-PRC citizens in the city, and so the international schools had more students.

As of 2016 there were seven international schools in Shenzhen which barred admission to Chinese citizens without foreign/Hong Kong/Macau citizenship or residency, while there were sixteen private schools officially designated by the municipal government as having "experimental" international curricula.

In the period fall 2014-fall, 2016 more than ten schools with international curricula opened. Zhang Qian of the Shenzhen Daily stated that the perceived quality of the schools differed and that many had "high" tuitions. The principal of C-UK College Shenzhen, Ding Hui, stated: "Because of market demand and inadequate regulation, there is almost no threshold for opening an international school if you have the financial backing." As of 2016 multiple educational institutions describing themselves as international schools were registered as full-time training organizations and lacked official licenses for international schools.

Zhang Qian stated that some schools had a lack of stability, with at least one closing one year after it opened and another changing ownership after six months of operation.

== Supplementary education ==
Shenzhen Saturday School (深・(ｼﾝｾﾝ)補習授業校 Shinsen Hoshū Jugyō Kō, formerly SHENZHEN日本人補習校), a Japanese weekend school, has its office on the 8th floor of the Jinsanjiao Building (金三角大厦/金三角大廈) in Baishizhou, Nanshan District. Previously it was based in the Ming Wah International Convention Centre (明华国际会议中心) in Shekou.

In addition, the Shenzhen Korean Chamber of Commerce and Industry organizes a Korean Saturday school because many Korean students are not studying in Korean-medium schools; the school had about 600 students in 2007. The chamber uses rented space in the OCT Primary School as the Korean weekend school's classroom.
