= Shenzhen Senior High School =

High school in Shenzhen, Guangdong, China

- Simplified Chinese: 深圳市高级中学
- Traditional Chinese: 深圳市高級中學
Transcriptions
Standard Mandarin
- Hanyu Pinyin: Shēnzhènshì Gāojízhōngxué
Yue: Cantonese
- Jyutping: sam1 zan3 si5 gou1 kap1 zung1 hok6

Shenzhen Senior High School (Chinese: 深圳市高级中学; pinyin: Shēnzhènshì Gāojízhōngxué), also known to its students as "Purple Castle" (紫色城堡), is a public high school located in Shenzhen, Guangdong, China. The school has campuses in Futian District, Longhua District, and Pingshan District.

== History ==
The Shenzhen Senior High School was founded in September 1997, with a building that housed ten classrooms. The school grew in size in September 2003, during which time, its north campus was constructed. The school merged with Shen Nan High School in May 2010, which subsequently served as its middle school facility. The school has since been noted as one of Shenzhen's "Four Famous Schools" (四大名校).

== School buildings ==
The school hosts 70 classrooms in seven hectares of land separated into four campuses: Central and South in Futian District, North in Longhua District, and East in Pingshan District. Its Futian campus is divided into two parts by crossroads. Senior One and Two students occupy the South Campus, whereas Senior Three and all students of the International Department occupy the North Campus.

Its South Campus houses three teaching buildings, a gender-segregated dormitory and houses various sport facilities, whereas its North Campus has a single teaching building along with gender-segregated dormitory two dormitories and sport facilities. Students taking the National College Entrance Examination (Gaokao) occupy a section of the school separated from the rest of the student body.

== Achievements ==
The school has been noted for its performance, in which its Senior High School Entrance Examination minimum passing score has risen from 600 in 2004 to 641 in 2007. The school has produced zhuangyuans in various subjects, including two each in the gaokao and liberal arts examinations as well as 15 in the single-subject examinations.

The school has accumulated five gold medals and three silver medals from its participation in the National Mathematical Olympiad and National Chemistry Olympiad throughout the years. Its performance in those events has led to instances in which select participating students were offered unconditional entry to Tsing Hua University, and Peking University.

In 2018, four students from the international division of the school won the group championship at the International History Bee and Bowl Shenzhen Division.

== Traditions ==
There is an annual tradition in which the majority of Senior Two students would live in the Jinggang Mountains for a week to engage and work with local farmers and students.

== Notable alumni ==
- Yu Deng, mathematician and winner of the Fields Medal (2026)
