= Shenzhen Experimental School =

- 深圳实验学校

Location
- No.66 Baihua 2nd Road Futian District; Shenzhen, Guangdong; China

Information
- Other name: SZSY
- Type: Public
- Motto: 励精图治 (Arouse All One's Efforts to Make the Country Prosperous)
- Established: 1985
- Founder: Jin Shiru
- Principal: Zhong Jinggao
- Staff: about 1,200
- Enrollment: about 10,000
- Campus: Shenzhen, Guangdong: Tongfa Road, Nanshan (High school); Baihua 6th Road, Futian (Secondary education); Baihua 7th Road, Futian (Middle school); Hongli Road, Futian (Elementary school); Baihua 5th Road, Futian (Kindergarten); Niushan Road, Guangming (Guangming Section)
- Color: Blue
- Website: szsy.cn

Shenzhen Experimental School (Chinese: 深圳实验学校; pinyin: Shēnzhèn Shíyàn Xuéxiào; also abbreviated as SZSY) is a public school in Shenzhen, which consists of five sections, high school, middle school, secondary school, elementary school and kindergarten.

Though founded relatively late in 1985, the school quickly gained its reputation as an elite school in Shenzhen as well as the nation.

== History ==
The school was established in 1985 with the middle school and high school at Baihua 6th Road campus and the elementary school at Hongli Road campus. In 1988, the kindergarten was opened at Baihua 5th Road campus. In 1998, the school merged with Huaqiang Middle School with the latter becoming the fourth campus. In 2001, the school took over the financially troubled Asia Pacific International School at Nanshan District and established a boarding school at that location. In 2002 the school made the decision to move all high school (grade 10-12) teachers and students at the original Baihua 6th Road campus to the new campus. The new campus then became the de facto high school though the Baihua 6th Road campus continues to maintain its own high school education with newly recruited teachers and students. Jing Shiru was the school's founding principal and retired in 2007. His successor was Cao Yanqing, who has retired in 2014. Current Principal is Zhong Jinggao.

== Campuses ==
The Shenzhen Experimental Education Group is headquartered in Futian District.

The school now maintains the following six campuses:

- High School: under the Guanlong Mountain at Xili Subdistrict, Nanshan District, near Shenzhen Polytechnic. All the students board.
- Secondary School: (Junior-Senior) Futian District, at Baihua 6th Road. This is the school's oldest campus and now maintains both middle and high school.
- Junior High School: Futian District, at Baihua 7th Road. This is the previous Huaqiang Middle School.
- Elementary school: Futian District, at Hongli Road.
- Kindergarten: at Baihua 5th Road, Futian District.
- Guangming Section: at Niushan Road, Guangming District, which is the previous Shenzhen NO.10 Middle School.

== Academic ==
The high school has strong performance in academics competitions. It is universally acknowledged as one of the Top 3 schools in Shenzhen.

== Sports ==
Sports are a major part of life at SZSY. There are extensive playing fields at all campuses, especially at the secondary education level. There is the Principal's Cup for both basketball and football, which are school-wide annual basketball and football cup competition with participating units consisting of academic class teams. The school also organizes annual field and track games at Shenzhen Stadium.

The school's sports teams, including:

- Boys' Soccer Team: Two Shenzhen Champion in 1995 and 2005. The team also won a 3rd place and 5th place twice in Guangdong.
- Boys' Basketball Team
- Boys' Volleyball Team
- Boys' Track and Field Team
- Girls' Soccer Team: 1st runner-up in Shenzhen.
- Girls' Basketball Team: 2001 2nd runner-up in Shenzhen.
- Girls' Volleyball Team: 2000 4th runner-up in Shenzhen.
- Girls' Track and Field Team

== Music and Drama ==
The Student Choir was founded in 1992. In 1995 the choir won the first prize in the 1995 Guiyang Chinese Choral Festival. In the same year, it performs with China Central Choir at Shenzhen Grand Theater to public. It has won many gold medals in the annual Shenzhen Choral Competition, including a four-peat during 1995-1999. The choir was also invited to attend Children's Choral Festival at Sydney Opera House in 1999.

The Students Philharmonic Orchestra was set up in 1993. It has become a large philharmonic orchestra with a combination and disposition of sound scales and fine musical instruments. The orchestra consists of two parts: the tube philharmonic orchestra, and the wind and string. There are over 80 players in the tube part, whilst more than 120 in the wind and string part. The orchestra had reached the standard of performing multiple master pieces, and has won two honors: the first prize of Instrumental Music Tutti in Guangdong Province High School Students Art Show and the first prize of Instrumental Music Tuttic in National High School Students Art Show in March, 2007. It has staged many exclusive concerts and won many prizes in a variety of competitions, and performed in many local important cultural events. The orchestra has been invited to perform in Australia, France, Korea, Hong Kong and Taiwan.

There are also Chinese and English drama performances at Chinese Week (Chinese: 语文周) and English Week (Chinese: 英语周) respectively. The high school's drama society was formed in 2005 mainly consisting of grade 10 and 11 students.

== Traditions ==
There are many special traditions in SZSY that are used to enhance students' abilities both mentally and physically. In addition to the Chinese and English drama performances mentioned above that occur every year, other crucial events include an Art Festival in which students from different clubs, such as dance clubs and singing clubs come out to perform what they practiced. A Science Festival, wherein students hand make da li shen and many other wood made pieces to compete on strength and flexibility by supporting very heavy iron rings. There is also an annual sport competition, which usually lasts two or three days in November. At the beginning of the New Year, students from all parts of SZSY, ranging from kindergarten to high school gather at the Shenzhen Stadium to perform Guang Bo Chao and receive cheers from all the parents and school heads from Shenzhen Sports Association.

== Notable alumni ==
- Laura Li, Miss Macau 2009
- Sire Ma, Miss Hong Kong Pageant 2008 2nd runner up
- Wang Yundi, Miss Chinese Cosmos Pageant France 2009
- Ma Qicheng, the first high school student from Shenzhen to attend Harvard

== In popular culture ==
- A 1999 TV series "Flowering Season.Rainy Season" (Chinese: 《花季·雨季》) was filmed at the school's Baihua 6th Road campus.

== See also ==
- Education in Shenzhen
