= Shenzhen Foreign Languages School =

Municipal public secondary school in Shenzhen, Guangdong, China

Coordinates: 22.5479°N 114.0936°E

- 深圳外国语学校

Information
- Type: Public secondary school
- Established: 1990
- Website: sfls.net.cn

Shenzhen Foreign Languages School (深圳外国语学校) is a municipal public secondary school in Shenzhen, Guangdong, China. The school is managed by the Shenzhen City Education Bureau. It was founded in December 1990. The school has three campuses, located in Futian, Yantian, and Longhua.

Shenzhen Foreign Languages School
- Simplified Chinese: 深圳外国语学校
- Traditional Chinese: 深圳外國語學校
Transcriptions
Standard Mandarin
- Hanyu Pinyin: Shēnzhèn Wàiguóyǔ Xuéxiào
Yue: Cantonese
- Jyutping: sam1 zan3 ngoi6 gwok3 jyu5 hok6 haau6

== History ==
In 1990, the Shenzhen Municipal People's Government established Shenzhen Foreign Languages School.

In 2002, Shenzhen Foreign Language School cooperated with Li Lang Yexing Industrial Co., Ltd. to establish Shenzhen Foreign Languages School Longgang Branch (深圳外国语学校龙岗高中部). The new branch was under the public-owned and private-run model.

In September 2003, the junior high school and senior high school of Shenzhen Foreign Languages School made campus separation arrangements. The junior high school is still located at its original location in Futian District; the senior high school has moved to Yantian District.

== See also ==
- List of foreign-language schools in China

== In popular culture ==
The Chinese television drama Too Young to Grow Old was inspired by the real-life experiences of the director, Lanxin Yu, who attended the Shenzhen Foreign Languages School. The series follows the lives of the students and teachers at the school and the new generation of youth in Shenzhen. It premiered on iQIYI on 22 January 2025.
