= Gangxia station =

Metro station in Shenzhen, Guangdong, China

Coordinates: 22°32′16″N 114°03′47″E

Gangxia 岗厦
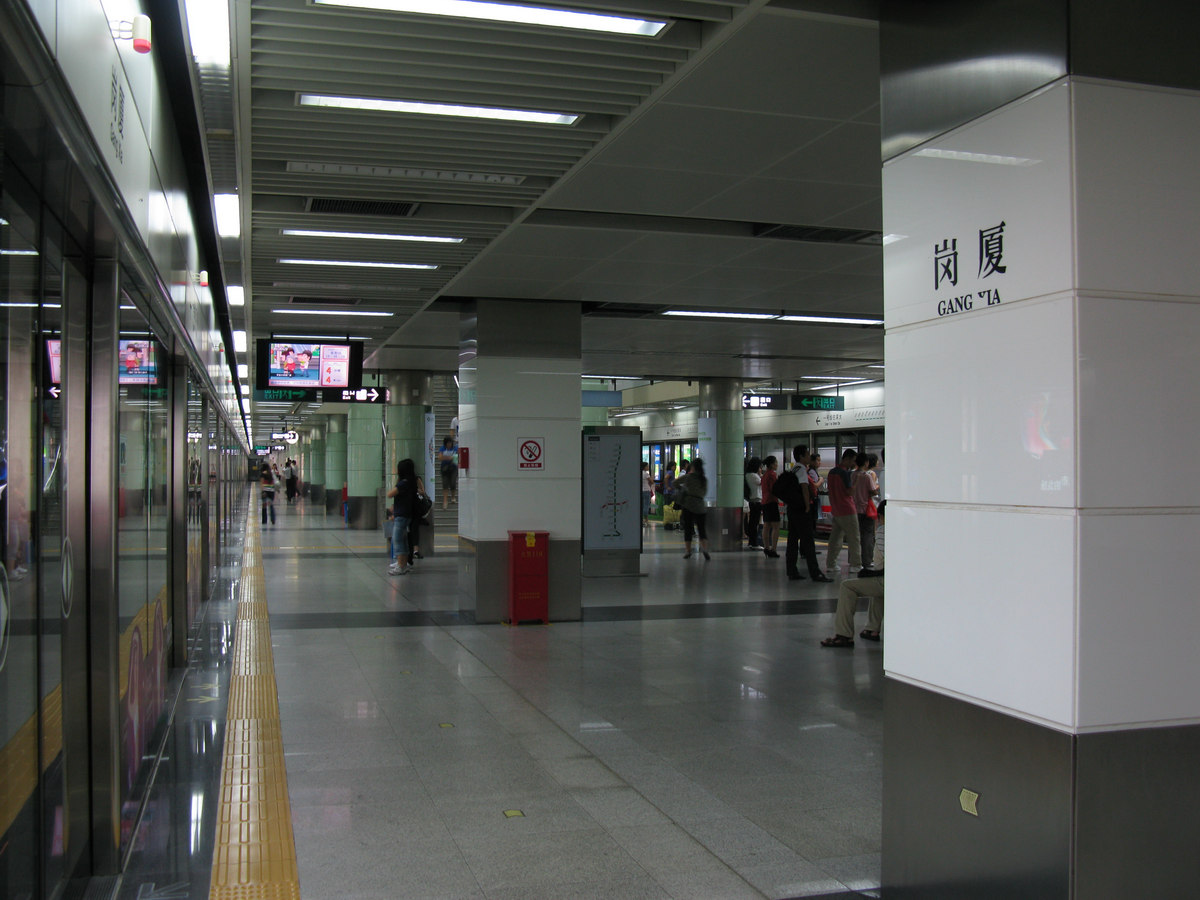

Chinese name
- Traditional Chinese: 崗廈
- Simplified Chinese: 岗厦
Transcriptions
Standard Mandarin
- Hanyu Pinyin: Gǎngxià
Yue: Cantonese
- Jyutping: Gong1Haa6

General information
- Location: Futian District, Shenzhen, Guangdong; China
- Operated by: SZMC (Shenzhen Metro Group)
- Lines: Line 1; Line 10
- Platforms: 4 (2 island platforms)
- Tracks: 4

Construction
- Structure type: Underground
- Accessible: Yes

Other information
- Station code: 124 (Line 1); 1022 (Line 10)

History
- Opened: Line 1: 28 December 2004; 21 years ago Line 10: 18 August 2020; 5 years ago

Services
Preceding station	Shenzhen Metro	Following station
Convention and Exhibition Center towards Airport East	Line 1	Huaqiang Road towards Luohu
Gangxia North towards Shuangyong Street	Line 10	Fumin towards Futian Checkpoint
Location

Gangxia station (simplified Chinese: 岗厦站; traditional Chinese: 崗廈站; pinyin: Gǎngxià Zhàn; Jyutping: Gong1 Haa6 Zaam6) is a station of Line 1 and Line 10 of the Shenzhen Metro. Line 1 platforms opened on 28 December 2004 and Line 10 platforms opened on 18 August 2020. It is located underground at the junction of Fuhua Road (simplified Chinese: 福华路; traditional Chinese: 福華路) and Caituan Road (Chinese: 彩田路) in Futian District, Shenzhen, China. It mainly serves the nearby residential buildings.

== Station layout ==
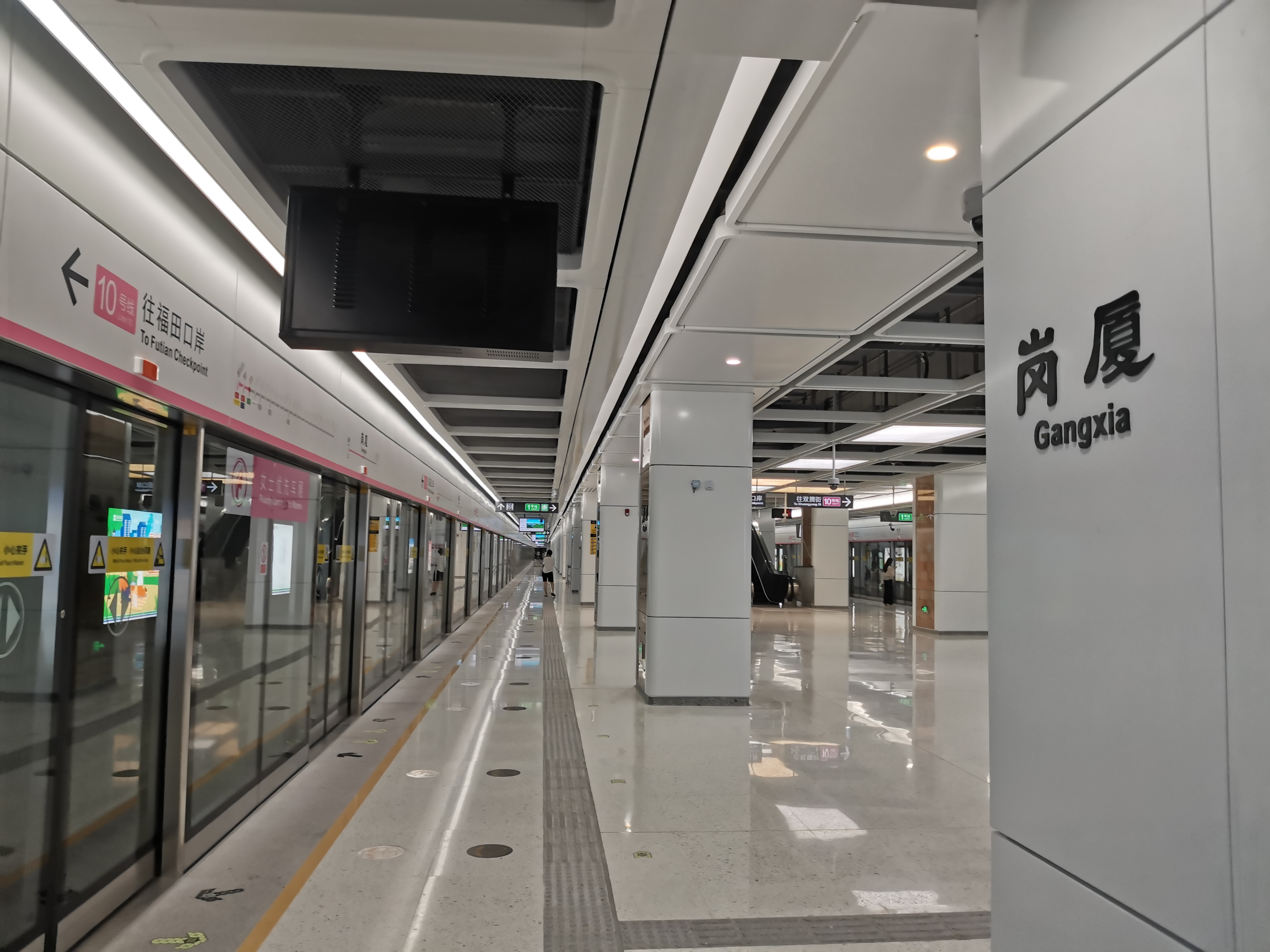
Line 10 platform facing south

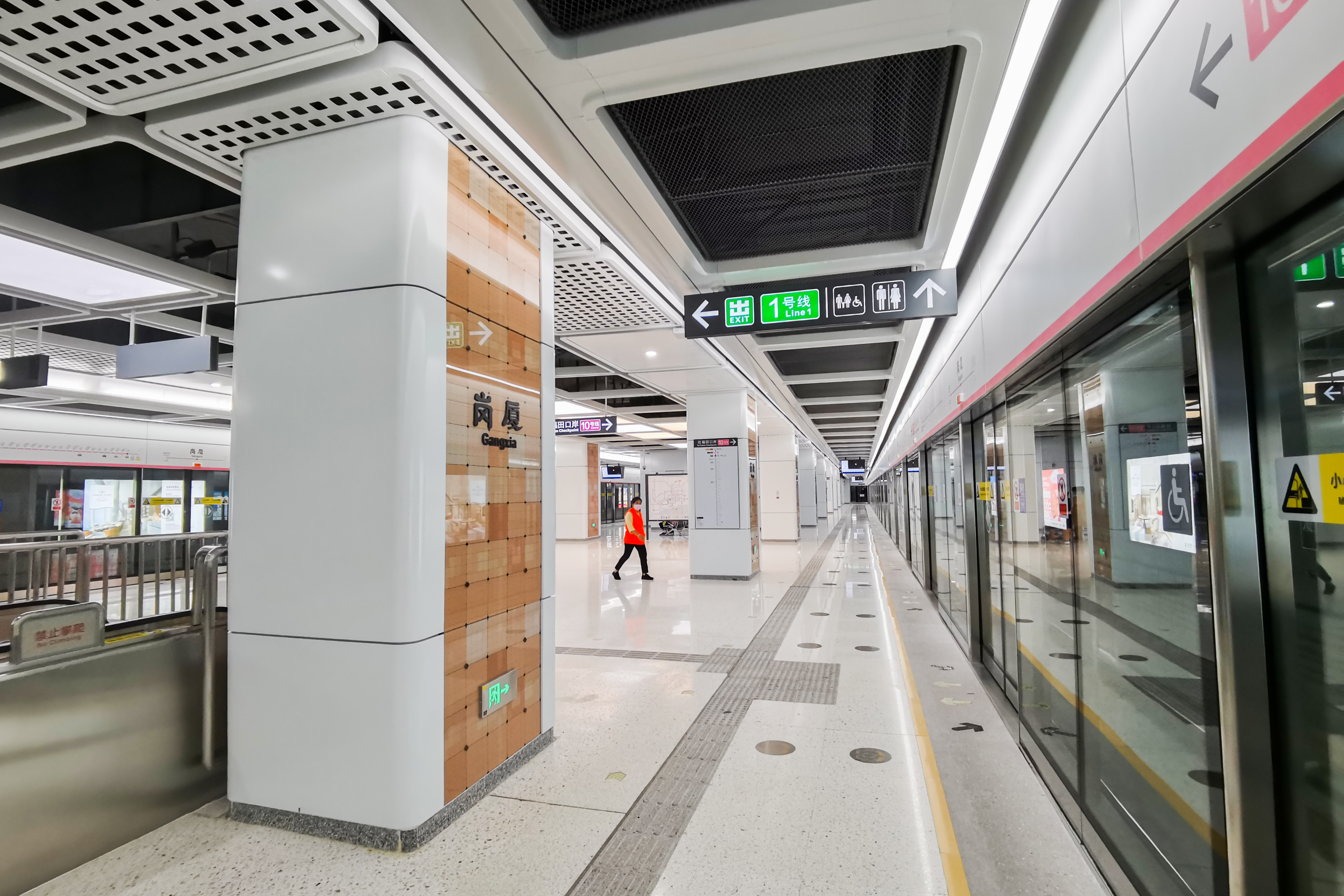
Line 10 platform facing north

G	-	Exit
B1F; Concourse	Lobby	Customer Service, Shops, Vending machines, ATMs
B2F; Platforms	Platform 1	← Line 1 towards Airport East (Convention and Exhibition Center)
B2F; Platforms	Island platform, doors will open on the left
B2F; Platforms	Platform 2	→ Line 1 towards Luohu (Huaqiang Road) →
B3F; Platforms	Platform	← Line 10 towards Futian Checkpoint (Fumin)
B3F; Platforms	Island platform, doors will open on the left
B3F; Platforms	Platform	→ Line 10 towards Shuangyong Street (Gangxia North) →

== Exits ==
Exit	Destination
Exit A	East Side of Caitian Road (N), North Side of Fuhua Road (E), Shennan Boulevard (Luohu Direction), HOBA (Caitian Store), Shenzhen Central Park, Gangxia Village, Shenzhen Gangxia Primary School, Caihong Building (Caihong Xindu), Haiying Building, Wenwei Building, Youdian Building, Gaokeli Building, Gangxia Paifang, Shenda Xincun, Futian Police Office, Jindun Theater
Exit B	West Side of Caitian Road (S), North Side of Fuhua Road (W), Galaxy 3Road Space, Caifu Building, Shu&Yu Dentistry, Jialin Haoting, Futian Tea Wholesale Center, Galaxy Century
Exit C	South Side of Fuhua Road (W), Gangxia Middle School, Xincheng Garden, Shenzhen Technician Institute (transfer for bus), Xinzhou Village (transfer for bus), Fortune Building, Modern International, Wyndham Grand, Zhaobangji Commercial Building, Ludeng Building, Hansen Building (Currently Under Repair)
Exit D	Wyndham Grand, Hansen Building, Jingdi Building, Zhaobangji Commercial Building, Excellence Century Center
Exit E	Haitian Complex Building, Fujian Building, Aoxinya Building, Zhongshen Garden, Futian Union Square
Exit F	KFC, Yunhong Building
Exit G	Jiangsu Hotel, Guofeng Building
