= Shenzhen Mosque =

Mosque in Shenzhen, Guangdong, China

- 深圳清真寺
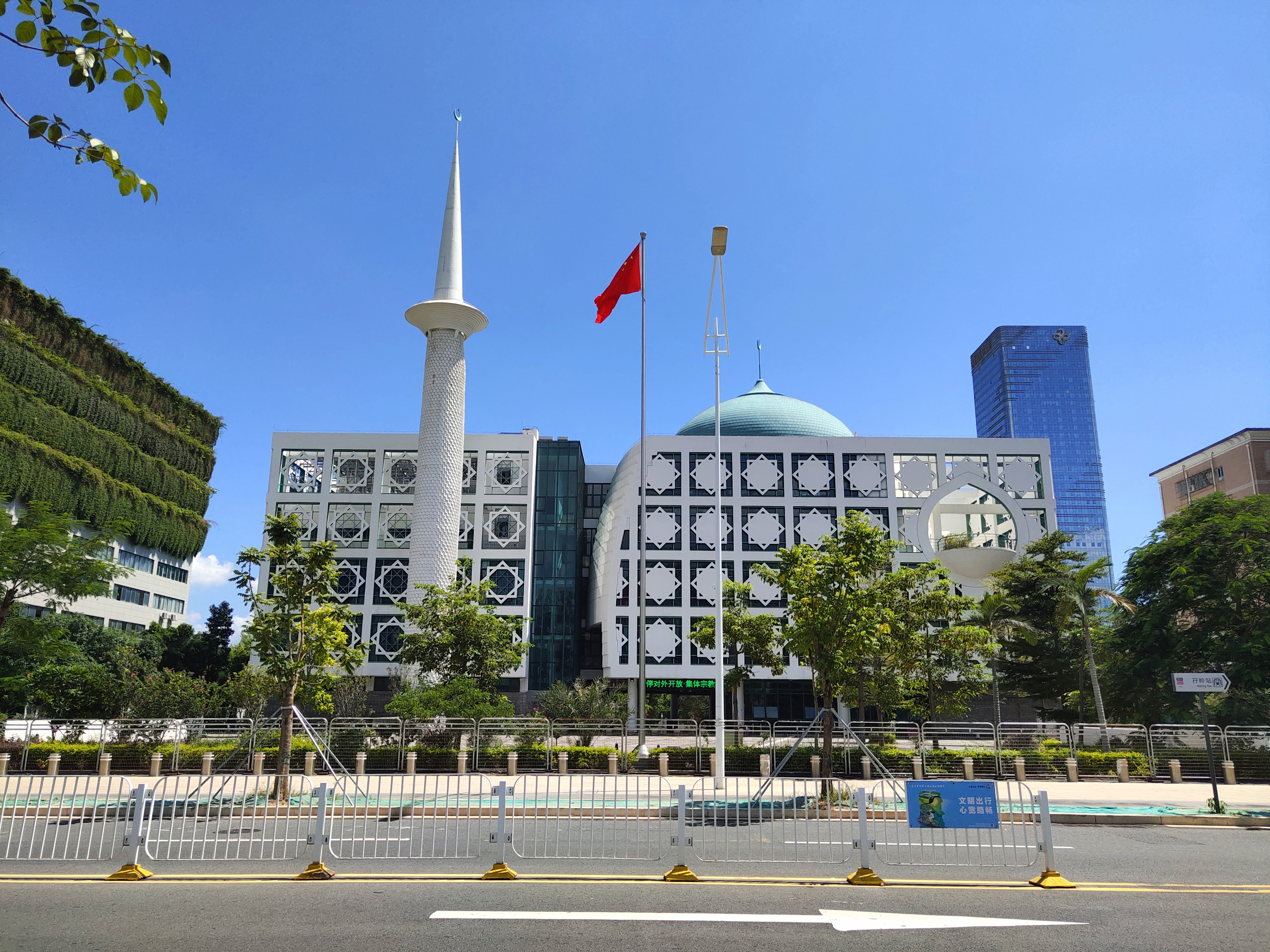

- Location of the mosque in Guangdong

Religion
- Affiliation: Sunni Islam
- Ecclesiastical or organisational status: Mosque
- Status: Active

Location
- Location: Futian, Shenzhen, Guangdong
- Country: China
- Interactive map of Shenzhen Mosque
- Coordinates: 22°34′14″N 114°3′54″E

Architecture
- Type: Mosque
- Style: Islamic
- Completed: 2013

Specifications
- Dome: 1 (maybe more)
- Minaret: 1
- Site area: 3,000 m^{2} (32,000 sq ft)

The Shenzhen Mosque (Chinese: 深圳清真寺; pinyin: Shēnzhèn Qīngzhēnsì) is a mosque in Futian District, Shenzhen, in the Guangdong Province of China.

== Architecture ==
Completed in 2013 with a total area of 3,000 square metres (32,000 sq ft), it is the largest mosque in Shenzhen and is home to Muslim Association of Shenzhen. It consists of the main prayer hall, bunker building, wudu, garden etc. It was constructed in the Islamic architecture style.

== Transportation ==
The mosque is accessible within walking distance east of Shangmeilin Station of Shenzhen Metro, or from Exit B (turn 180° after exiting) of Maling Station of Shenzhen Metro Line 9 or Line 10, with Line 9 having a shorter path to Exit B of Maling Station than Line 10.

== See also ==
Shenzhen Mosque
- Chinese: 深圳清真寺
Transcriptions
Standard Mandarin
- Hanyu Pinyin: Shēnzhèn Qīngzhēnsì
Yue: Cantonese
- Jyutping: sam1 zan3 cing1 zan1 zi6*2

- Islam in China
- List of mosques in China
