= Donggualing station =

Metro station in Shenzhen, Guangdong, China

Coordinates: 22°35′43″N 114°7′49″E

Donggualing 冬瓜岭
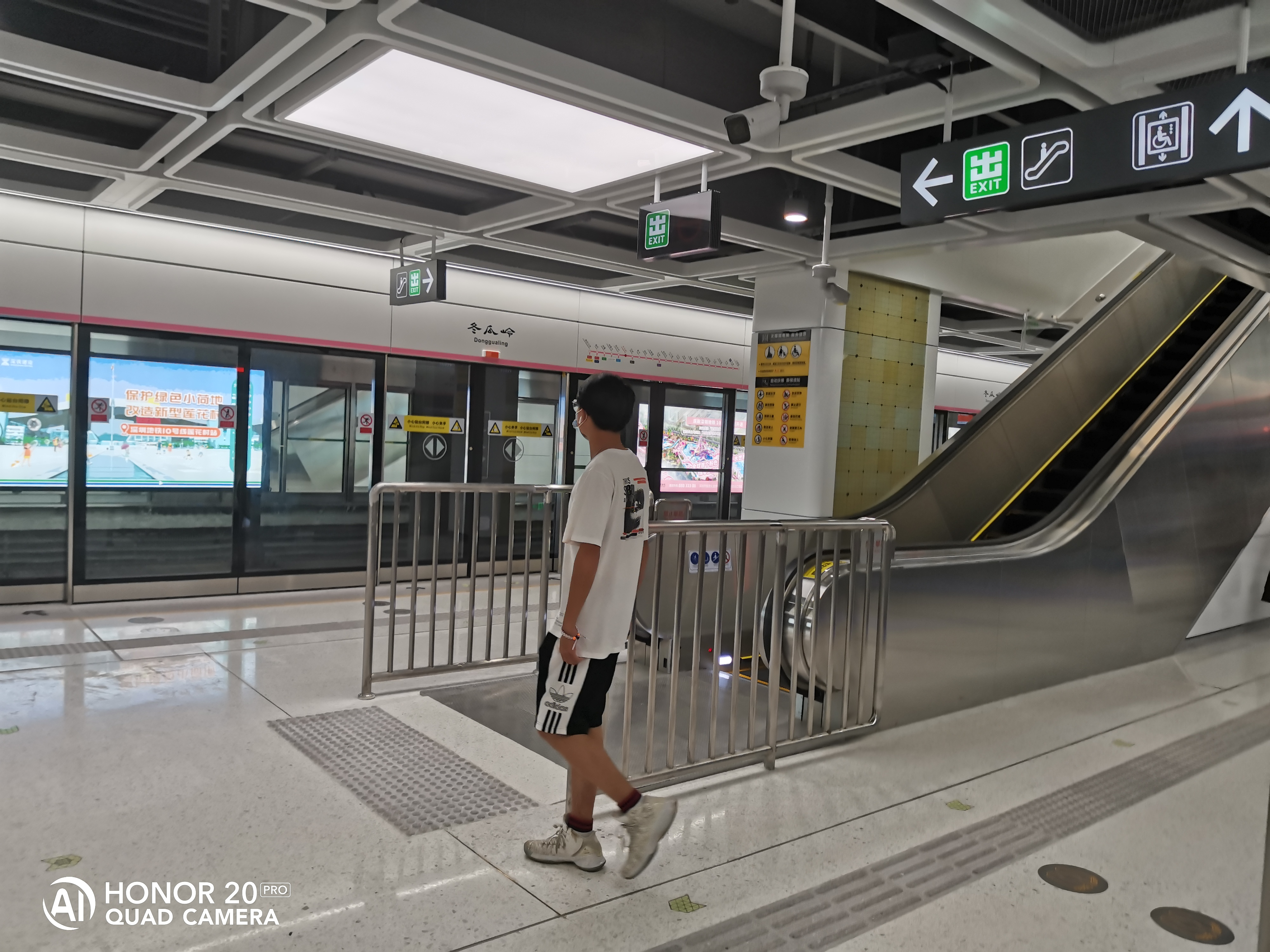
- Island platform

General information
- Location: Futian District, Shenzhen, Guangdong; China
- Operated by: SZMC (Shenzhen Metro Group)
- Line: Line 10
- Platforms: 3 (1 island platform and 1 side platform)
- Tracks: 3

Construction
- Structure type: Underground
- Accessible: Yes

History
- Opened: 18 August 2020

Services
Preceding station	Shenzhen Metro	Following station
Maling towards Shuangyong Street	Line 10	Lianhuacun towards Futian Checkpoint
Location

Donggualing station (Chinese: 冬瓜岭站; pinyin: Dōngguālǐng Zhàn) is a metro station on Line 10 of the Shenzhen Metro. It opened on 18 August 2020.

== Station layout ==
G	-	Exit
B1F; Concourse	Lobby	Customer Service, Shops, Vending machines, ATMs
B2F; Platforms	Side platform, doors will open on the right
B2F; Platforms	Platform	← Line 10 towards Futian Checkpoint (Lianhuacun)
B2F; Platforms	Platform	→ No regular service
B2F; Platforms	Island platform, doors will open on the left
B2F; Platforms	Platform	→ Line 10 towards Shuangyong Street (Maling) →

== Exits ==
Exit	Destination
Exit A	UpperHills
Exit B	Shenzhen Kaifa Technology Co., Ltd, Real Estate Registration Center, Lianke 3rd Rd
Exit C	Caitian Yise Garden, Feicui Mingyuan, Caitian Park, Minningyuan
Exit D	Shenzhen Municipal Intermediate People's Court, Shenzhen Cable TV Station, Caitian Village

== Gallery ==
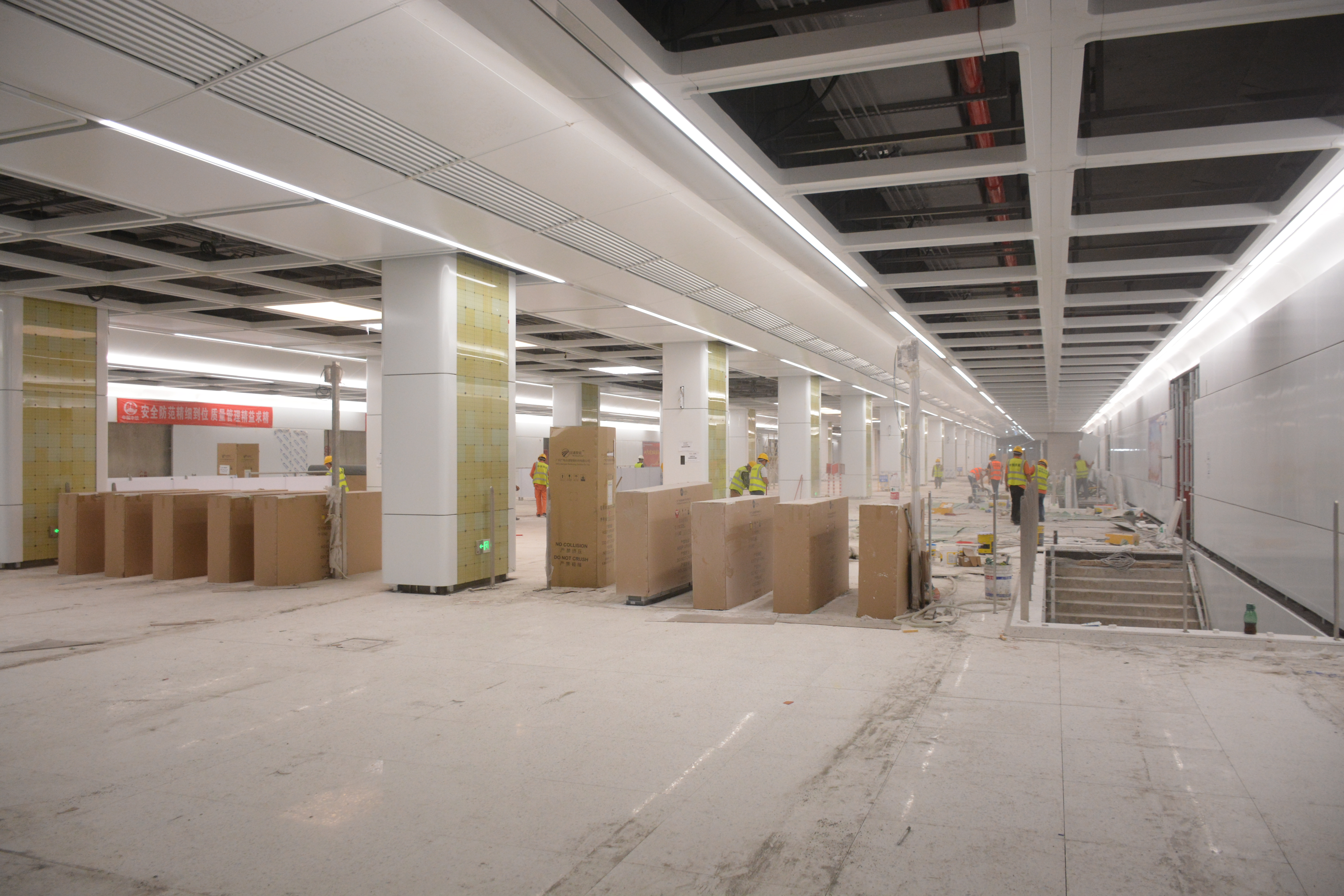
Station concourse under construction

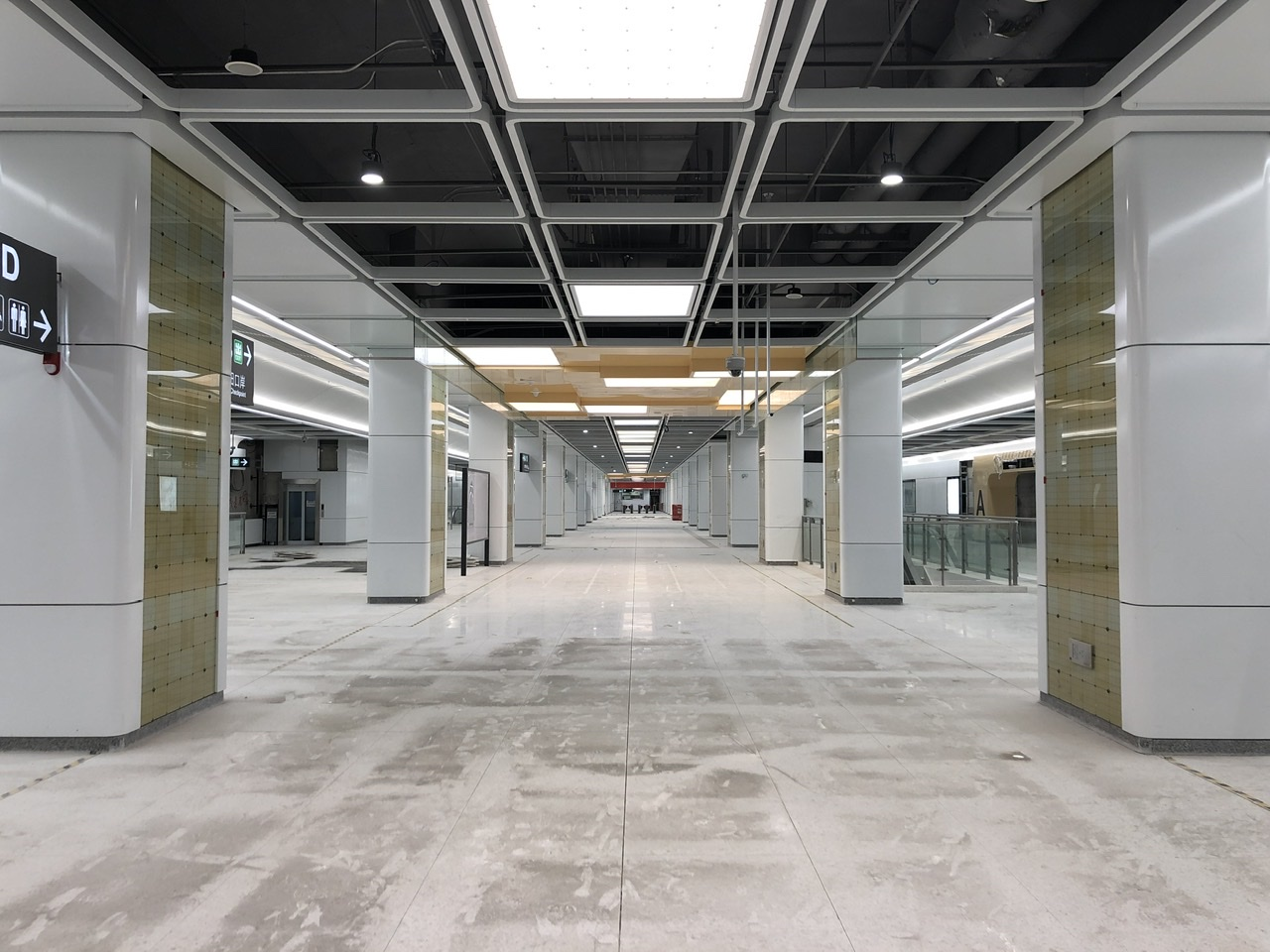

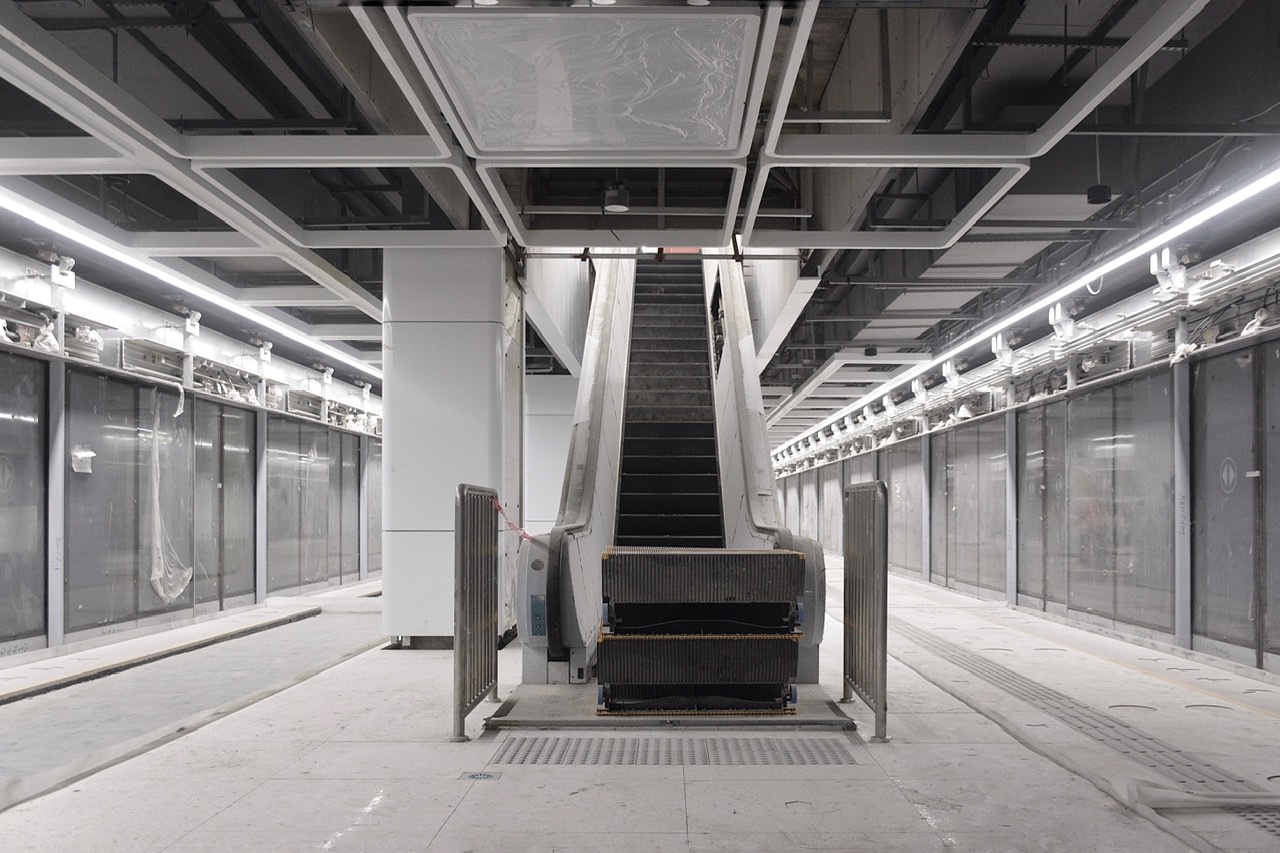
Station platform under construction

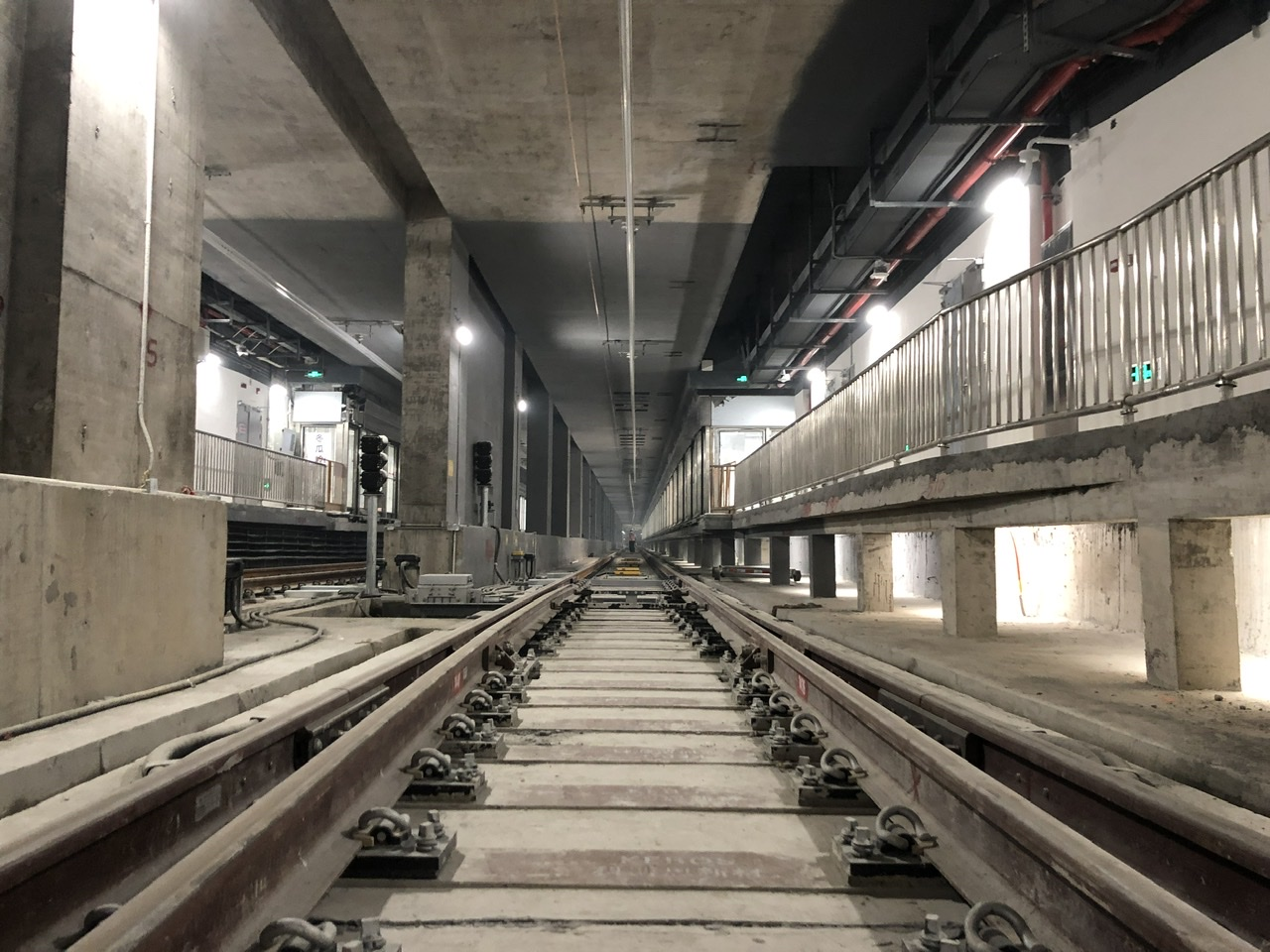
Train tracks before official opening

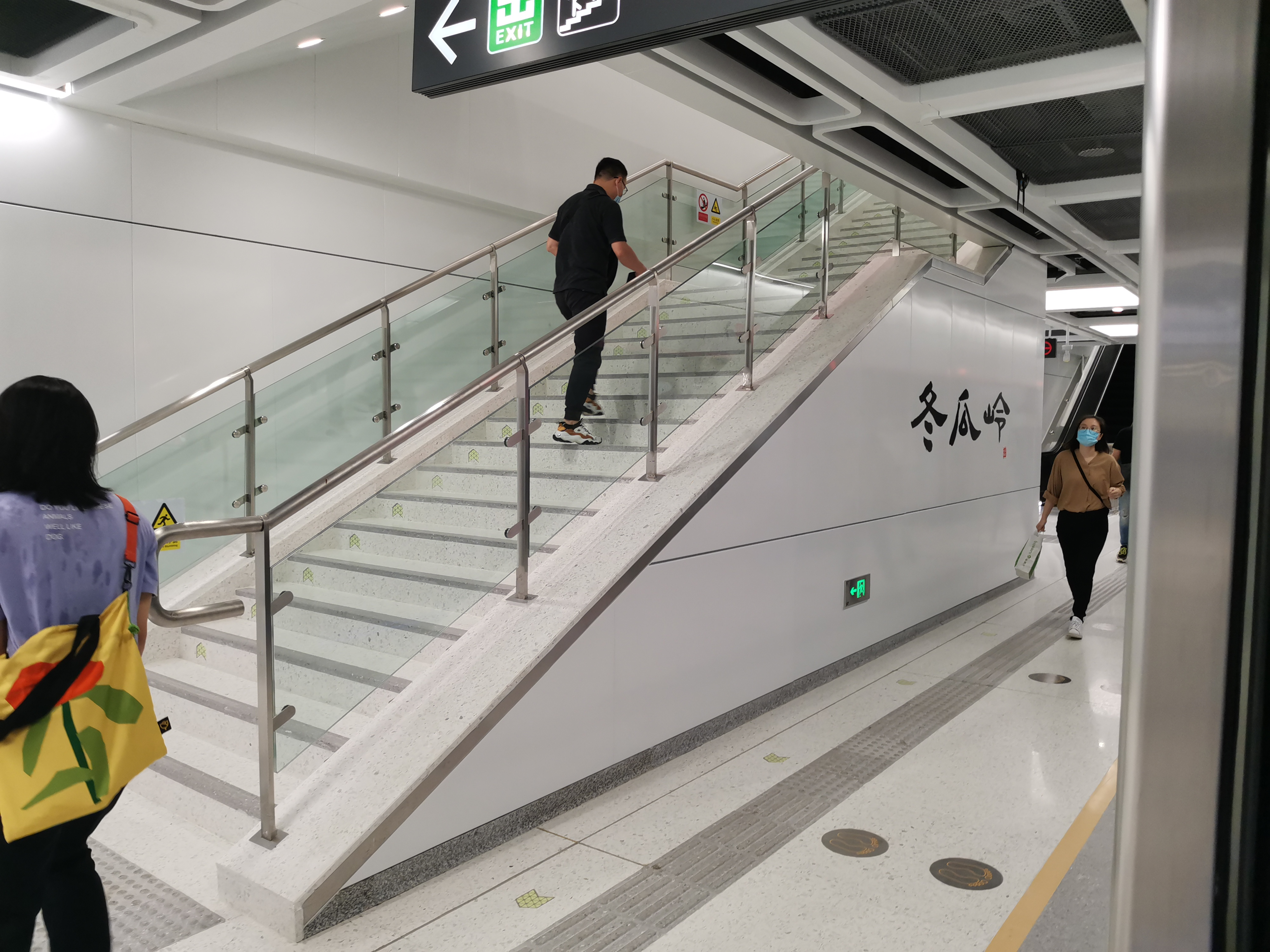
Side platform after opening
