= Futian station =

Railway and metro interchange station in Shenzhen, Guangdong, China

Futian 福田
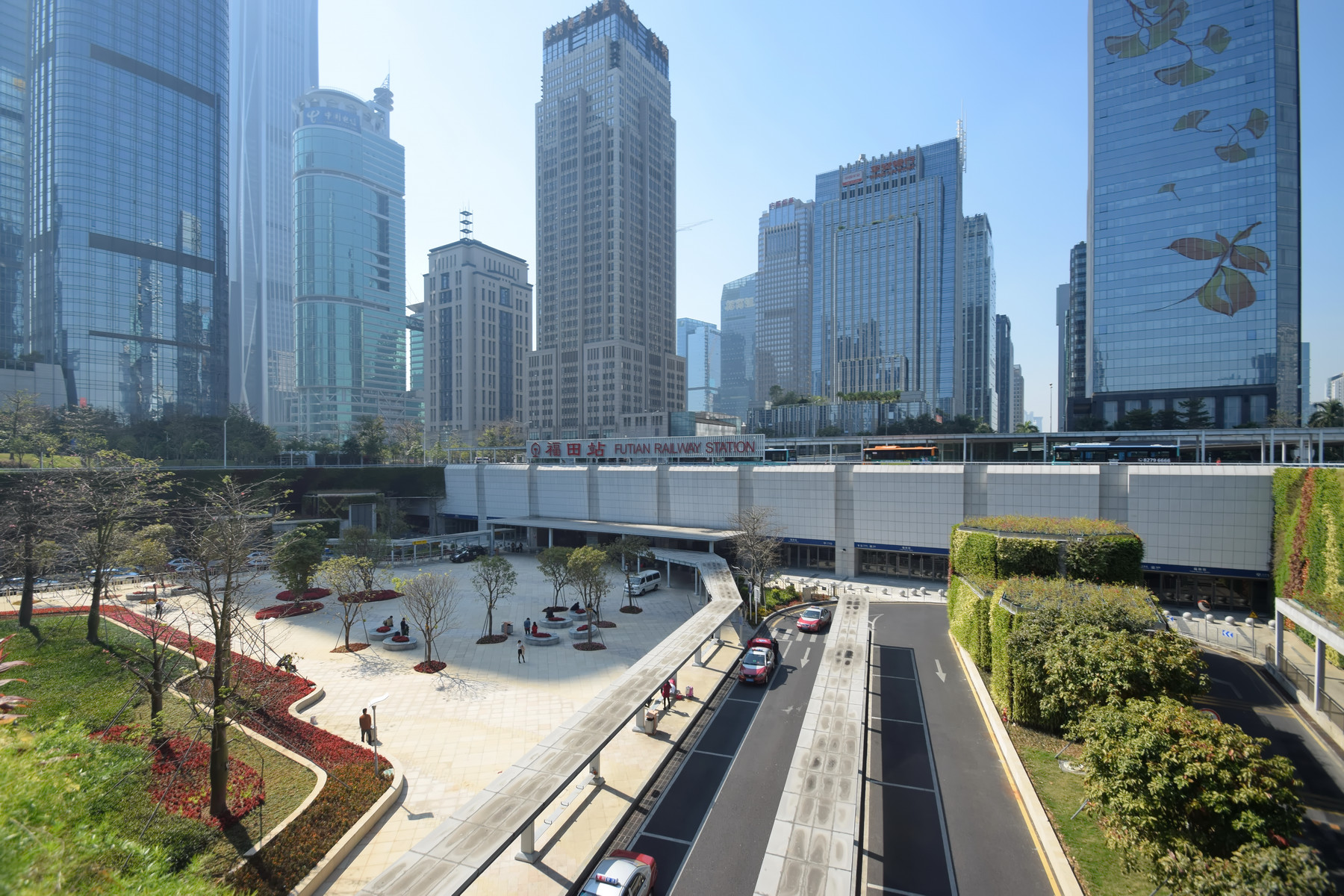
- Sunken plaza outside Futian station, 2018

General information
- Location: Shennan Road × Yitian Road, Futian District, Shenzhen, Guangdong; China
- Coordinates: 22°32′18″N 114°03′24″E
- Operator: CR Guangzhou; Shenzhen Metro
- Lines: Guangzhou–Shenzhen–Hong Kong XRL; Line 2; Line 3; Line 11
- Platforms: China Railway: 8 (4 island platforms); Shenzhen Metro: 6 (2 island platforms and 2 side platforms)
- Tracks: China Railway: 8 Shenzhen Metro: 6

Construction
- Structure type: Underground
- Accessible: Yes

Other information
- Station code: TMIS code: 65891; Telegraph code: NZQ; Pinyin code: FTI; 221 (Shenzhen Metro Line 2)
- Classification: 2nd class station

History
- Opened: 28 June 2011; 15 years ago (Metro station, Lines 2 and 3); 28 June 2016; 10 years ago (Line 11)

Key dates
- China Railway opened: 30 December 2015

Services
Preceding station	Shenzhen Metro	Following station
Lianhua West towards Chiwan	Line 2	Civic Center towards Liantang (Line 8: Xichong)
Children's Palace towards Pingdi Liulian	Line 3	Shopping Park towards Futian Bonded Area
Chegongmiao towards Bitou	Line 11	Gangxia North towards Hongling South
Preceding station	China Railway High-speed	Following station
Shenzhen North towards Guangzhou South	Guangzhou–Shenzhen–Hong Kong XRL	Hong Kong West Kowloon Terminus
Location
- Location within Guangdong Location within China

Futian station (Chinese: 福田站; pinyin: Fútián Zhàn; Jyutping: Fuk1 Tin4 Zaam6) is an underground China Railway High-speed and Shenzhen Metro station in Futian District, Shenzhen, Guangdong, China. It is on the Guangzhou–Shenzhen–Hong Kong Express Rail Link and is the last mainland Chinese station before the line enters Hong Kong. The China Railway portion opened on 30 December 2015, initially with high-speed services to Guangzhou South, while the adjoining metro station serves Shenzhen Metro Lines 2, 3 and 11.

The station is beneath the intersection of Shennan Road and Yitian Road in Shenzhen's central business district. It was planned as an underground urban stop on the Guangzhou-Shenzhen-Hong Kong high-speed railway, with convenient interchange to multiple metro lines rather than a large surface station square. Railway Gazette International described it at opening as Asia's largest underground station, measuring about 1,000 m (3,300 ft) by 80 m (260 ft), with eight high-speed platforms about 32 m (105 ft) below ground.

== History ==
In December 2005, officials of the former Ministry of Railways proposed adding a city-centre underground station in Shenzhen to the Guangzhou-Shenzhen-Hong Kong railway project. Several possible locations were studied, including Yitian Road, Central Park, Gangxia North, Chegongmiao and Xiangmihu. On 22 August 2006, Shenzhen mayor Xu Zongheng and vice railway minister Lu Chunfang signed a memorandum in Beijing confirming an underground station at Yitian Road in Futian.

Construction of Futian station and the associated Futian transport hub began on 20 August 2008. The station had originally been expected to open earlier in the 2010s, but the opening was delayed. Trial operation began in November 2015, and China Railway service began on 30 December 2015.

At opening, the station handled 11 pairs of trains a day between Futian and Guangzhou South, with the fastest scheduled journey to Guangzhou South taking about 50 minutes including intermediate stops. On 15 May 2016, a national timetable change extended two Changsha South-Shenzhen North train pairs to Futian, giving the station its first long-distance high-speed trains beyond Guangdong. The same change increased the station's daily train pairs from 23 to 28 and reduced the scheduled Futian-Shenzhen North running time from 11 minutes to 8 minutes.

The Hong Kong section of the Guangzhou-Shenzhen-Hong Kong Express Rail Link opened to the public on 23 September 2018. The Hong Kong section is a roughly 26 km (16 mi) underground railway from West Kowloon that connects to the mainland high-speed network through Futian. Cross-boundary high-speed rail service was suspended from 30 January 2020 during the COVID-19 pandemic and resumed progressively from 15 January 2023.

Subsequent timetable changes increased the station's role in central Shenzhen services. A July 2025 timetable added 12 trains between Futian and Guangzhou East. Under the national railway timetable scheduled to take effect on 1 July 2026, Futian was planned to handle 216 EMU train movements a day, and several services formerly starting at Shenzhen North were to start at Futian instead.

== Station layout ==
Futian station has three underground levels. The first underground level is a transport interchange and concourse for high-speed rail and metro passengers, with ticketing, ticket machines and passenger facilities. The second underground level contains the high-speed rail waiting and ticket-checking areas and the Shenzhen Metro concourse. The third underground level contains the high-speed rail platforms, while Shenzhen Metro platforms for Lines 2, 3 and 11 occupy adjoining underground levels within the interchange complex.

The China Railway portion has eight tracks and four island platforms. Tracks 1 to 4 are stub-end platform tracks mainly used by trains originating or terminating at Futian, while tracks 5 to 8 serve through cross-boundary and longer-distance trains on the Guangzhou-Shenzhen-Hong Kong Express Rail Link.

In early 2026, a new intelligent sliding platform-screen-door system entered service on platforms 1 to 4. Southern Metropolis Daily reported that the system used train-type recognition and sensors to adapt to varying EMU door positions, and that the change shortened passenger boarding time by about five minutes on affected platforms.

=== High-speed rail ===
B1F; Concourse	Transport interchange	Shenzhen Metro transfer area, high-speed rail ticket office, ticket machines, toilets, taxi access and underground commercial passage
B2F; Waiting hall	High-speed rail hall	Security screening, ticket gates, waiting areas, toilets and drinking-water facilities
B3F; Platforms
B3F; Platforms	←Towards Hong Kong West Kowloon	Towards Guangzhou South/Shenzhen North→
B3F; Platforms	West
B3F; Platforms	Platform 8	Long-distance and cross-boundary trains→
B3F; Platforms	Island platform, doors may open on either side
B3F; Platforms	Platform 7	Long-distance and cross-boundary trains→
B3F; Platforms	Platform 6	←Long-distance and cross-boundary trains
B3F; Platforms	Island platform, doors may open on either side
B3F; Platforms	Platform 5	←Long-distance and cross-boundary trains
B3F; Platforms	Platform 4	Guangzhou-Shenzhen intercity trains originating or terminating→
B3F; Platforms	Island platform, doors may open on either side
B3F; Platforms	Platform 3	Guangzhou-Shenzhen intercity trains originating or terminating→
B3F; Platforms	Platform 2	Guangzhou-Shenzhen intercity trains originating or terminating→
B3F; Platforms	Island platform, doors may open on either side
B3F; Platforms	Platform 1	Guangzhou-Shenzhen intercity trains originating or terminating→
B3F; Platforms	East

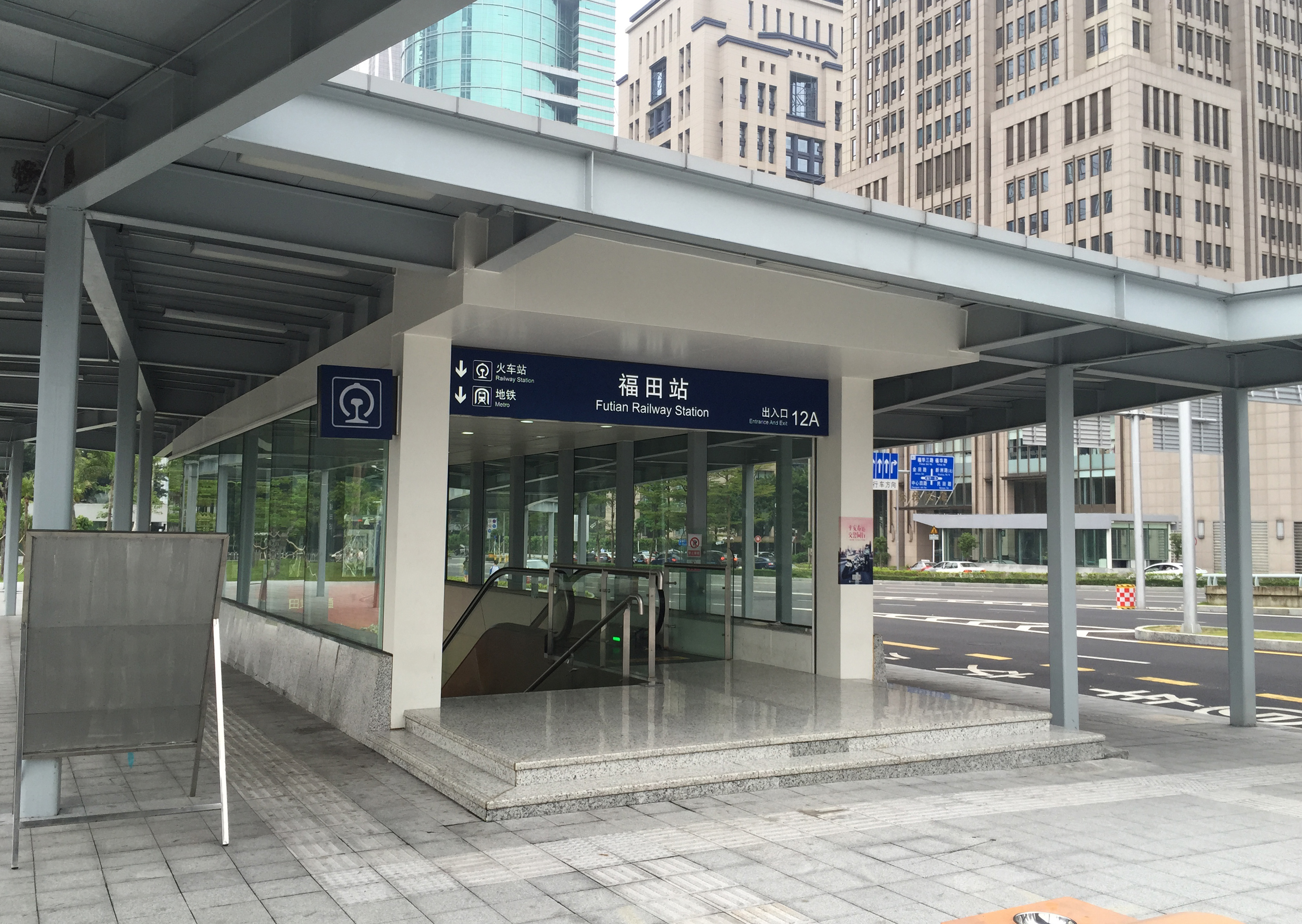
Exit 12A

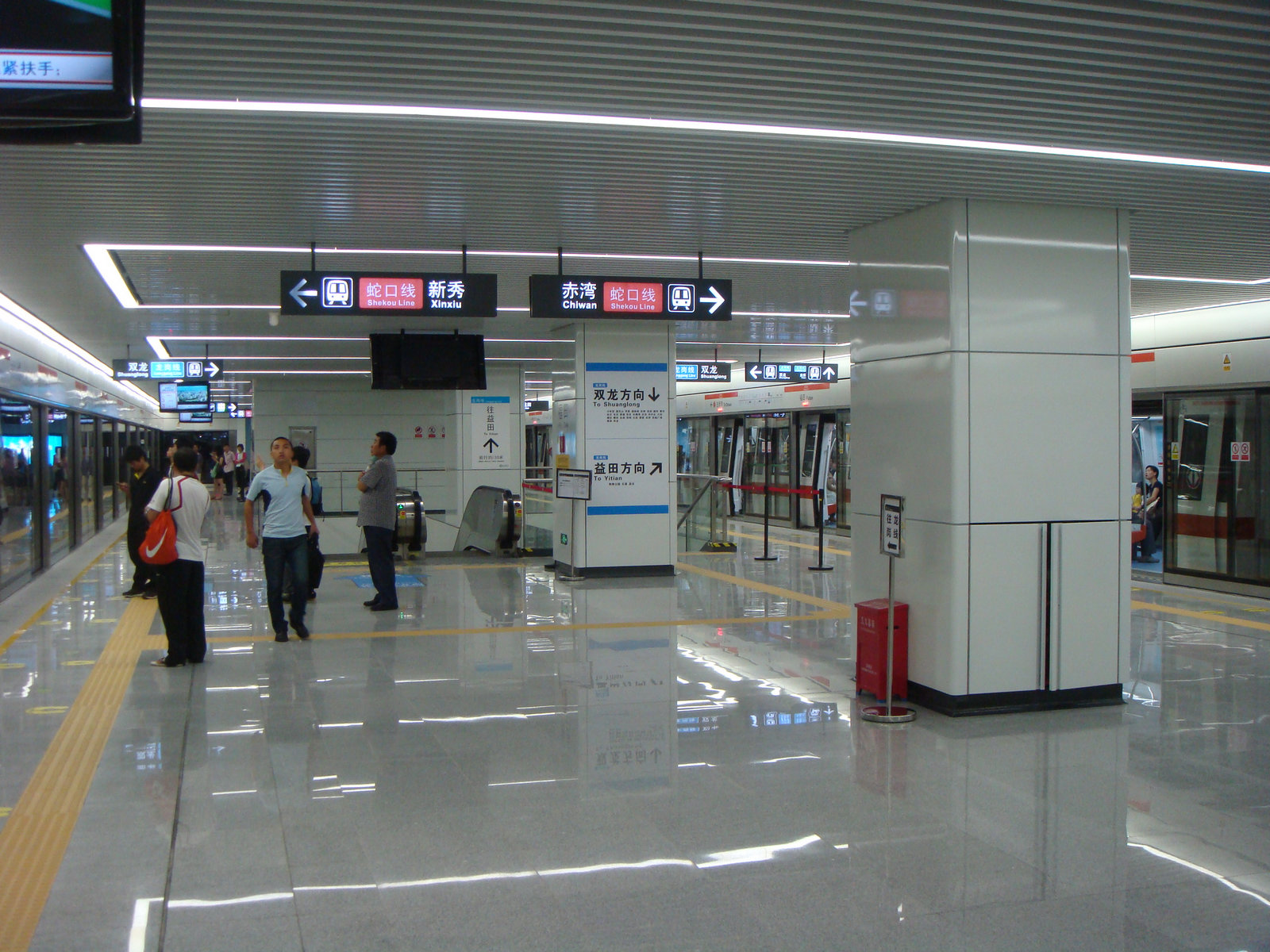
Shenzhen Metro Line 2 platforms

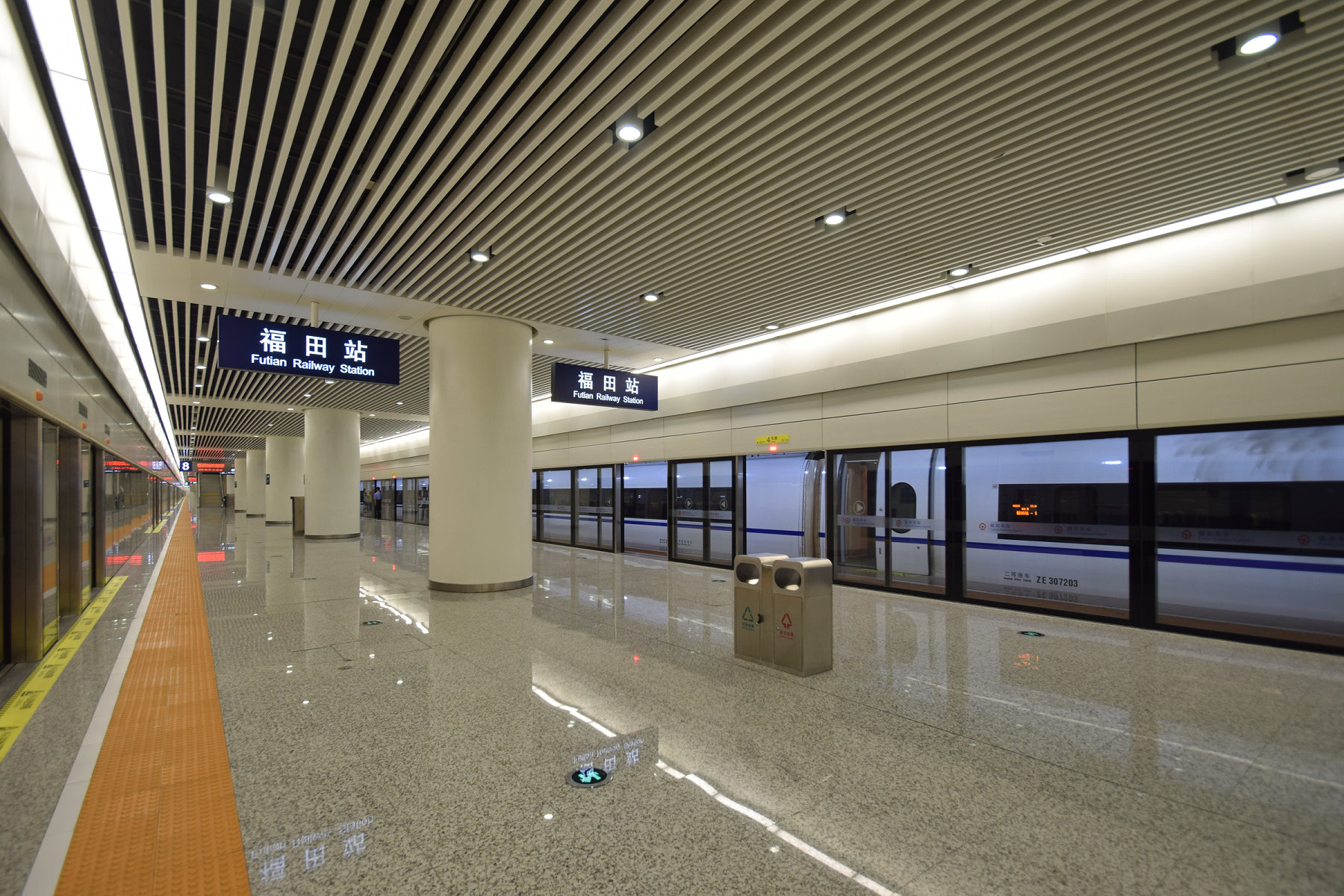
CRH platforms 7 and 8

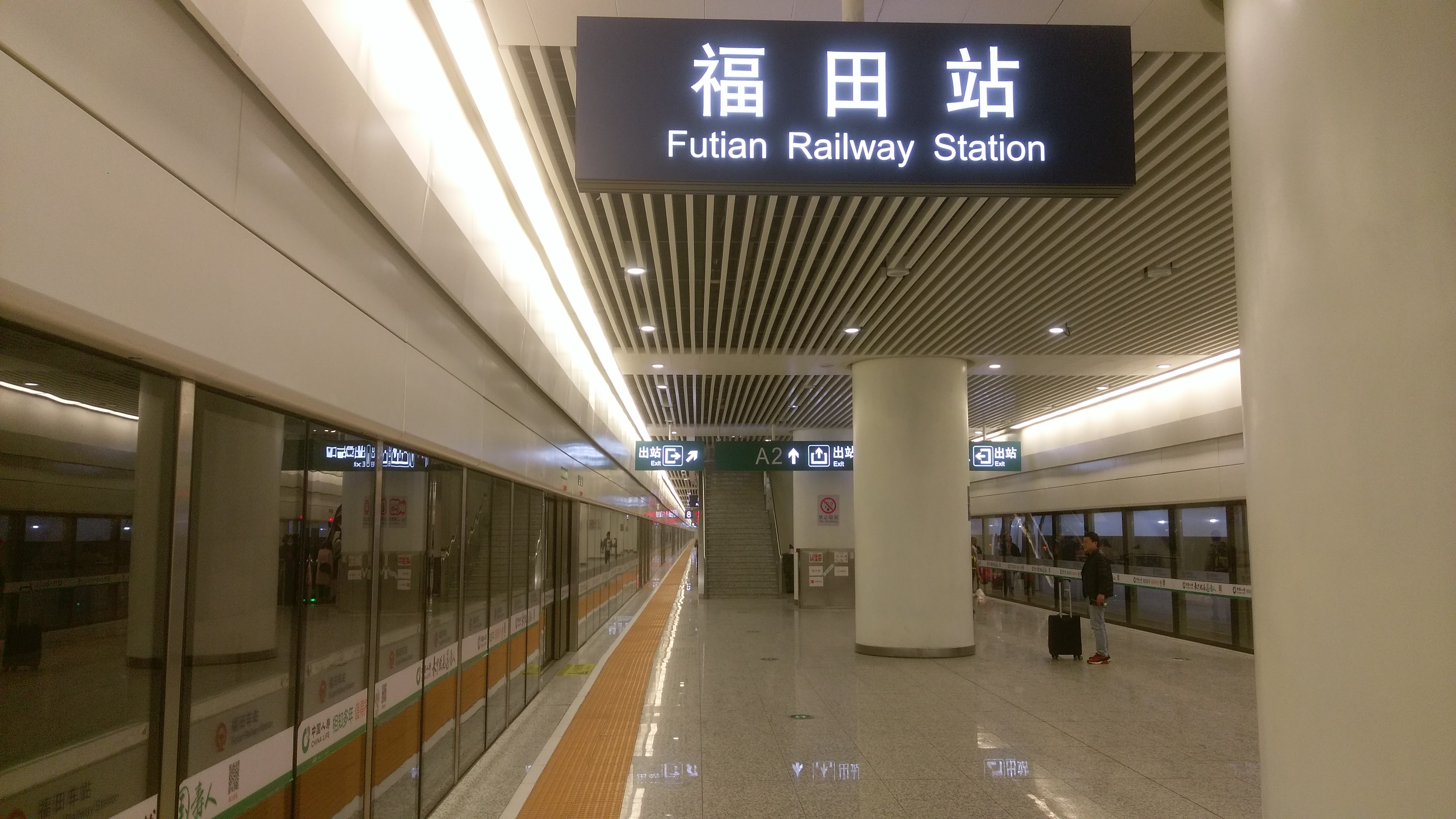
CRH platforms 7 and 8

=== Shenzhen Metro ===
Ground	-	Exits
B1F; Concourse	Lobby	Ticket machines, customer service, shops, vending machines and security screening
B2F; Platforms		2 towards Chiwan (Lianhua West)
B2F; Platforms	Island platform, doors open on the left
B2F; Platforms		8 towards Xichong (Civic Center)
B2F; Platforms		11 towards Bitou (Chegongmiao)
B2F; Platforms	Island platform, doors open on the left
B2F; Platforms		11 towards Hongling South (Gangxia North)
B3F; Platforms	Side platform, doors open on the right
B3F; Platforms		3 towards Futian Bonded Area (Shopping Park)
B3F; Platforms		3 towards Pingdi Liulian (Children's Palace)
B3F; Platforms	Side platform, doors open on the right

== Operations ==
=== Train services ===
Futian is served by short-haul and long-distance high-speed trains on the Guangzhou-Shenzhen-Hong Kong Express Rail Link. Services connect the station with destinations including Hong Kong West Kowloon, Shenzhen North, Guangzhou South, Guangzhou East, Changsha South, Wuhan, Zhengzhou East, Beijing West and other mainland stations. The station was built primarily for high-frequency business traffic among Guangzhou, Shenzhen and Hong Kong, but long-distance trains have used it since 2016.

Some short-haul trains from Hong Kong West Kowloon terminate at Futian, while other Hong Kong West Kowloon services stop at Futian and continue north to Shenzhenbei and other mainland destinations. MTR timetable data effective from 1 July 2026 lists Hong Kong West Kowloon-Futian terminating trips with scheduled runtimes of 14 to 16 minutes; the same timetable lists many Futian-Shenzhenbei legs on through trains at about 10 to 12 minutes.

The 2026 third-quarter national timetable listed 216 EMU train movements a day at Futian and added 13 Hong Kong West Kowloon-Futian stopping services. It also changed the origin of the Shenzhen North-Jingdezhen North G2764 and Shenzhen North-Chengdu East G2942 services to Futian.

=== Exits and connections ===
Futian station is connected to the Shenzhen Metro station of the same name and to nearby underground pedestrian passages, including passages toward Civic Center and Link City. Together, the China Railway and metro portions of the interchange have more than 30 exits. China Railway exits along Yitian Road include exits 7, 10, 12A, 12B, 13 and 14.

Exit	Destination
Exit 7	Hong Kong China Travel Service Building, China Unicom Building, Times Financial Center
Exit 10	Kerry Plaza, Shangri-La Hotel
Exit 12A	Futian high-speed railway station bus terminus
Exit 12B	Futian high-speed railway station bus terminus
Exit 13	Futian high-speed railway station taxi stand
Exit 14	Southern Fund Building

== See also ==
- Shenzhen North station
- Hong Kong West Kowloon railway station
- Guangzhou–Shenzhen–Hong Kong Express Rail Link

Preceding station	China Railway High-speed	Following station
Terminus	Guangzhou–Shenzhen–Hong Kong XRL Short-haul service	Hong Kong West Kowloon Terminus
