= Convention and Exhibition Center station (Shenzhen Metro) =

Metro station in Shenzhen, Guangdong, China

Coordinates: 22°32′15″N 114°03′17″E

Convention & Exhibition Center 会展中心
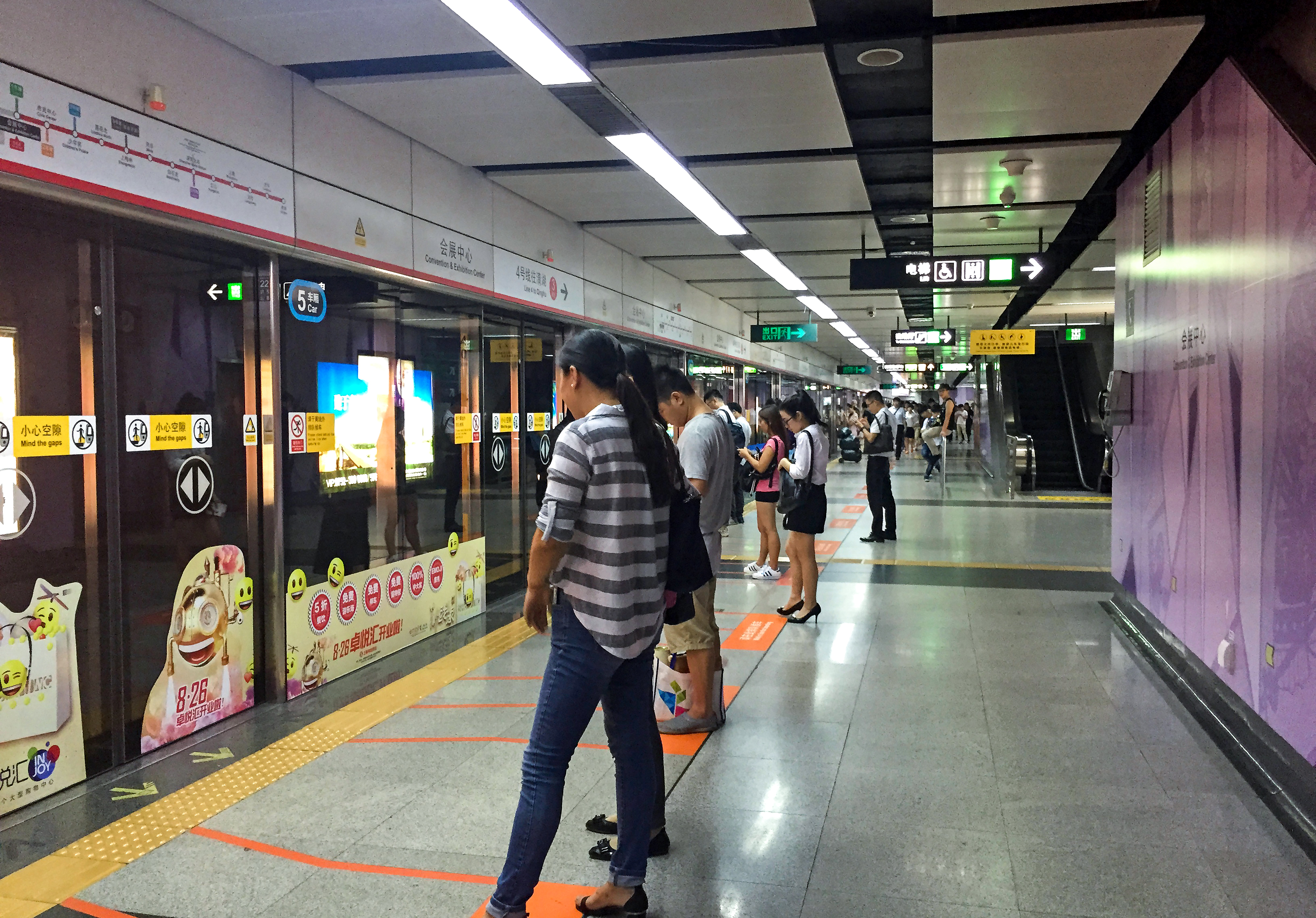

Chinese name
- Traditional Chinese: 會展中心
- Simplified Chinese: 会展中心
Transcriptions
Standard Mandarin
- Hanyu Pinyin: Huìzhǎn Zhōngxīn
Yue: Cantonese
- Jyutping: Wui6zin2 Zung1sam1

General information
- Other names: Huizhanzhongxin
- Location: Futian District, Shenzhen, Guangdong; China
- Operator: SZMC (Shenzhen Metro Group); MTR Corporation (Shenzhen)
- Lines: Line 1; Line 4
- Platforms: 4 (2 side platforms and 1 island platform)
- Tracks: 4

Construction
- Structure type: Underground
- Accessible: Yes

Other information
- Station code: 123 (Line 1); 421 (Line 4)

History
- Opened: 28 December 2004; 21 years ago (Lines 1 and 4)

Passengers
- 2015: 55,952 daily
- Rank: 10th of 118

Services
Preceding station	Shenzhen Metro	Following station
Shopping Park towards Airport East	Line 1	Gangxia towards Luohu
Civic Center towards Niuhu	Line 4	Fumin towards Futian Checkpoint
Track layout
Location

Convention & Exhibition Center station (simplified Chinese: 会展中心站; traditional Chinese: 會展中心站; pinyin: Huì-Zhǎn Zhōngxīn Zhàn; Jyutping: Wui6 Zin2 Zung1 Sam1 Zaam6); formerly Huizhanzhongxin station is an interchange station on Line 1 and Line 4 of the Shenzhen Metro. It opened on 28 December 2004. It is located under the junction of Fuhua Lu (福华路; 福華路) and Zhongxin Erlu (中心二路) in Futian District, Shenzhen, China. It gives access to Central Walk shopping mall (怡景中心城), Link City, Wongtee Plaza, the Sheraton Hotel, the Shangri-La Hotel, and Shenzhen Convention and Exhibition Center.

== Station layout ==
G	-	Exit
B1F; Concourse	Lobby	Customer service, shops, vending machines, ATMs, transfer passage between Line 1 and Line 4
B2F; Platforms	Platform 1	← Line 1 towards Airport East (Shopping Park)
B2F; Platforms	Island platform, doors will open on the left
B2F; Platforms	Platform 2	→ Line 1 towards Luohu (Gangxia) →
B3F; Platforms	Side platform, doors will open on the right
B3F; Platforms	Platform 4	← Line 4 towards Futian Checkpoint (Fumin)
B3F; Platforms	Platform 3	→ Line 4 towards Niuhu (Civic Center) →
B3F; Platforms	Side platform, doors will open on the right

== Exits ==
Exit	Destination
Exit A	Fuhua Road (N), Jintian Road, Shennan Boulevard, Great China International Trade Plaza, Sheraton Shenzhen Futian Hotel
Exit B	Central Walk Shopping Mall, Futian Shangri-La, Fuhua Road (N), Zhongxin 5th Road (W), Fuhua 1st Road, Zhongxin 4th Road, Shennan Boulevard, Link City, Sundan
Exit C	Convention & Exhibition Center, Fuhua Road (S), Zhongxin 4th Road
Exit D	Convention & Exhibition Center, The Ritz-Carlton Shenzhen, Fuhua Road (S), Zhongxin 5th Road (E), Fuhua 3rd Road (N) Exit D
Exit E	Fuhua Road (S), Zhongxin 5th Road (E), Jintian Road, Fuhua 3rd Road (N), Golden Central Tower (Hotel & Apartment), Convention & Exhibition Center, Excellence Intown, Wongtee Hotel
