= Civic Center station (Shenzhen Metro) =

Metro station in Shenzhen, Guangdong, China

Coordinates: 22°32′40″N 114°03′24″E

Civic Center 市民中心
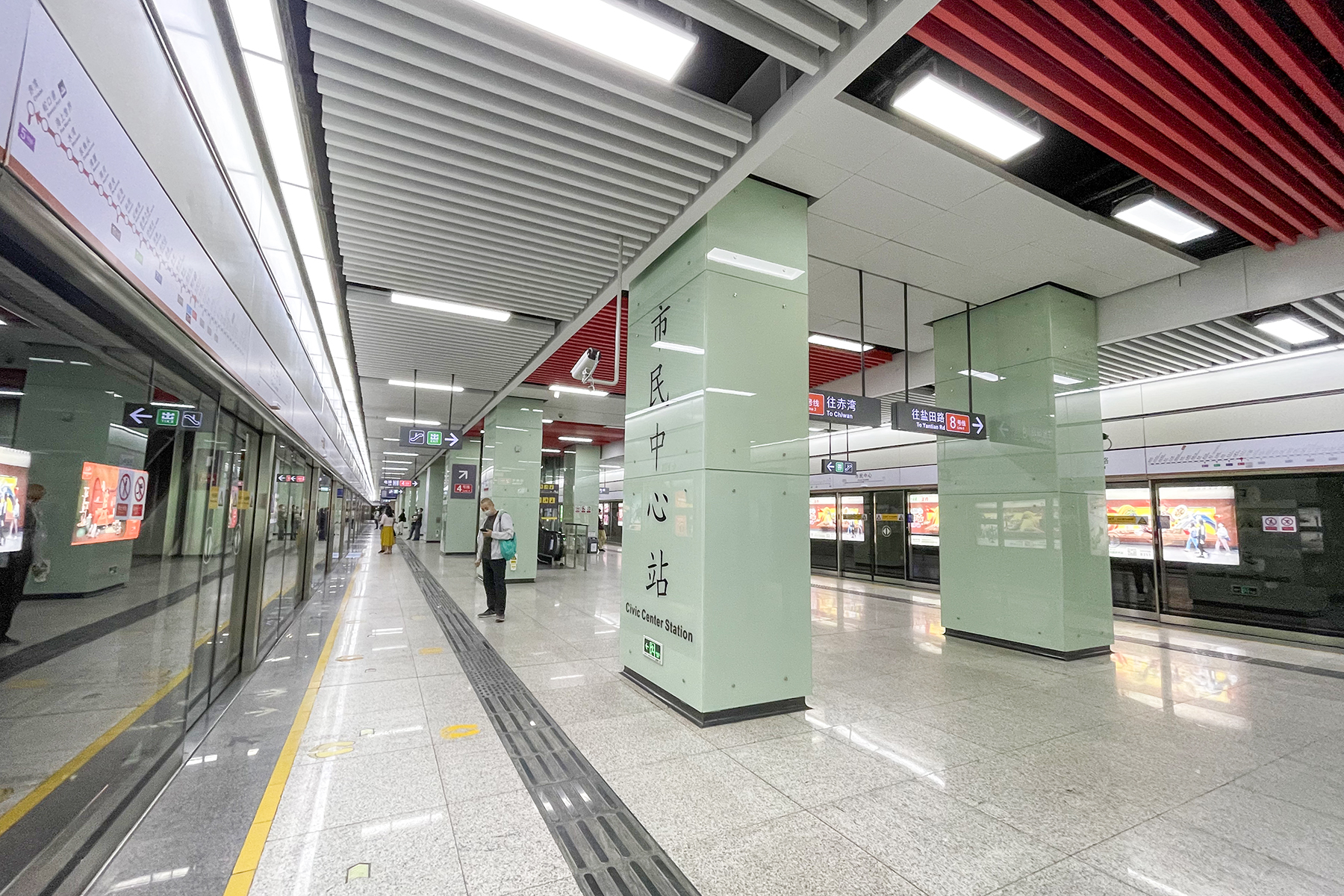
- Line 2 platform

Chinese name
- Chinese: 市民中心
Transcriptions
Standard Mandarin
- Hanyu Pinyin: Shìmín Zhōngxīn
Yue: Cantonese
- Jyutping: Si5man4 Zung1sam1

General information
- Other names: Shiminzhongxin
- Location: Futian District, Shenzhen, Guangdong; China
- Operated by: SZMC (Shenzhen Metro Group); MTR Corporation (Shenzhen)
- Lines: Line 2; Line 4
- Platforms: 4 (1 island platform and 2 side platforms)
- Tracks: 4

Construction
- Structure type: Underground
- Accessible: Yes

Other information
- Station code: 222 (line 2)

History
- Opened: Line 4: 28 June 2004 (21 years ago); Line 2: 29 June 2011 (14 years ago)
- Previous names: Shiminzhongxin

Services
Preceding station	Shenzhen Metro	Following station
Futian towards Chiwan	Line 2	Gangxia North towards Liantang (Line 8: Xichong)
Children's Palace towards Niuhu	Line 4	Convention and Exhibition Center towards Futian Checkpoint
Route map
Location

Civic Center station (Chinese: 市民中心站; pinyin: shìmín zhōngxīn zhàn) is a station on Line 2 and Line 4 of the Shenzhen Metro. Line 4 platforms opened on 28 December 2004 and Line 2 platforms opened on 28 June 2011. It is located under the junction of Fuzhong 3rd Road (Chinese: 福中三路) and Shennan Boulevard (Chinese: 深南大道) in Futian District, Shenzhen, China. It is adjacent to Shenzhen Civic Center (Chinese: 市民中心).

== Station layout ==
Civic Center has four levels. Basement 1 is an underground food court called "三寸时光地铁美食驿站". Basement 2 are separated concourses for lines 2 and 4. Basement 3 is the platform of line 4, which consists of two side platforms with two tracks. Basement 4 is an island platform for line 2 with two tracks.

G	Ground level	Exits
B1	Property Development	Convenience Store, Subway
B2	Concourse	Customer service, Self-service
B3	Side platform, doors will open on the right
B3	Platform 1	← 4 towards Niuhu (Children's Palace)
B3	Platform 2	4 towards Futian Checkpoint (Convention and Exhibition Center) →
B3	Side platform, doors will open on the right
B4		← 2 towards Chiwan (Futian)
B4	Island platform, doors will open on the left
B4		8 towards Xichong (Gangxia North) →

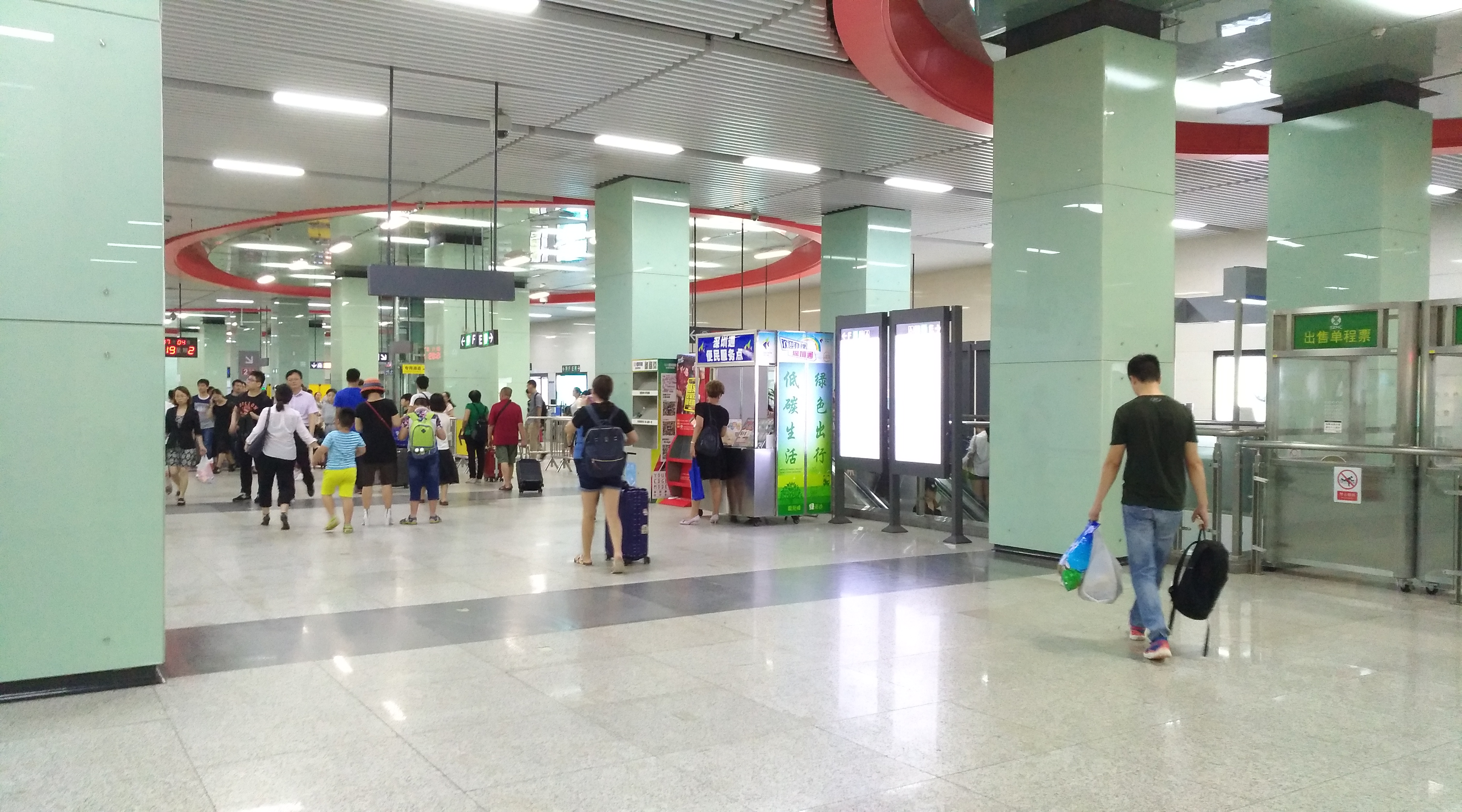
Line 2 concourse

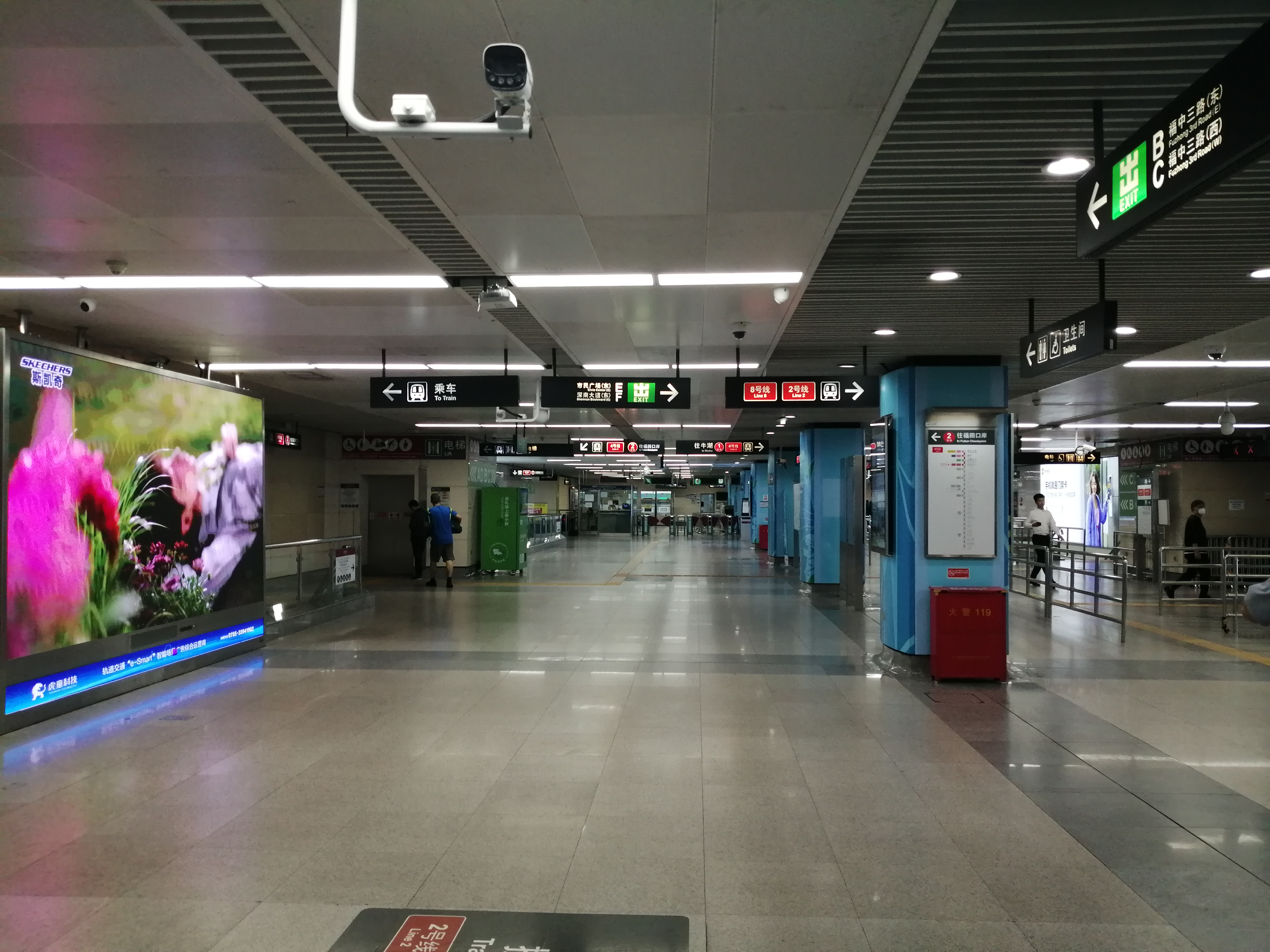
Line 4 concourse

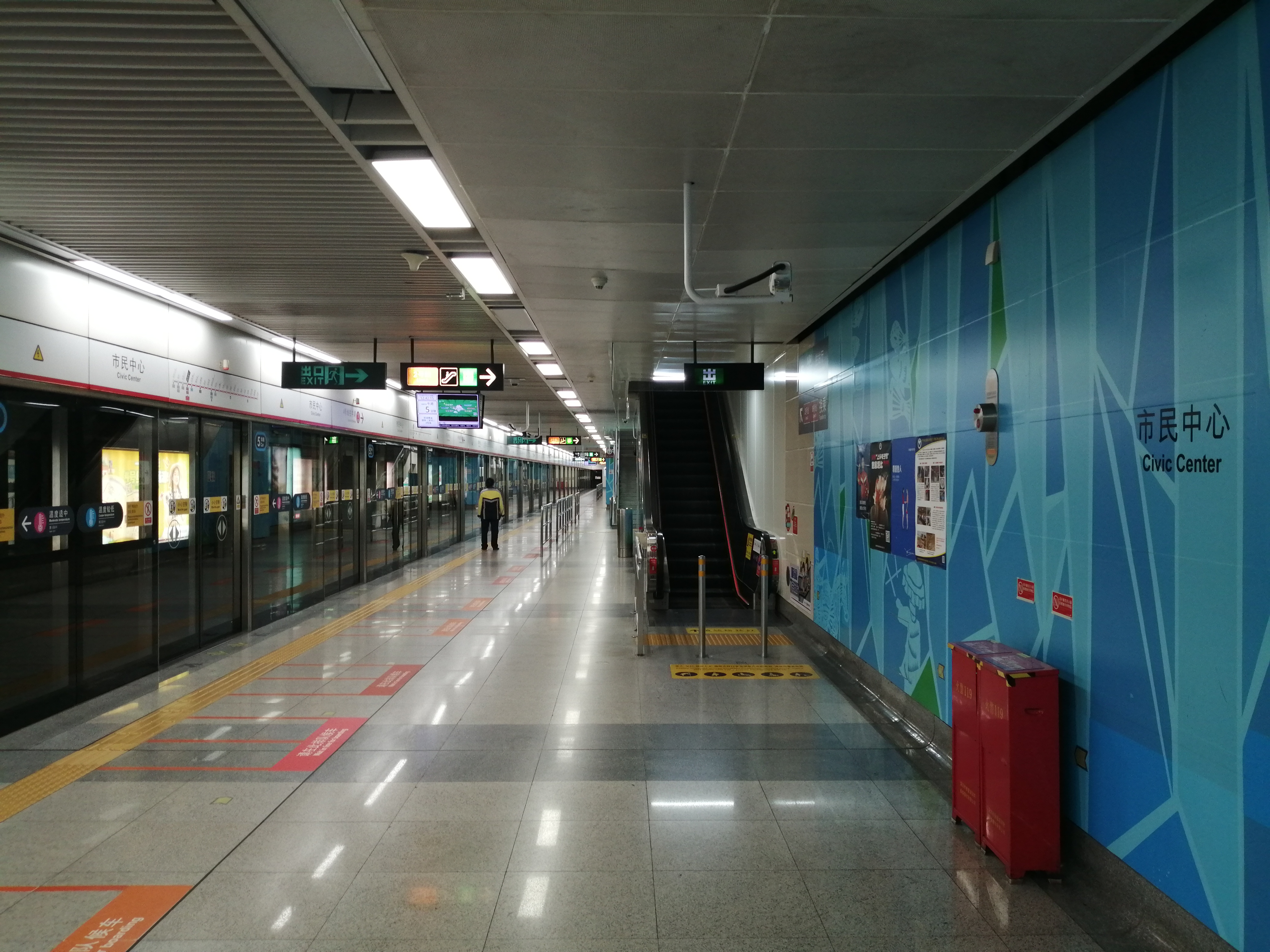
Platform for Line 4 towards Niuhu

== Exits ==
Exit	Destination
Exit A	Jintian Road, Fuhua Road (N), Shennan Boulevard, The Executive Office of the Organizing Committee for the 26th Summer Universiade, Great China International Trade Plaza, Sheraton Shenzhen Futian Hotel, China Phoenix Building
Exit B	Fuzhong 3rd Road (E), Fuhua Road (N), Zhongxin 5th Road (W), Fuhua 1st Road, Zhongxin 4th Road, Shennan Boulevard, Central Walk Shopping Mall, Futian Shangri-la Hotel, Shenzhen Museum, Civic Center (E), Anlian Plaza, China Phoenix Building, Noble Center, Rongchao Landmark, Yasongjü
Exit C	Fuzhong 3rd Road (W), Yitian Road, Fuhua Road (S), Zhongxin 4th Road, Convention & Exhibition Center, Civic Center (W), Civic Square (N)
Exit D	Shennan Boulevard, Fuhua Road (S), Zhongxin 5th Road (E), Fuhua 3rd Road (N), Convention & Exhibition Center, Ritz-Carlton Hotel Shenzhen, Civic Square (S)
Exit E	Shennan Boulevard, Civic Square, Fuhua Road (S), Zhongxin 5th Road (E), Fuhua 3rd Road (N), Jintian Road, Golden Central Hotel, Convention & Exhibition Center
Exit F	Fugang Cinema, Shennan Boulevard, Jintian Road, Anlian Plaza, China Phoenix Building
