= Lianhuacun station =

Metro station in Shenzhen, Guangdong, China

Lianhuacun 莲花村
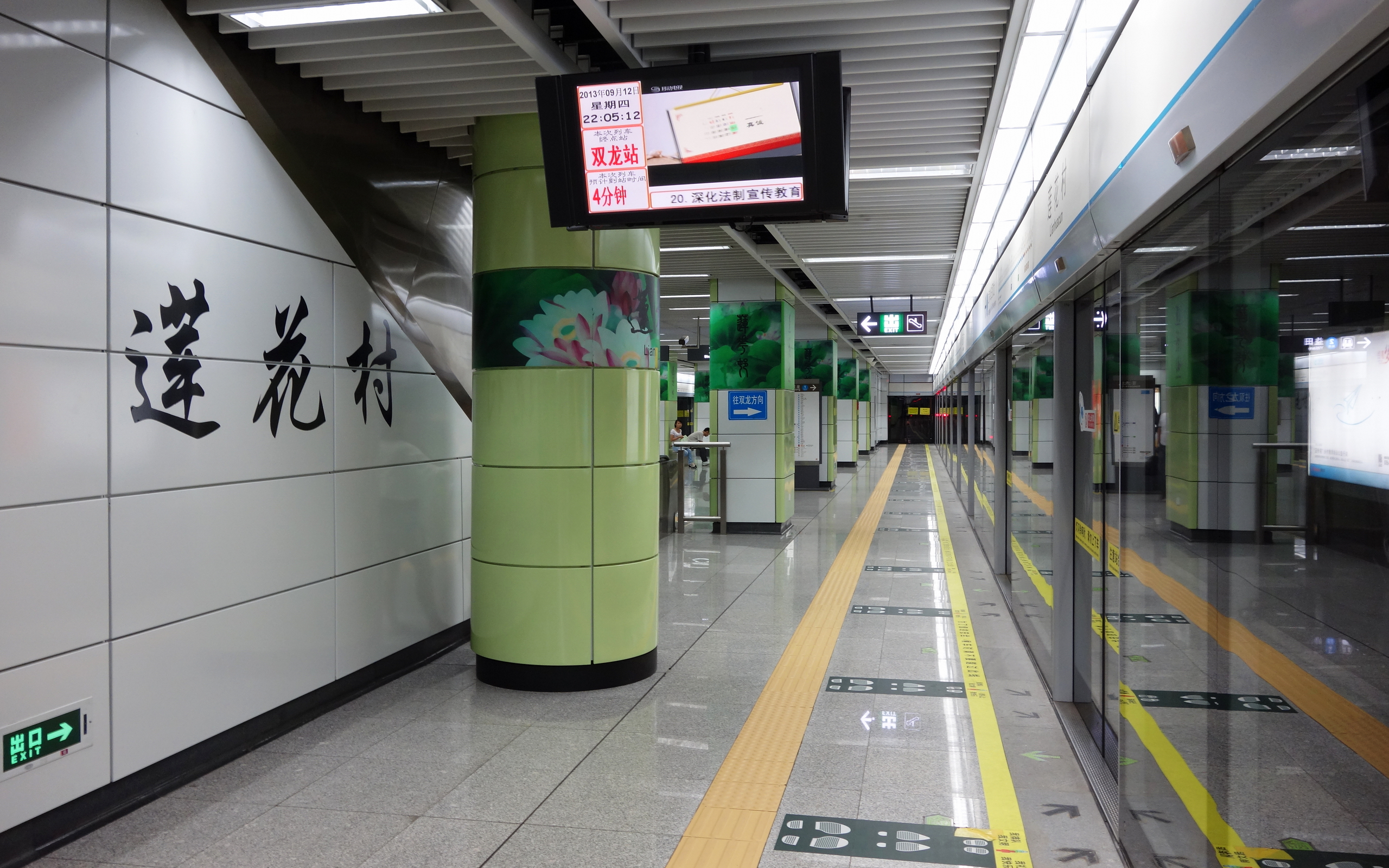
- Line 3 platform

Chinese name
- Traditional Chinese: 蓮花村
- Simplified Chinese: 莲花村
- Literal meaning: Lotus Village
Transcriptions
Standard Mandarin
- Hanyu Pinyin: Líanhuā Cūn
Yue: Cantonese
- Jyutping: Lin4faa1 Cyun1

General information
- Location: Futian District, Shenzhen, Guangdong; China
- Coordinates: 22°32′55″N 114°4′4″E
- Operated by: SZMC (Shenzhen Metro Group)
- Lines: Line 3; Line 10
- Platforms: 4 (1 island platform and 2 side platforms)
- Tracks: 4

Construction
- Structure type: Underground
- Accessible: Yes

History
- Opened: Line 3: 28 June 2011 (14 years ago); Line 10: 18 August 2020 (5 years ago)

Services
Preceding station	Shenzhen Metro	Following station
Huaxin towards Pingdi Liulian	Line 3	Children's Palace towards Futian Bonded Area
Donggualing towards Shuangyong Street	Line 10	Gangxia North towards Futian Checkpoint
Route map
Location

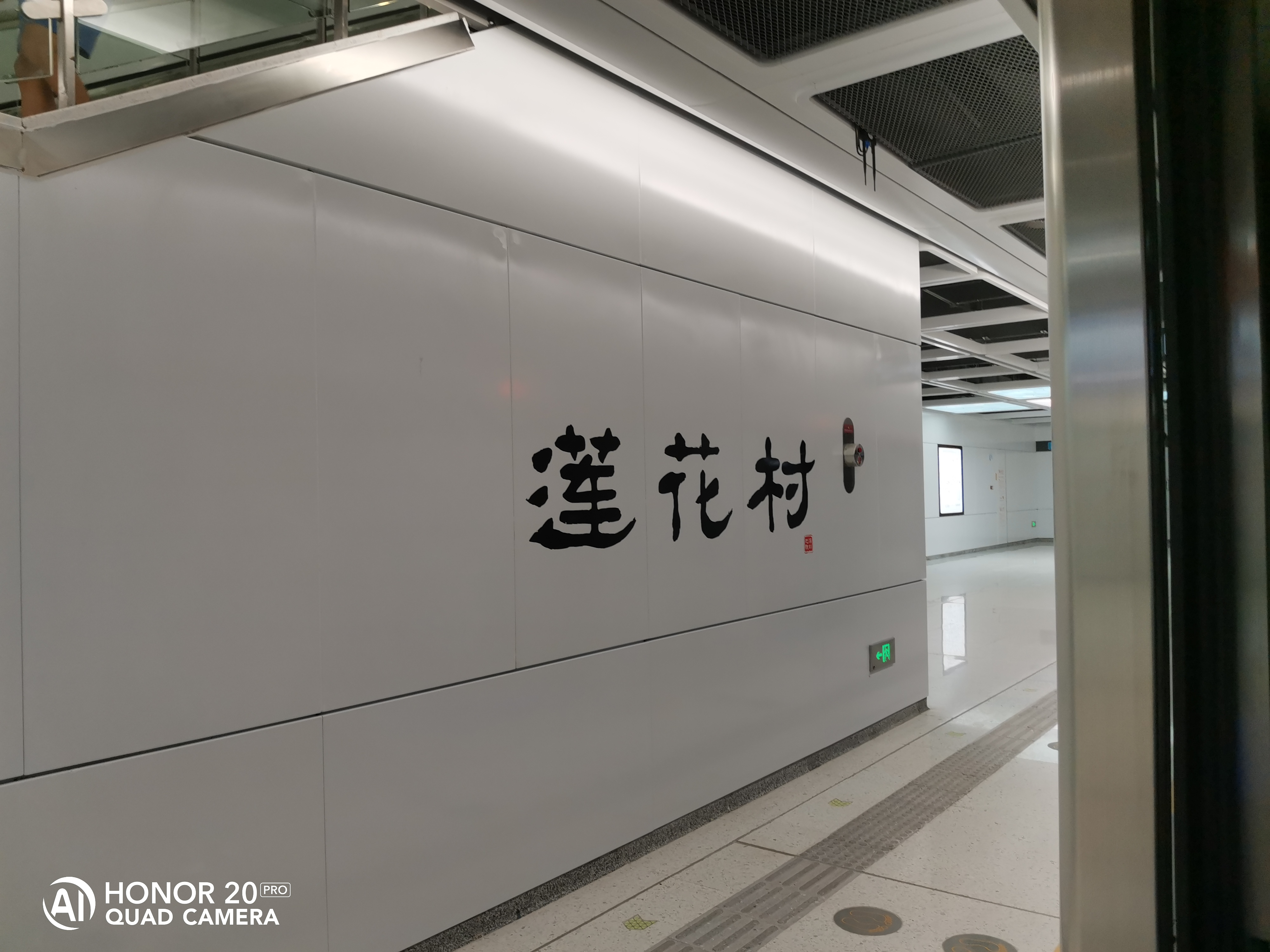
Line 10 northbound platform

Lianhuacun station (Chinese: 莲花村站; pinyin: Líanhuācūn Zhàn; Jyutping: lin4 faa1 cyun1 zaam6; lit. 'Lotus Village station') is a station of Line 3 and Line 10 of the Shenzhen Metro. Line 3 platforms opened on 28 June 2011 and Line 10 platforms opened on 18 August 2020.

== Station layout ==
G	-	Exits A-E
B1F; Concourse	Lobby	Ticket Machines, Customer Service, Shops, Vending Machines
B2F; 3 Platforms	Platform	3 towards Futian Bonded Area (Children's Palace)
B2F; 3 Platforms	Island platform, doors will open on the left
B2F; 3 Platforms	Platform	3 towards Pingdi Liulian (Huaxin)
B3F; 10 Platforms	Side platform, doors will open on the right
B3F; 10 Platforms	Platform	10 towards Futian Checkpoint (Gangxia North)
B3F; 10 Platforms	Platform	10 towards Shuangyong Street (Donggualing)
B3F; 10 Platforms	Side platform, doors will open on the right

== Exits ==
Exits		Picture	Destination
Exit A	A1		Hongli West Road (S), Caitian Road (S), Haitian Road (E), Shenzhen Tianjian Primary School, Metro Building, Tianjian Century Garden, Shenye Garden, Securities Times, CHINAFUND
Exit A	A2		West Side of Caitian Rd (S), South Side of Hongli Rd (W), Zhongyin Garden, BoC Tower, Shenzhen Metro Building, Tianjian Century Garden, Shenye Garden, Shenzhen Tianjian Primary School
Exit B	B1		Caitian Road (S), Lianhua Primary School
Exit B	B2		Hongli West Road (S), Hongli Road (E), Fulian Garden, Zhenye Garden, Changfu Garden, Xiandai Court
Exit C	C1		Hongli West Road (N), Huanggang Road (N), Caitian Road (N), Shenzhen Lianhua Middle School, Lianhua Building, Lianhua Village, Lianhua Ercun
Exit C	C2		East Side of Caitian Rd (N), North Side of Hongli Rd (E), Lianhua Ercun, Lianhua Building, Shenzhen Lianhua Ercun Kindergarten, Lianhua Middle School (North Campus), Meilian Garden, Meilian Primary School
Exit D			Hongli West Road (N), Caitian Road (N), Guanshanyue Art Museum, Lianhuashan Park
Exit E			West Side of Caitian Rd (N), North Side of Hongli Rd (W), Lianhuashan Park
