= Maling station =

Metro station in Shenzhen, Guangdong, China

Coordinates: 22°34′27″N 114°4′30″E

Maling 孖岭
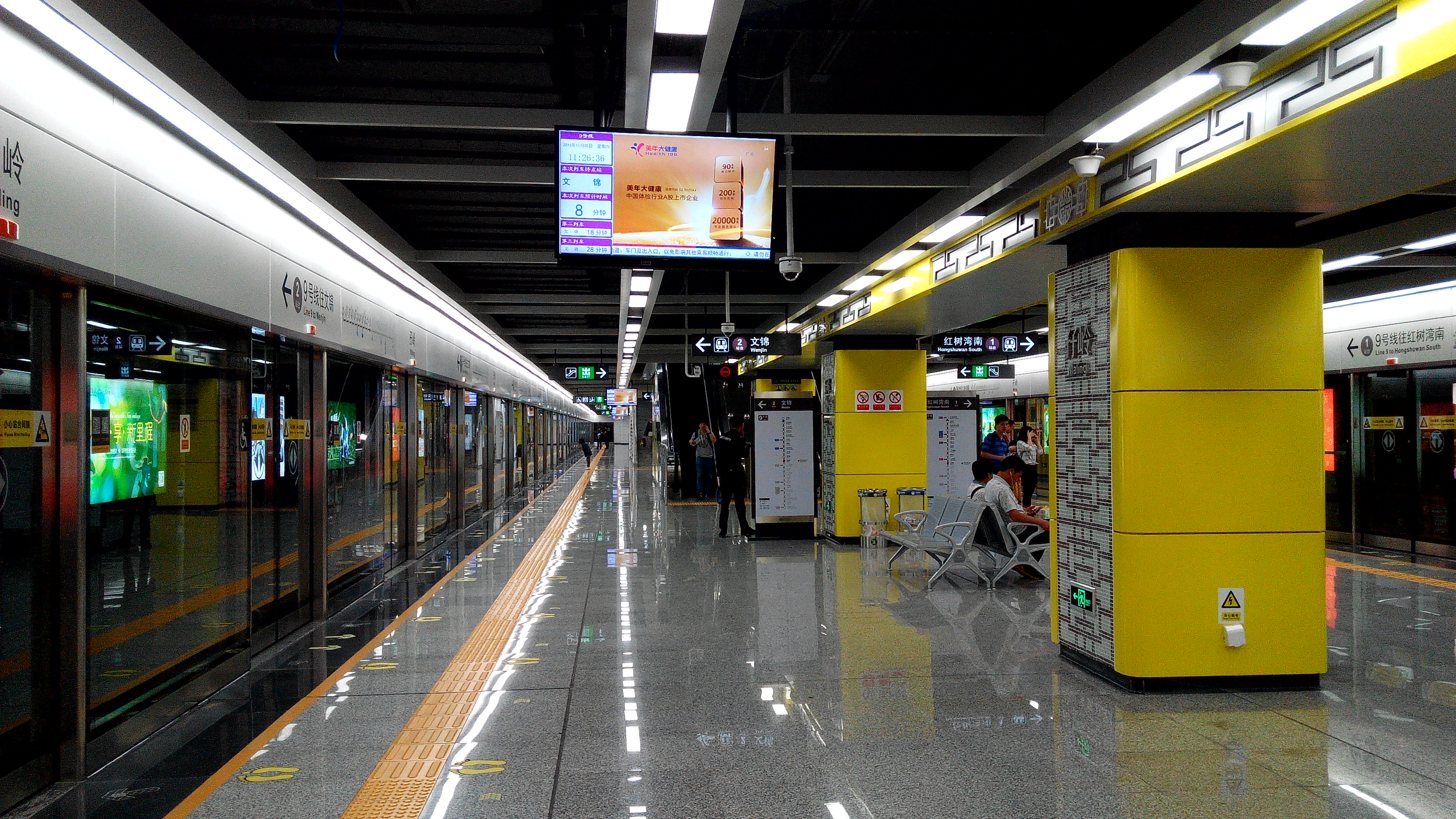

General information
- Location: Futian District, Shenzhen, Guangdong; China
- Operator: SZMC (Shenzhen Metro Group)
- Lines: Line 9; Line 10
- Platforms: 4 (2 island platforms)
- Tracks: 4

Construction
- Structure type: Underground
- Accessible: Yes

History
- Opened: 28 October 2016; 9 years ago (Line 9); 18 August 2020; 6 years ago (Line 10)

Services
Preceding station	Shenzhen Metro	Following station
Yinhu towards Wenjin	Line 9	Shangmeilin towards Qianwan
Yabao towards Shuangyong Street	Line 10	Donggualing towards Futian Checkpoint
Location

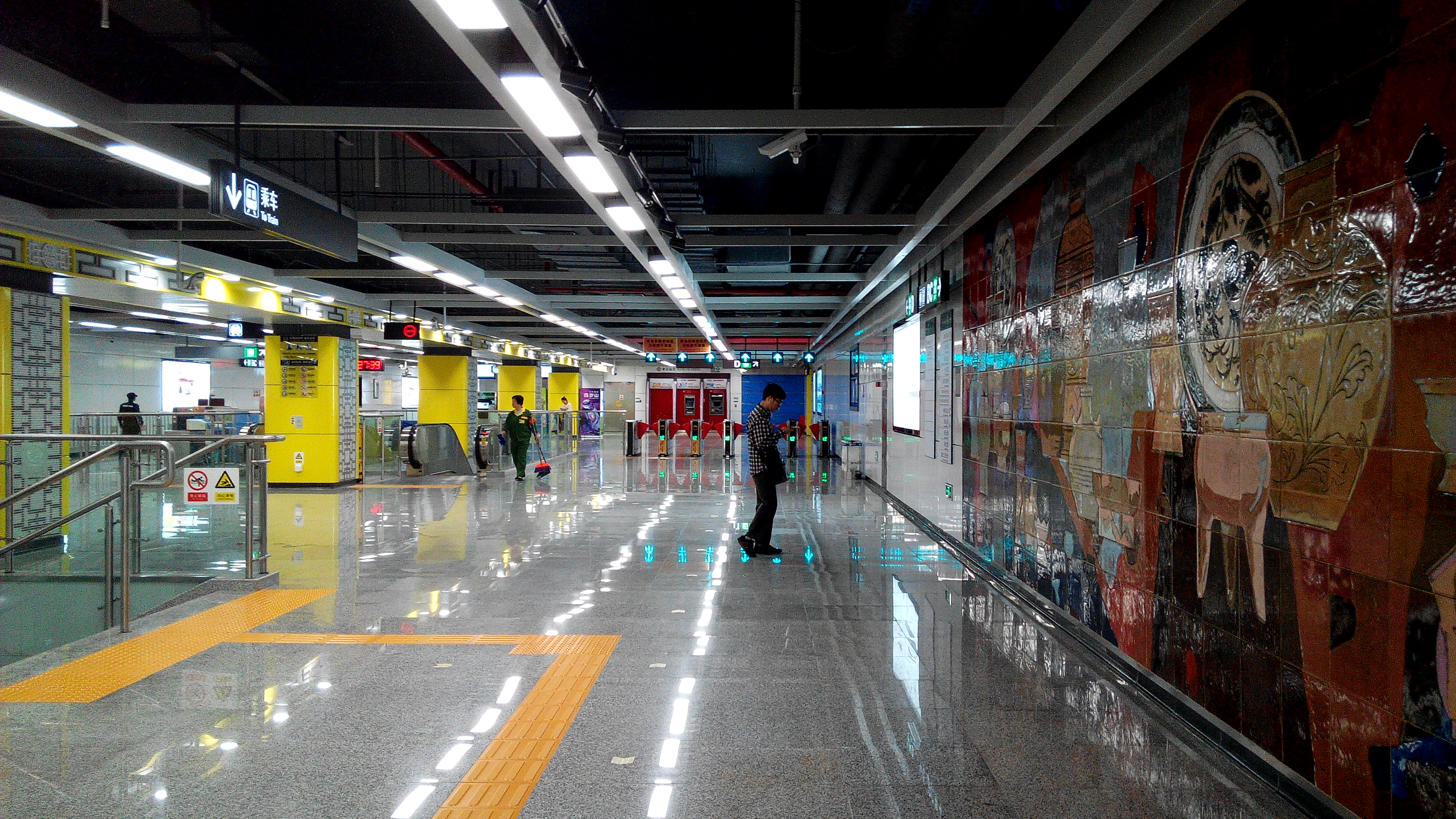
Concourse

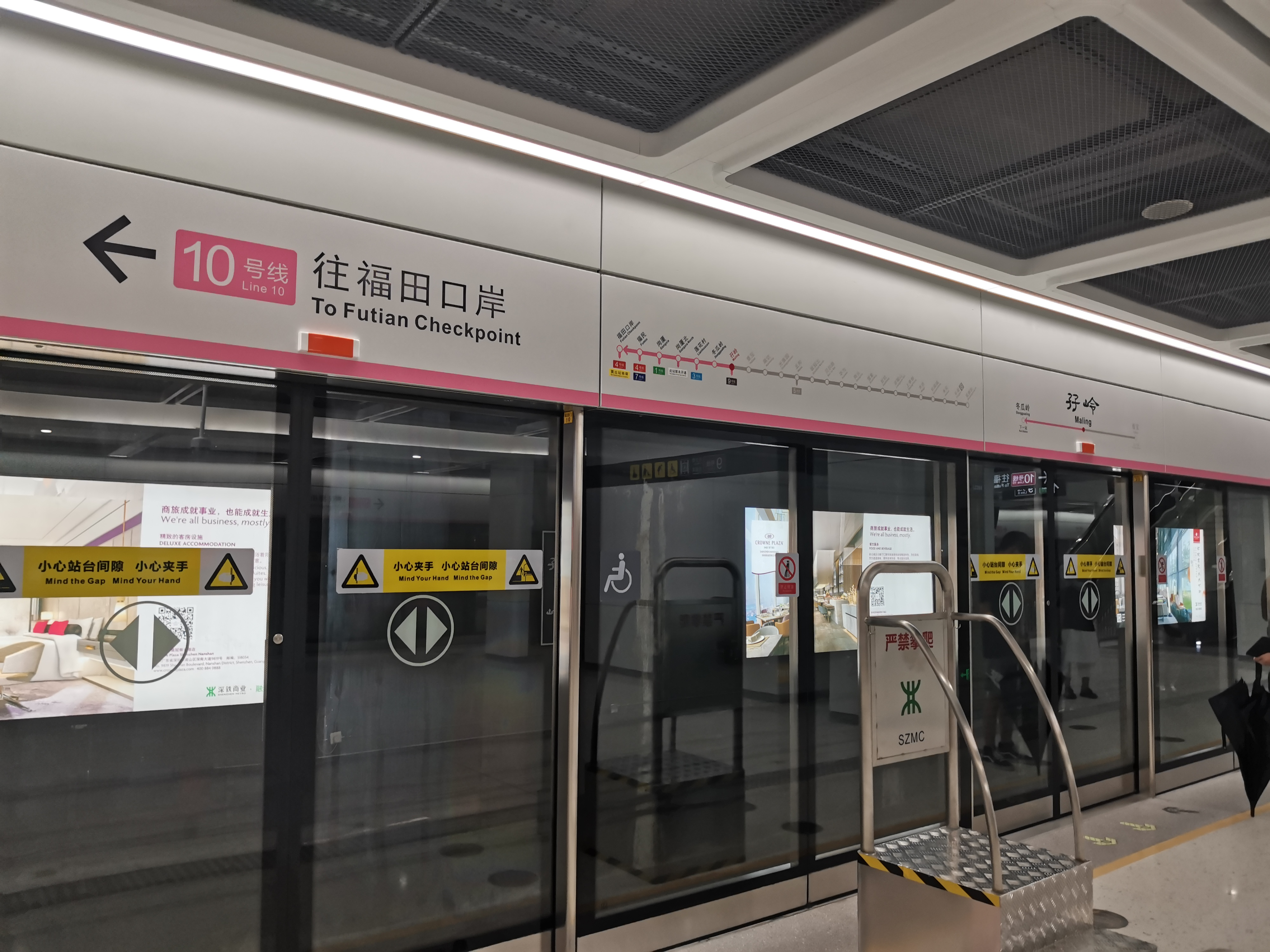
Line 10 southbound platform

Maling station (simplified Chinese: 孖岭站; traditional Chinese: 孖嶺站; pinyin: Mālǐng Zhàn; Jyutping: maa1 ling5 zaam6) is a station of Line 9 and Line 10 of the Shenzhen Metro. Line 9 platforms opened on 28 October 2016 and Line 10 platforms opened on 18 August 2020.

== Station layout ==
G	-	Exit
B1F; Concourse	Lobby	Customer Service, Shops, Vending machines, ATMs
B2F; Platforms	Platform 1	← Line 9 towards Qianwan (Shangmeilin)
B2F; Platforms	Island platform, doors will open on the left
B2F; Platforms	Platform 2	→ Line 9 towards Wenjin (Yinhu) →
B3F; Platforms	Platform	← Line 10 towards Futian Checkpoint (Donggualing)
B3F; Platforms	Island platform, doors will open on the left
B3F; Platforms	Platform	→ Line 10 towards Shuangyong Street (Yabao) →

== Exits ==
Exit		Destination
Exit A	A1	Reserved
Exit A	A2	Shenzhen Revolutionary Martyrs Cemetery, Sunhope e·Metro, Caitian Road
Exit B		South Side of Meilin Road, Shenzhen Cemetery of Revolutionary Martyrs, Shenzhen Youth League School, Youth Academy, Futian Brand of Pary School of Shenzhen Municipal, Shenzhen Open University (Futian Compus), Shenzhen Second Senior Technical School, Jinfeng Garden, Shenzhen Mosque
Exit C		North Side of Meilin Road, Meidong 5th Road, Jidian Building, Pengyun Building, Futian Bus Police Office, Shenzhen Comprehensive Service Center for Disabled, Shenzhen Social Welfare Center Rehabilitation Hospital
Exit D		East Side of Caitian Road, North Side of Meilin Road
Exit E		Sida Building, South Side of Meiilin Rd (W)
Exit F		Zhuohong Building, West Side of Caitian Rd (S)
