= Fumin station =

Metro station in Shenzhen, Guangdong, China

Fumin 福民
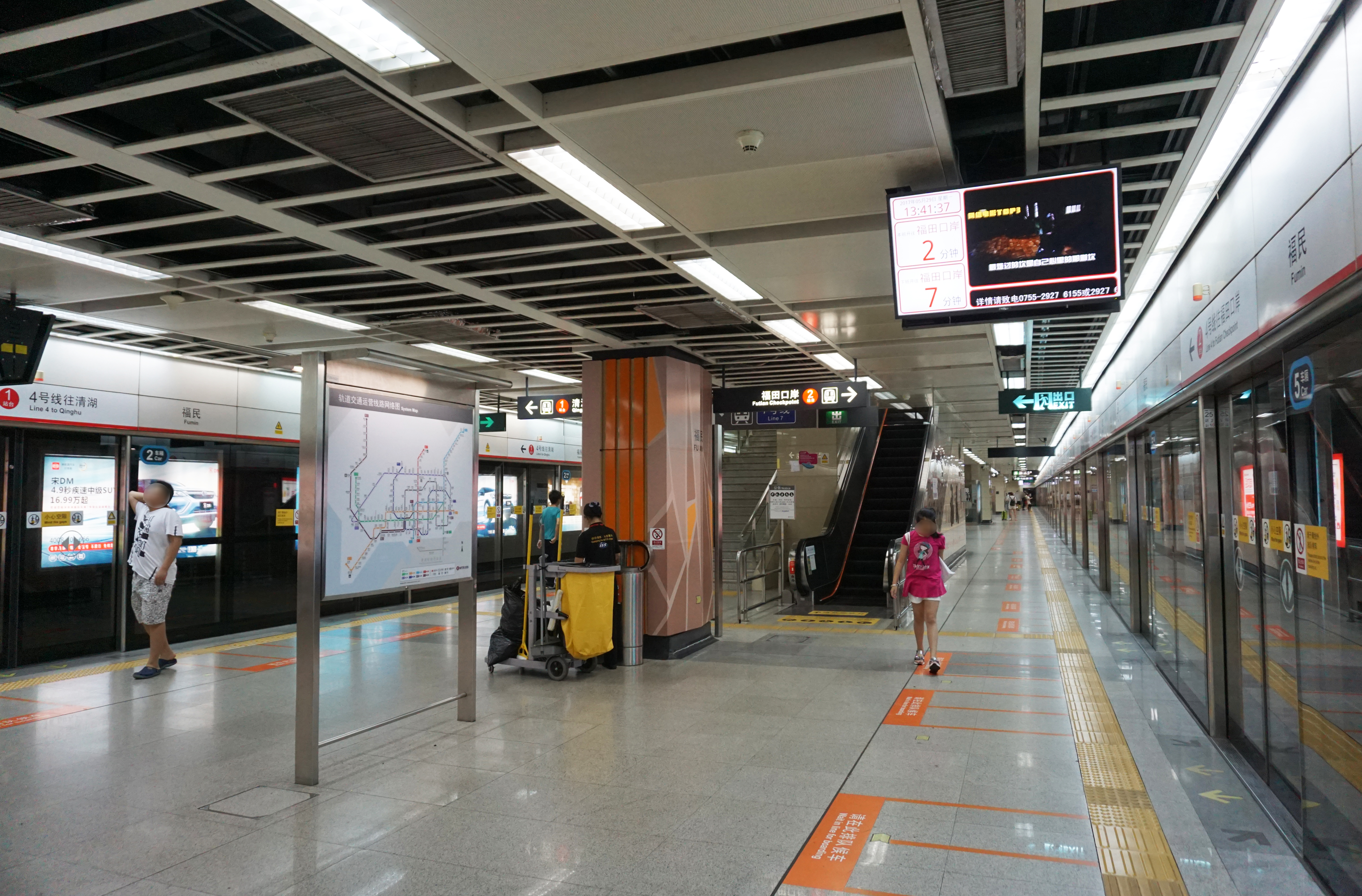
- Line 4 platform

General information
- Location: Futian District, Shenzhen, Guangdong; China
- Coordinates: 22.5258°N 114.06°E
- Operated by: MTR Corporation (Shenzhen); SZMC (Shenzhen Metro Group)
- Lines: Line 4; Line 7; Line 10
- Platforms: 6 (3 island platforms)
- Tracks: 6

Construction
- Structure type: Underground
- Accessible: Yes

History
- Opened: Line 4: 28 December 2004 (21 years ago); Line 7: 28 October 2016 (9 years ago); Line 10: 18 August 2020 (5 years ago)

Services
Preceding station	Shenzhen Metro	Following station
Convention and Exhibition Center towards Niuhu	Line 4	Futian Checkpoint Terminus
Huanggangcun towards SZU Lihu Campus	Line 7	Huanggang Checkpoint towards Tai'an
Gangxia towards Shuangyong Street	Line 10	Futian Checkpoint Terminus
Location

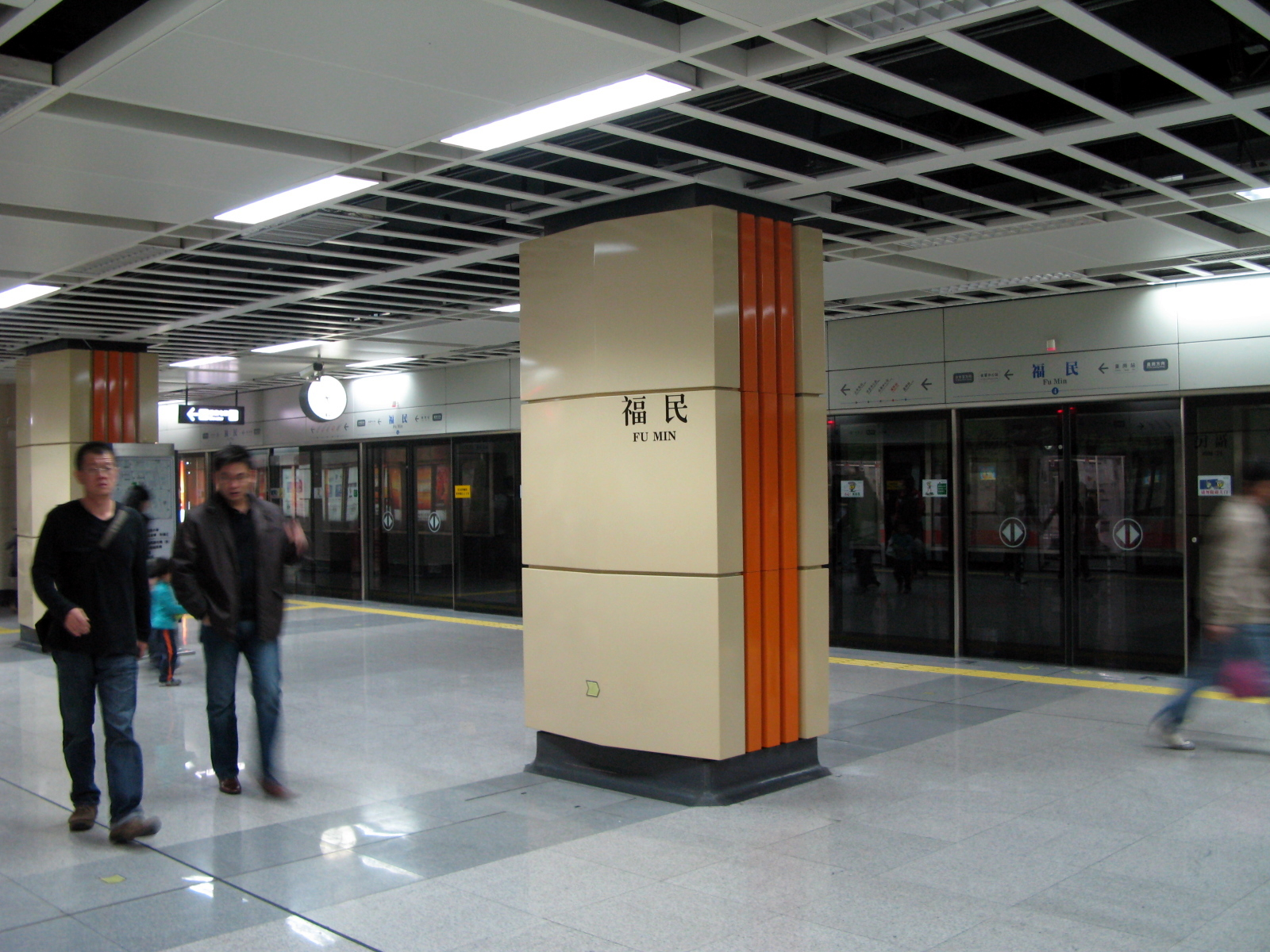
Fumin station in 2008

Fumin station (Chinese: 福民站; pinyin: Fúmín Zhàn) is a station of Line 4, Line 7 and Line 10 of the Shenzhen Metro. Line 4 platforms opened on 28 December 2004, Line 7 platforms opened on 28 October 2016 and Line 10 platforms opened on 18 August 2020. It is located under the junction of Jintian Lu (Chinese: 金田路) and Fumin Lu (Chinese: 福民路) in Futian District, Shenzhen, China. The station served as the southern terminus of Line 4 until 15 August 2007.

== Station layout ==
G	-	Exits A-K
B1F; Concourse	Lobby	Ticket machines, customer service, shops, vending machines Transfer passage between Line 4, Line 7 and Line 10
B2F; 4 & 10 Platforms	Platform 2	4 towards Futian Checkpoint (terminus)
B2F; 4 & 10 Platforms	Island platform, doors will open on the left
B2F; 4 & 10 Platforms	Platform 1	4 towards Niuhu (Convention and Exhibition Center)
B2F; 4 & 10 Platforms	Wall
B2F; 4 & 10 Platforms	Platform	10 towards Futian Checkpoint (terminus)
B2F; 4 & 10 Platforms	Island platform, doors will open on the left
B2F; 4 & 10 Platforms	Platform	10 towards Shuangyong Street (Gangxia)
B3F; 7 Platforms	Platform	7 towards SZU Lihu Campus (Huanggangcun)
B3F; 7 Platforms	Island platform, doors will open on the left
B3F; 7 Platforms	Platform	7 towards Tai'an (Huanggang Checkpoint)

== Exits ==
Exit		Destination
Exit A		South Side of Fumin Road, East Side of Jintian Road (S), Fumin Jiayuan
Exit B		North Side of Fumin Road
Exit C		North Side of Fumin Road (W), Huang'an Building, Jinyi Huating, Huanggangcun
Exit D		North Ziguang Mingyuan, South Side of Fumin Road, West Side of Jintian Road (S), Futian Maternity & Child Care Hospital, Yinzhuang Building, Shuiwei Culture Square, Shenzhen Futian Shuiwei Primary School
Exit E		South Side of Fumin Road, Shidai Xingju, Lüyinge Garden, Fuya Yuan
Exit F		North Side of Fumin Road, West Side of Longqiu 1st Street, Futian Maternity & Child, Healthcare Hospital, Zhiben Building, Xinshengyuan, Ziguang Mingyuan, Huanggang Middle School, Huangfu Yuyuan
Exit G		North Side of Fumin Road, Zhiben Building, East Side of Jintian Road (N)
Exit H		East Side of Fuqiang Road (S), Fumin Building, Fumin New Village
Exit I		Reserved
Exit J	J1	East Side of Fuqiang Road (N), Shenzhen Second Senior Technical School
Exit J	J2	West Side of Fuqiang Road (N), Jilong 3Road Street, Hengfu Garden
Exit J	J3	Fuange
Exit K		West Side of Fuqiang Road (S), Huangtingju, Ziguang Mingyuan, Jingyuan Huating
