= Children's Palace station =

Metro station in Shenzhen, Guangdong, China

Children's Palace 少年宫
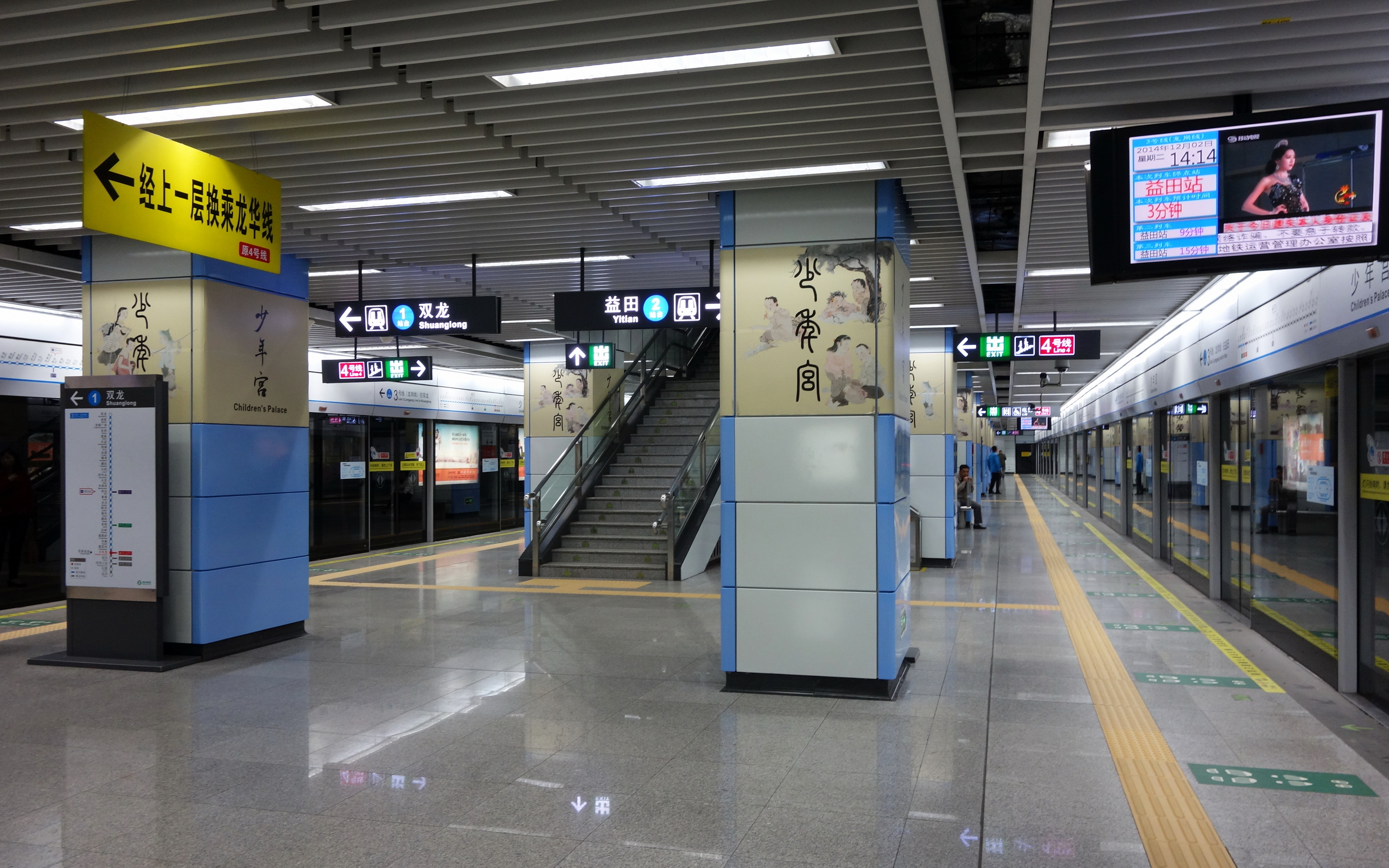
- Line 3 platform

General information
- Other names: Shaoniangong
- Location: Futian District, Shenzhen, Guangdong; China
- Coordinates: 22°33′01″N 114°03′18″E
- Operator: Shenzhen Metro Line 3 Operations; MTR Corporation (Shenzhen)
- Lines: Line 3; Line 4
- Platforms: 4 (1 island platform and 2 side platforms)
- Tracks: 4

Construction
- Structure type: Underground
- Accessible: Yes

Other information
- Station code: CHP

History
- Opened: Line 4: 28 December 2004 (21 years ago); Line 3: 28 June 2011 (15 years ago)
- Former names: Shaoniangong

Services
| Preceding station | Shenzhen Metro | Following station |
|---|---|---|
| Lianhuacun towards Pingdi Liulian | Line 3 | Futian towards Futian Bonded Area |
| Lianhua North towards Niuhu | Line 4 | Civic Center towards Futian Checkpoint |
Location

Children's Palace station
- Chinese: 少年宫
Transcriptions
Standard Mandarin
- Hanyu Pinyin: Shàonián Gōng
Yue: Cantonese
- Jyutping: siu3 nin4 gung1

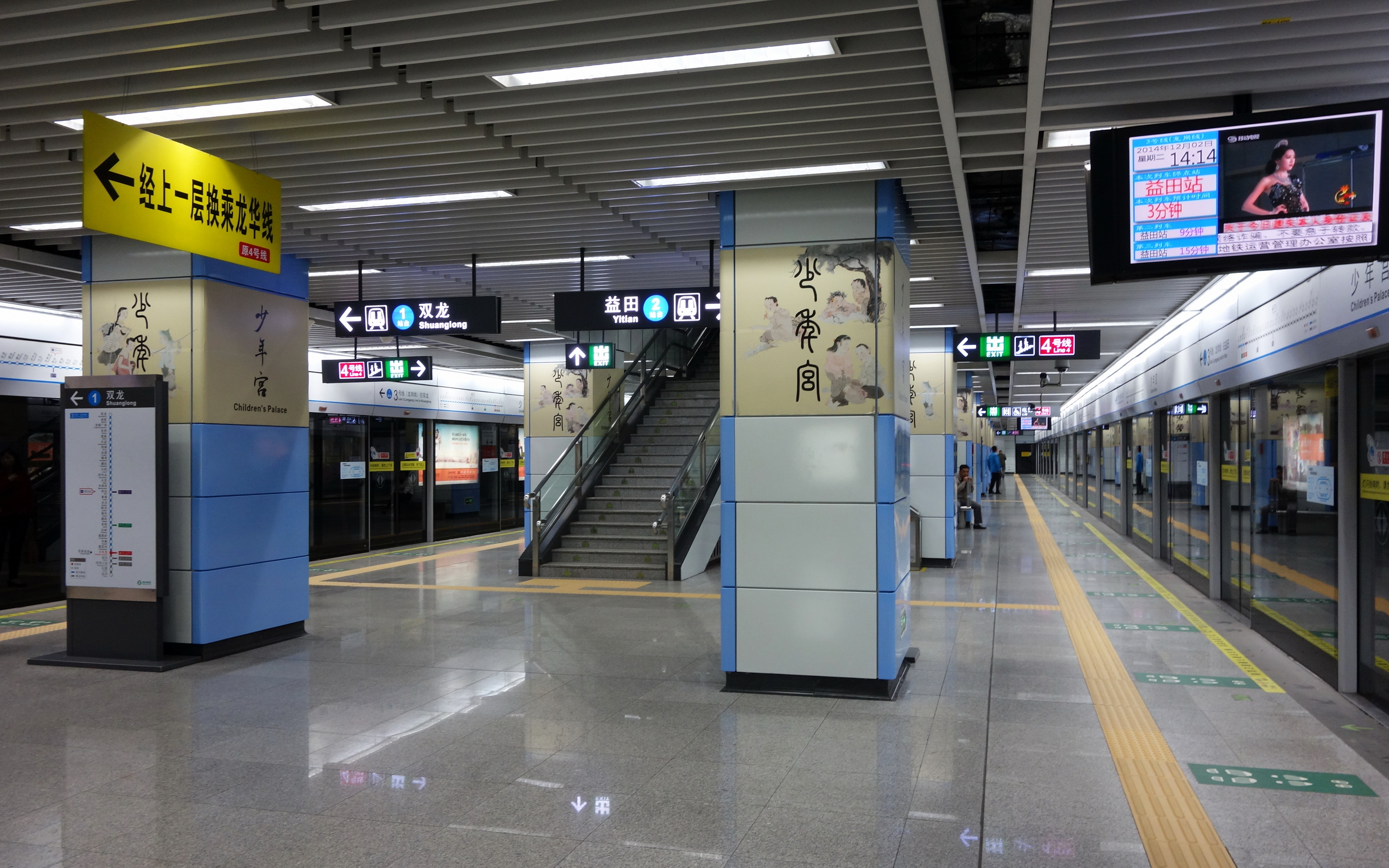
Line 3 platform

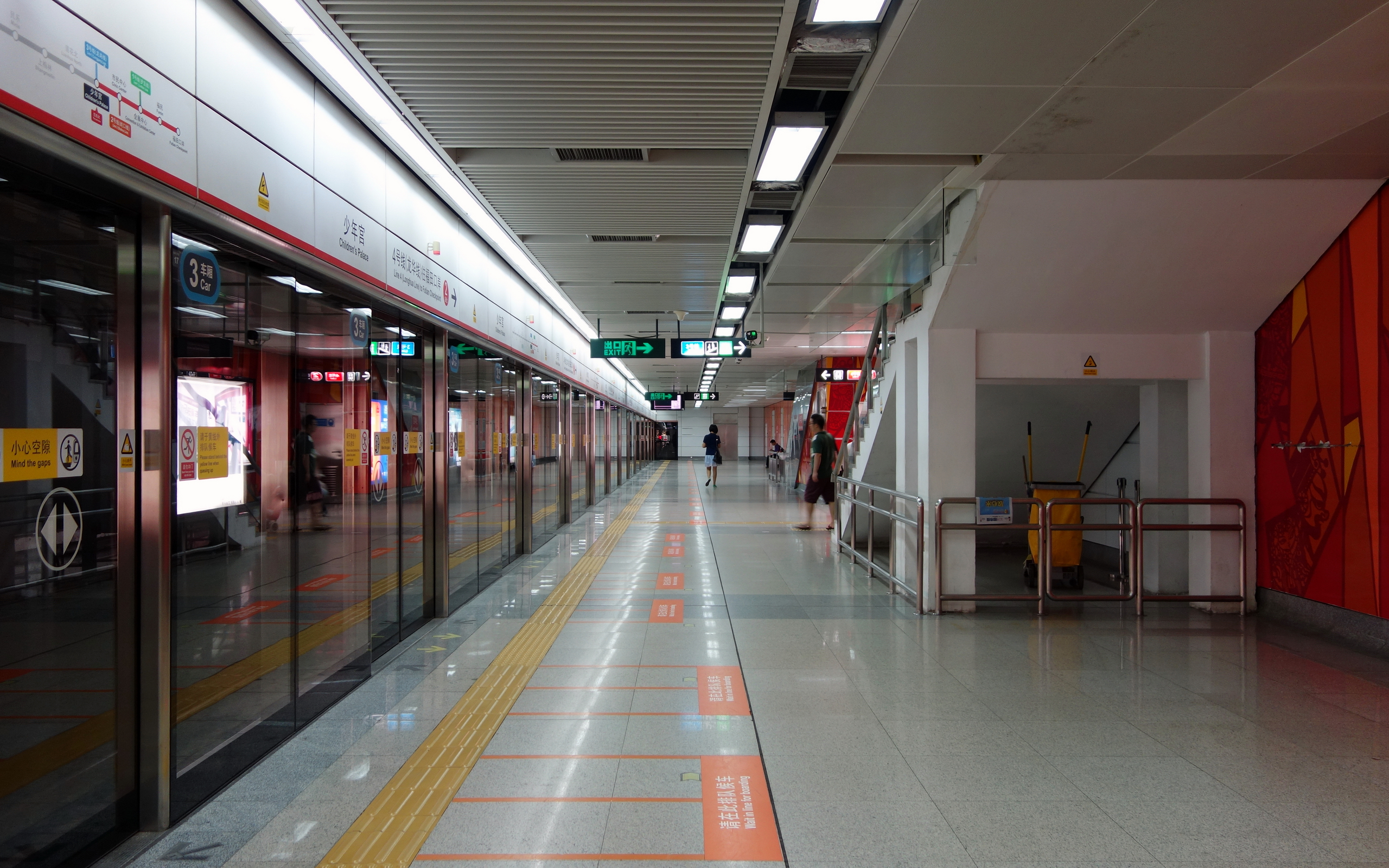
Line 4 platform

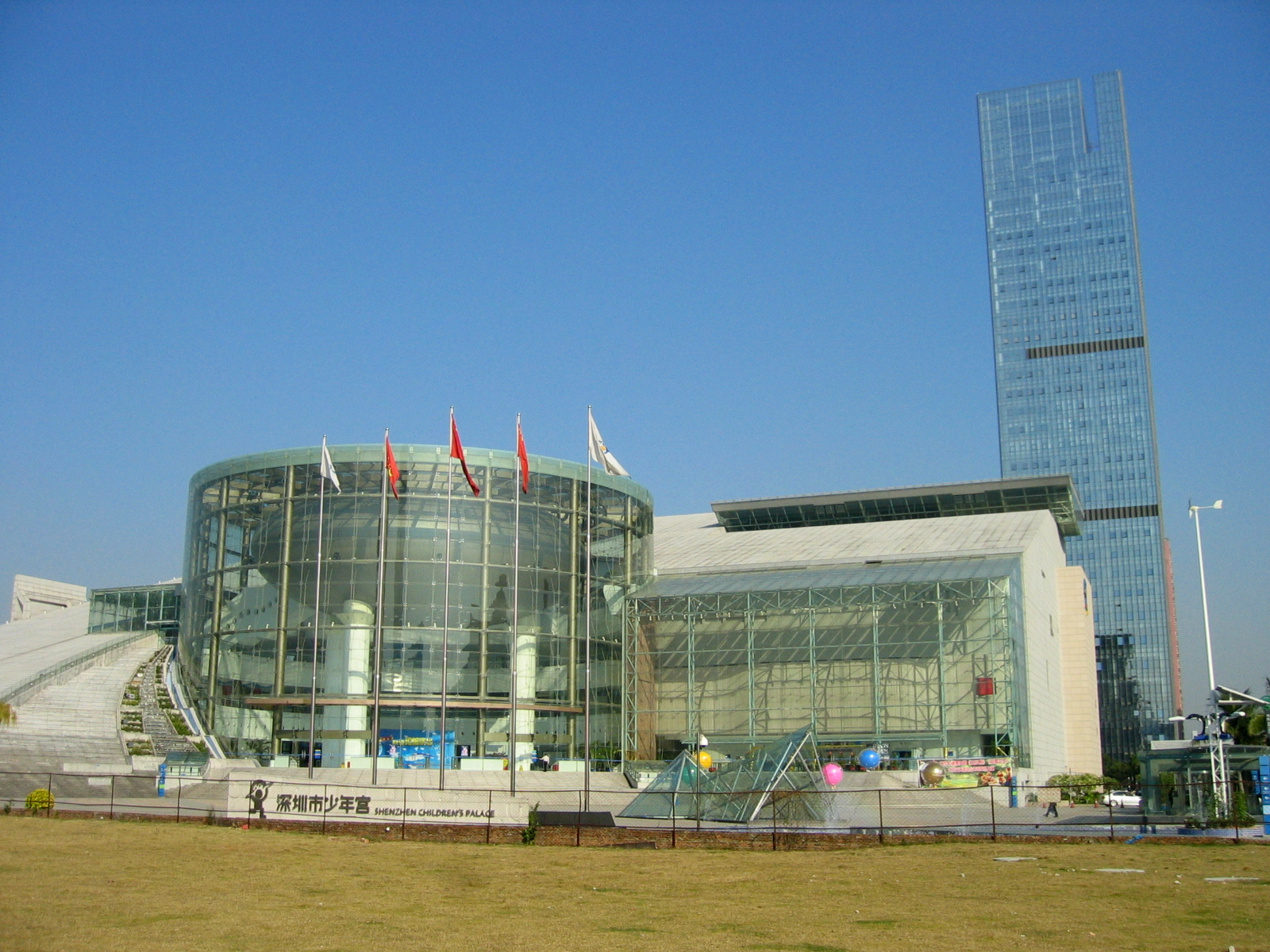
Shenzhen Children's Palace

Children's Palace station (Chinese: 少年宫站) is a station on Line 3 and Line 4 of the Shenzhen Metro. It opened on 28 December 2004. The Line 3 platforms opened on 28 June 2011. It is located under the south of Lotus Hill (Chinese: 莲花山) in Futian District, Shenzhen, China. It is adjacent to Shenzhen Children's Palace (Chinese: 深圳少年宫).

Formerly known in English by its pinyin transliteration Shaoniangong, Children's Palace was the northern terminus of Line 4, before its extension to Qinghu (Chinese: 清湖站) in the north of Shenzhen was completed in 2010.

== Station structure ==
Children's Palace is an underground station with three levels. The two side platforms are located on the lower level, while the upper level being the station concourse.

== Station layout ==
| G | - | Exits A-F |
| B1F; Concourse | Lobby | Ticket machines, customer service, shops, vending machines, transfer passage between Line 3 and Line 4 |
| B2F; 4 Platforms | Side platform, doors will open on the right |
| B2F; 4 Platforms | Platform 2 | 4 towards Futian Checkpoint (Civic Center) |
| B2F; 4 Platforms | Platform 1 | 4 towards Niuhu (Lianhua North) |
| B2F; 4 Platforms | Side platform, doors will open on the right |
| B3F; 3 Platforms | Platform 2 | 3 towards Futian Bonded Area (Futian) |
| B3F; 3 Platforms | Island platform, doors will open on the left |
| B3F; 3 Platforms | Platform 1 | 3 towards Pingdi Liulian (Lianhuacun) |

== Exits ==
| Exit | | Destination |
|---|---|---|
| Exit A1 | | Fuzhong 1st Road (E), Shenzhen Children's Palace, Jintian Road, Metro Building, Shenye Garden |
| Exit B2 | | Hongli Road (E), Tianjian Century Garden |
| Exit C | | Hongli Road (W), Shenzhen CBD Book Mall (E) |
| Exit D | | Fuzhong 1st Road (E), Jiangsu Building, New World Center |
| Exit E | | Hongli Road (S), Jiangsu Building, Yitian Road, Pengcheng 3rd Road, Fuzhong 1st Road, Shenzhen Children's Hospital, Shenzhen Concert Hall, Shenzhen CBD Book Mall |
| Exit F | F1 | Hongli Road (N), Lianhuashan Park |
| Exit F | F2 | Hongli Road (N), Guan Shanye Art Museum |
