= List of schools in Futian District =

This is a list of schools in Futian District, Shenzhen.

== Shenzhen municipal schools ==
Schools operated by the Shenzhen municipal government in Futian District include:

- Shenzhen Senior High School - Central Campus (中心校区) and the South Campus (南校区)
- Shenzhen Experimental School
- Shenzhen Foreign Languages School Junior High School Division
- Shenzhen No. 3 Senior High School (深圳市第三高级中学) Junior High School Division
- Shenzhen Arts School (深圳艺术学校) - Baishaling
- The First Vocational Technical School of Shenzhen (深圳市第一职业技术学校)
- Shenzhen Pengcheng Technical College (深圳鹏城技师学院), previously Shenzhen Second Senior Technical School (深圳市技工学校) - Fuqiang and Qiaocheng campuses

== Futian district schools ==
=== Twelve-year schools ===
- Shenzhen Huangyuyuan School
- Shenzhen Yaohua Experimental School
- Shenzhen Yunding School

=== Secondary schools ===
- Futian Foreign Languages High School (Note: 福田区外国语高级中学; 福田區外國語高級中學; Fútiánqū Wàiguóyǔ Gāojízhōngxué; fuk1 tin4 keoi1 ngoi6 gwok3 jyu5 gou1 kap1 zung1 hok6)
- Shenzhen Fujing Foreign Language School (Note: 福景外国语学校; 福景外國語學校; Fújǐng Wàiguóyǔ Xuéxiào; fuk1 ging2 ngoi6 gwok3 jyu5 hok6 haau6) - It was created in April 1999 and in 2018 it had over 2,000 students.
- Shenzhen Futian High School (Note: 福田中学; 福田中學; Fútián Zhōngxué; fuk1 tin4 zung1 hok6) - In 2018 it had about 2,600 students. It has a 40,000 m^{2} (430,000 sq ft) campus.
- Shenzhen Futian BeiHuan Middle School (Note: 北环中学; 北環中學; Běihuán Zhōngxué; bak1 waan4 zung1 hok6)
- Shenzhen Futian Hongling Middle School
- Shenzhen Futian Huafu Middle School (Note: 华富中学; 華富中學; Huáfù Zhōngxué; waa4 fu3 zung1 hok6)
- Shenzhen Futian Huanggang Middle School (Note: 皇岗中学; 皇崗中學; Huánggǎng Zhōngxué; wong4 gong1 zung1 hok6)
- Shenzhen Futian Lianhua Middle School (Note: 莲花中学; 蓮花中學; Liánhuā Zhōngxué; lin4 faa1 zung1 hok6)
- Shenzhen Futian Meilin Middle School
- Shenzhen Futian Meishan Middle School (Note: 梅山中学; 梅山中學; Méishān Zhōngxué; mui4 saan1 zung1 hok6)
- Shenzhen Futian Science Middle School (Note: 科技中学; 科技中學; Kējì Zhōngxué; fo1 gei6 zung1 hok6)
- Shenzhen Futian Shangbu Middle School (Note: 上步中学; 上步中學; Shàngbù Zhōngxué; soeng5 bou6 zung1 hok6)
- Shenzhen Futian Shangsha Middle School (Note: 上沙中学; 上沙中學; Shàngshā Zhōngxué; soeng5 saa1 zung1 hok6)
- Shenzhen Futian Xinzhou Middle School (Note: 新洲中学; 新洲中學; Xīnzhōu Zhōngxué; san1 zau1 zung1 hok6)
- Shenzhen Yongyuan Experimental School (沪教院福田实验学校??)

=== Vocational schools ===
- Shenzhen Futian Huaqiang Vocational and Technical School

=== Nine-year schools ===
- Futian Foreign Language School of Shenzhen China (Jingtian Campus and Qiaoxiang Campus)
- Futian Qiaoxiang Foreign Language School
- Green Oasis School
- Shenzhen Futian Caitian School
- Shenzhen Futian Funful Bilingual School
- Shenzhen Futian Huangpu School (primary school and middle school)
- Shenzhen Futian Nan Hua Experimental School
- Shenzhen Futian Shixia School
- Shenzhen Futian Yitian Garden School
- Shenzhen Hanlin Experimental School
- Shenzhen Nankai School

=== Primary schools ===
- The Affiliated Elementary School of SFAES
- Futian Bonded Trade Zone Foreign Languages Primary School
- The Second Affiliated Elementary School of SFAES
- Shenzhen Arts School Futian Tairan Primary School
- Shenzhen Baihua Primary School
- Shenzhen Futian Primary School
- Shenzhen Futian Donghai Experimental Primary School
- Shenzhen Futian Fuhua Primary School
- Shenzhen Futian Fumin Primary School
- Shenzhen Futian Funan Primary School
- Shenzhen Futian Fuqiang Primary School
- Shenzhen Futian Fuxin Primary School
- Shenzhen Futian Gangxia Primary School
- Shenzhen Futian Huafu Primary School - Huafu Village
- Shenzhen Futian Huaxin Primary School
- Shenzhen Futian Huanggang Primary School
- Shenzhen Futian Jinglian Primary School
- Shenzhen Futian Jinglong Primary School
- Shenzhen Futian Jingpeng Primary School
- Shenzhen Futian Jingtian Primary School
- Shenzhen Futian Jingxiu Primary School
- Shenzhen Futian Lianhua Primary School
- Shenzhen Futian Liyuan Primary School (Baihua Campus/Baishaling Campus, Tongxinling Campus, Weipeng Campus, and Zhongfu Campus)
- Shenzhen Futian Li Yuan Foreign Language Primary School (Shiling Campus, Tianqiao Campus, Xiangmi Campus, and Xiangyu Campus)
- Shenzhen Futian Lizhong Primary School
- Shenzhen Futian Lüzhou Primary School
- Shenzhen Futian Meihua Primary School
- Shenzhen Futian Meili Primary School
- Shenzhen Futian Meilin Primary School - Xiameilin Subdistrict
- Shenzhen Futian Meishan Primary School
- Shenzhen Futian Meiyuan Primary School
- Shenzhen Futian Meilian Primary School
- Shenzhen Futian Nanhua Primary School - Huaqiangnan Subdistrict
- Shenzhen Futian Nanyuan Primary School
- Shenzhen Futian Quanhai Primary School
- Shenzhen Futian Shangbu Primary School
- Shenzhen Futian Shangsha Primary School
- Shenzhen Futian Shiling Primary School

Shenzhen Futian Shixia Primary School

- Shenzhen Futian Shuiwei Primary School
- Shenzhen Futian Tianjian Primary School
- Shenzhen Futian Xiasha Primary School
- Shenzhen Futian Xinlian Primary School
- Shenzhen Futian Xinsha Primary School
- Shenzhen Futian Xinzhou Primary School
- Shenzhen Futian Yiqiang Primary School
- Shenzhen Futian Yitian Primary School
- Shenzhen Futian Yuanling Experimental Primary School
- Shenzhen Futian Yuanling Foreign Language Primary School
- Shenzhen Futian Yuanling Primary School
- Shenzhen Futian Zhongfu Primary School
- Shenzhen Mingde Experimental School (Bihai Campus and Xiangmi Campus)

== International and private schools ==
- Shenzhen College of International Education

QSI International School of Shenzhen previously had a campus in Honeylake, Futian District, adjacent to the Shenzhen Celebrities Club.
