= Shenzhen Energy Mansion =

Complex of two skyscrapers in Shenzhen, Guangdong, China

- 深圳能源大厦
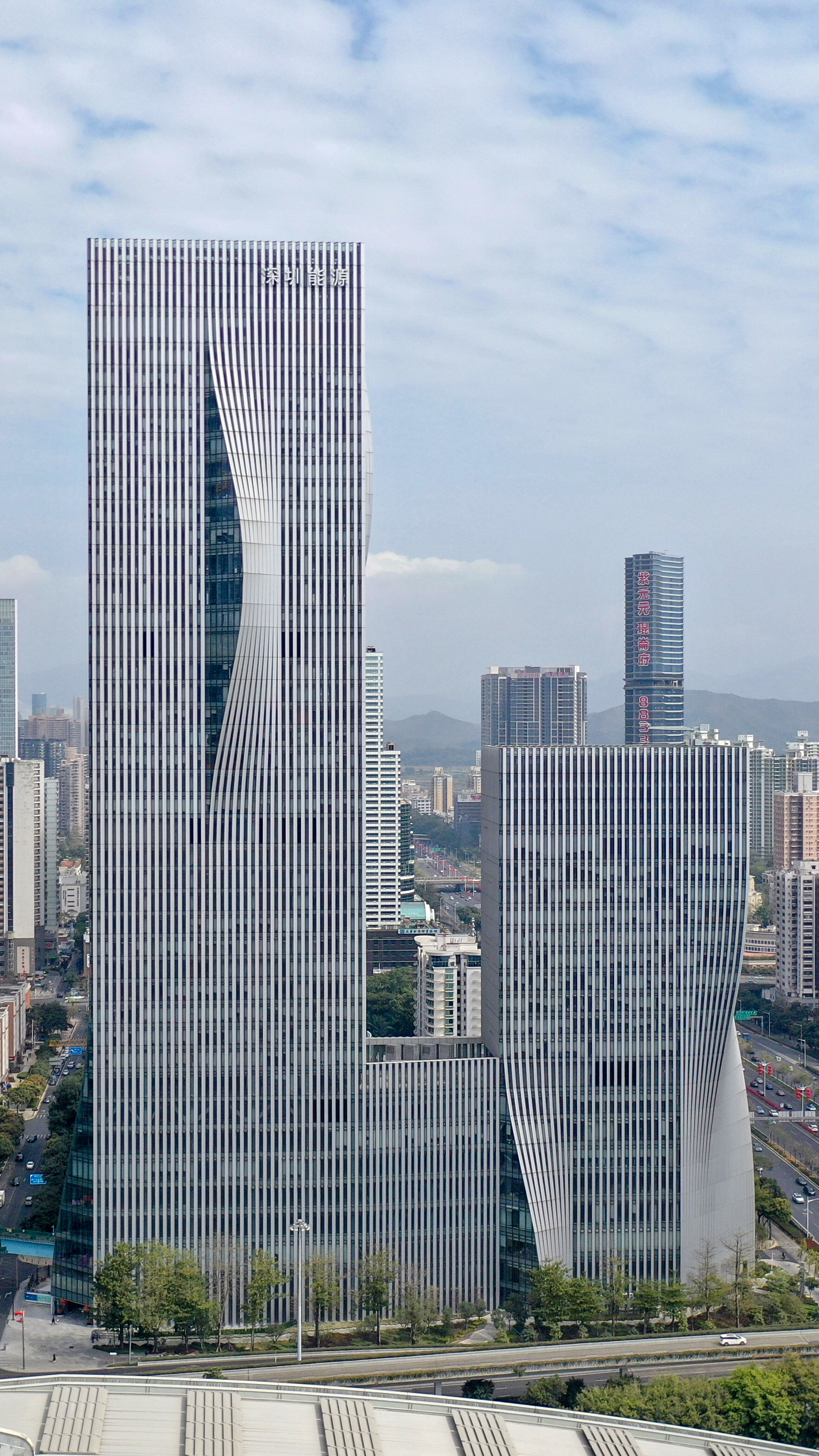
- Shenzhen Energy Mansion in February 2021
- Alternative names: Shenzhen Energy Headquarters

General information
- Status: Completed
- Type: Office
- Location: 2026 Jintian Road, Futian, Shenzhen, Guangdong, China
- Construction started: 2012
- Completed: 2017

Height
- Architectural: North. 218 m (715 ft); South. 110 m (361 ft)
- Tip: North. 219.1 m (719 ft)
- Top floor: North. 204.8 m (672 ft)

Technical details
- Floor count: 43
- Grounds: 145,000 square metres (1,560,767 sq ft)

Design and construction
- Architect: BIG
- Structural engineer: Arup

Shenzhen Energy Mansion (simplified Chinese: 深圳能源大厦; traditional Chinese: 深圳能源大廈; pinyin: shēnzhèn néngyuán dàshà) is a 218-metre (715 ft) tall skyscraper between the corner of the Jintian Road and the Binhe Boulevard, in Shenzhen, Guangdong, China. Both of the building is complete in 2017 and became the headquarters of Shenzhen Energy Group and a landmark in Futian CBD.

Designed by the Danish architectural firm BIG, the energy building consists of two towers, the north tower is about 218 metres (715 ft) high and the south tower is about 110 metres (360 ft) high, with a total construction area of 145,000 m^{2} (1,560,000 sq ft). The towers are connected by a multi-storey bridge.

== See also ==
- Ping An Finance Center
- Ping An Finance Center South
- List of tallest buildings in Shenzhen
