= Shenzhen Kaifa Technology Co., Ltd. =

Chinese electronics manufacturer

- Native name: 深圳长城开发科技股份有限公司
- Romanized name: shēn zhèn zhǎng chéng kāi fā kē jì gǔ fèn yǒu xiàn gōng sī
- Type: Public
- Traded as: SZSE: 000021
- ISIN: 000021.SZ
- Industry: Conglomerate
- Founded: 4 July 1985; 41 years ago
- Founder: Tan Wenzhi
- Headquarters: Futian, Shenzhen, China
- Area served: Worldwide
- Key people: James Zhou (Chairman)
- Revenue: ▲CN¥23.3021 billion (2018)
- Operating income: ▲CN¥0.7691 billion (2018)
- Net income: ▲CN¥0.315 billion (2018)
- Total assets: ▲CN¥0.6105 billion (2018)
- Total equity: ▲CN¥0.22 billion (2018)
- Number of employees: 25000 (09 2020)
- Website: kaifa.cn

Shenzhen Kaifa Technology Co., Ltd.
- Simplified Chinese: 深圳长城开发科技股份有限公司
- Traditional Chinese: 深圳長城開發科技股份有限公司
Transcriptions
Standard Mandarin
- Hanyu Pinyin: shēn zhèn zhǎng chéng kāi fā kē jì gǔ fèn yǒu xiàn gōng sī

Shenzhen Kaifa Technology Co., Ltd. (Chinese: 深圳长城开发科技股份有限公司; pinyin: shēn zhèn zhǎng chéng kāi fā kē jì gǔ fèn yǒu xiàn gōng sī), known professionally as Kaifa, is an electronics manufacturing services (EMS) provider. Headquartered in Shenzhen, China, operates ten R&D and manufacturing bases located in China (Shenzhen; Suzhou; Huizhou; Dongguan; Chengdu; Chongqing and Guilin), Malaysia, and Philippines, occupying a total area of more than 580,000 m^{2}. As of 2020, it has become one of China's largest manufacturers of smart meters and control systems, and one of the largest semiconductor memory module manufacturers in China. Its product, hard disk heads, accounts for more than 10% of the global market share.

== History ==
Kaifa was founded in 1985. Approved by the Shenzhen Municipal People's Government, the company was reorganized and registered as a joint stock limited company on October 8, 1993. Meanwhile, the company has been approved by the Shenzhen Securities Management Office and listed on the Shenzhen Stock Exchange. With registered capital of RMB 875,518,521, the company's legal representative is James Zhou.

In 1985, Kaifa was founded in Shenzhen, China.

In 1992, Kaifa was recognized as a high-tech enterprise in Shenzhen.

In 1994, Kaifa was listed on the Shenzhen Stock Exchange.

In 2005, Suzhou Kaifa Technology Co., Ltd. was incorporated.

In 2011, Huizhou Kaifa Technology Co., Ltd. was incorporated and Dongguan Kaifa Technology Co., Ltd. was incorporated.

In 2014, Kaifa Technology Malaysia Sdn. Bhd was incorporated.

In 2015, entered the semiconductor and IC packing and testing sector with a full acquisition of Payton Technology (Shenzhen) Co., Ltd.

In 2016, Chengdu kaifa Technology Co., Ltd. Incorporated.

In 2017, sub-brand "UCC" was founded; Kaifa Technology USA. Inc. was established; Kaifa Technology (Philippines), Inc. was established; Chongqing Kaifa Technology Co., Ltd. was registered; 株式会社 Kaifa Technology Japan was established.

In 2018, Guilin Kaifa Technology Co., Ltd. was incorporated.

In 2020, Hefei Peyton Technology Co., Ltd. was established.

In the first half of 2021, Kaifa achieved operating income of 7.955 billion yuan, a year-on-year increase of 14.43%. The net profit attributable to shareholders of listed companies is 273 million yuan, a year-on-year increase of 42.34%.

== Activities ==
In February 2020, Kaifa donated to areas affected by the COVID-19.

In July 2018, Kaifa participated in the public welfare activities for children suffering from thalassemia in Shenzhen.

In May 2017, Kaifa participated in the special activities for aiding Tibet and Xinjiang.

In October 2014, Kaifa donated to Shenzhen Charity Association.

In December 2011, Kaifa cooperated with Wuhan University to provide scholarships.

In June 2009, Kaifa sponsored poor college students from Gansu Province for further learning.

In May 2002, Kaifa funded the construction of Hope Primary School.
