= Meicun station =

Metro station in Shenzhen, Guangdong, China

Coordinates: 22°34′27″N 114°3′34″E

Meicun 梅村
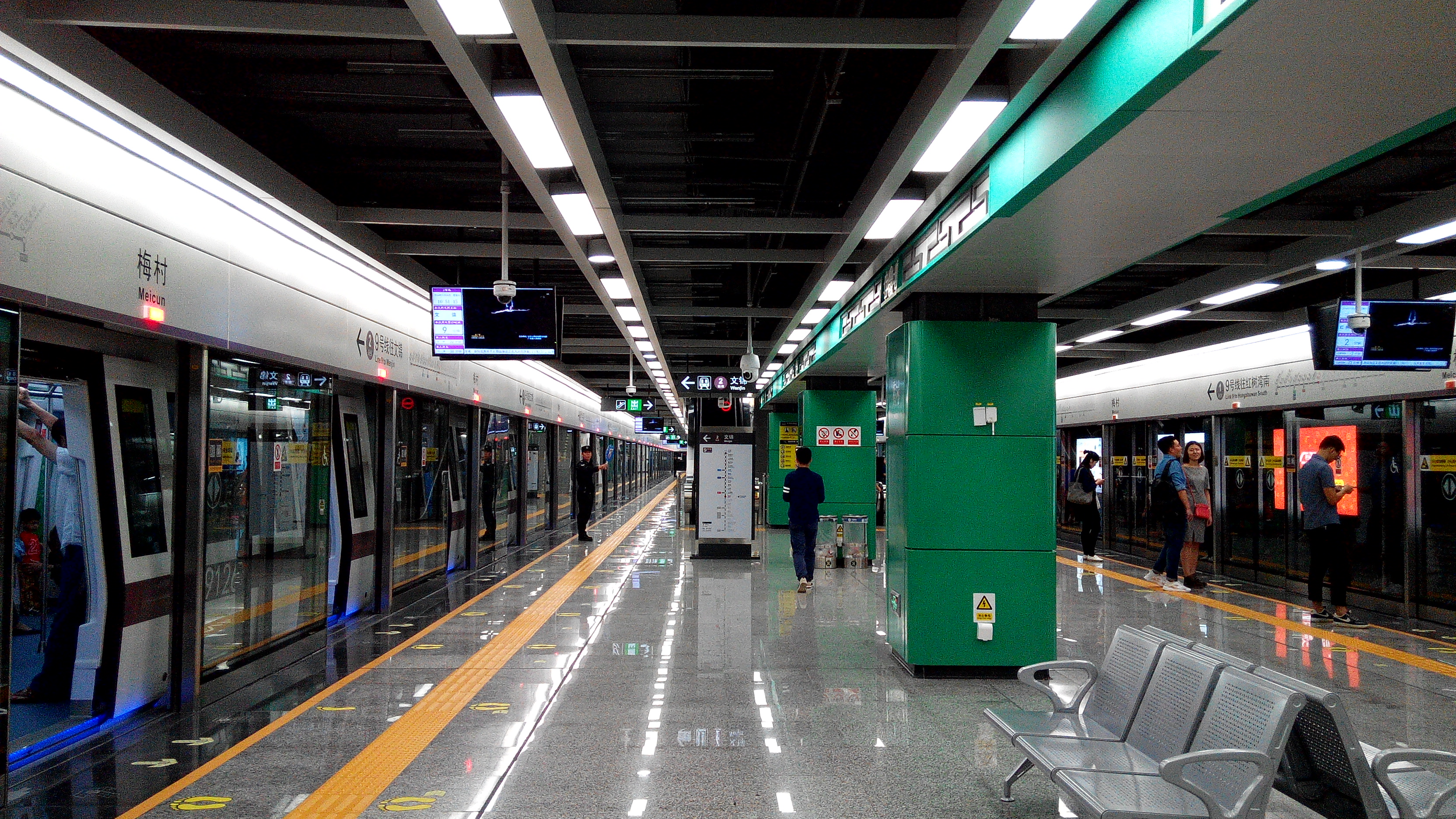

General information
- Location: Futian District, Shenzhen, Guangdong; China
- Operator: SZMC (Shenzhen Metro Group)
- Line: Line 9

History
- Opened: 28 October 2016

Services
Preceding station	Shenzhen Metro	Following station
Shangmeilin towards Wenjin	Line 9	Xiameilin towards Qianwan
Location

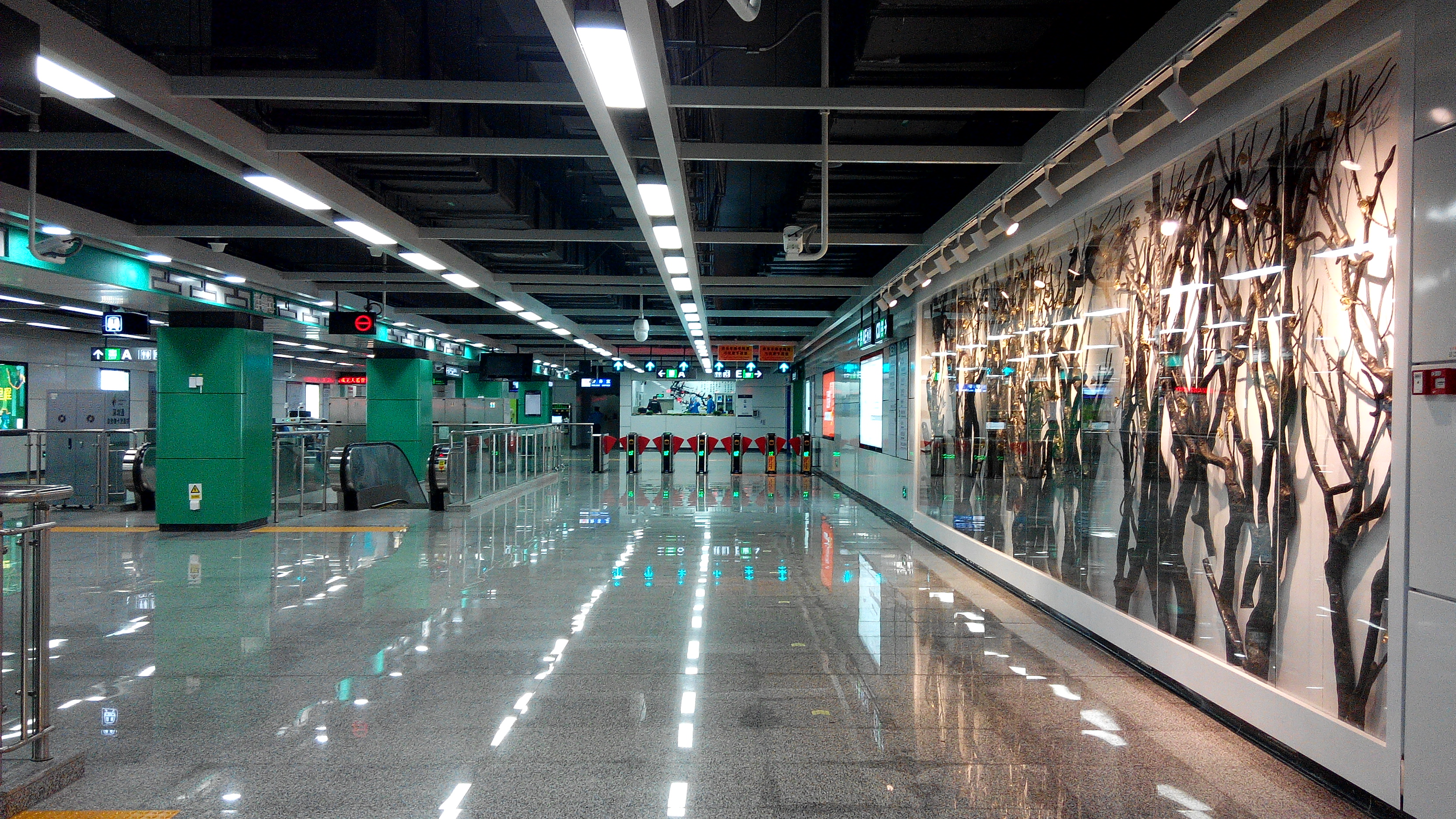
Concourse

Meicun station (Chinese: 梅村站; pinyin: Méicūn Zhàn; Jyutping: mui4 cyun1 zaam6) is a metro station of Shenzhen Metro Line 9. It opened on 28 October 2016.

== Station layout ==
G	-	Exit
B1F; Concourse	Lobby	Customer Service, Shops, Vending machines, ATMs
B2F; Platforms	Platform 1	← Line 9 towards Qianwan (Xiameilin)
B2F; Platforms	Island platform, doors will open on the left
B2F; Platforms	Platform 2	→ Line 9 towards Wenjin (Shangmeilin) →

== Exits ==
Exit		Destination
Exit A		Meilin Road (S), New World Liyuan Ge, Shangmeilin Culture & Sports Park
Exit B		Reserved
Exit C	C1	Meicun Road (W), Meilin Sancun
Exit C	C2	Meicun Road (E), Meilin Road (S), Meilin Sicun, Meilin Ge
Exit D		Meilin Road (N), Gong'an Street, Metro Sub-bureau of Shenzhen Public Safety Bureau, Zhongkang Residence Community
Exit E		Meilin Road (N)
