= Xiameilin station =

Metro station in Shenzhen, China

Coordinates: 22°34′17″N 114°2′53″E

Xiameilin 下梅林
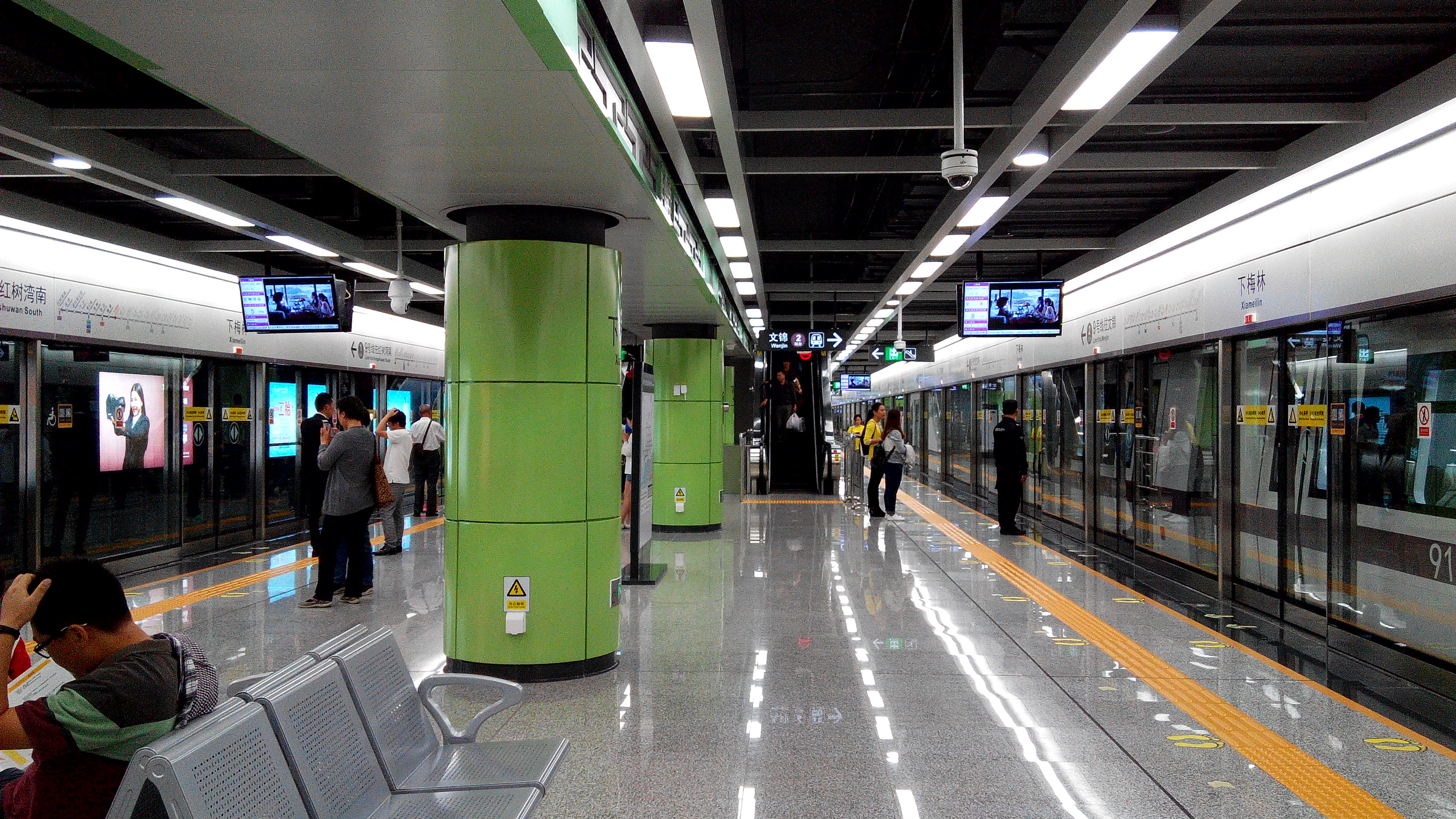

General information
- Location: Futian District, Shenzhen, Guangdong; China
- Operated by: SZMC (Shenzhen Metro Group)
- Line: Line 9

History
- Opened: 28 October 2016

Services
Preceding station	Shenzhen Metro	Following station
Meicun towards Wenjin	Line 9	Meijing towards Qianwan
Location

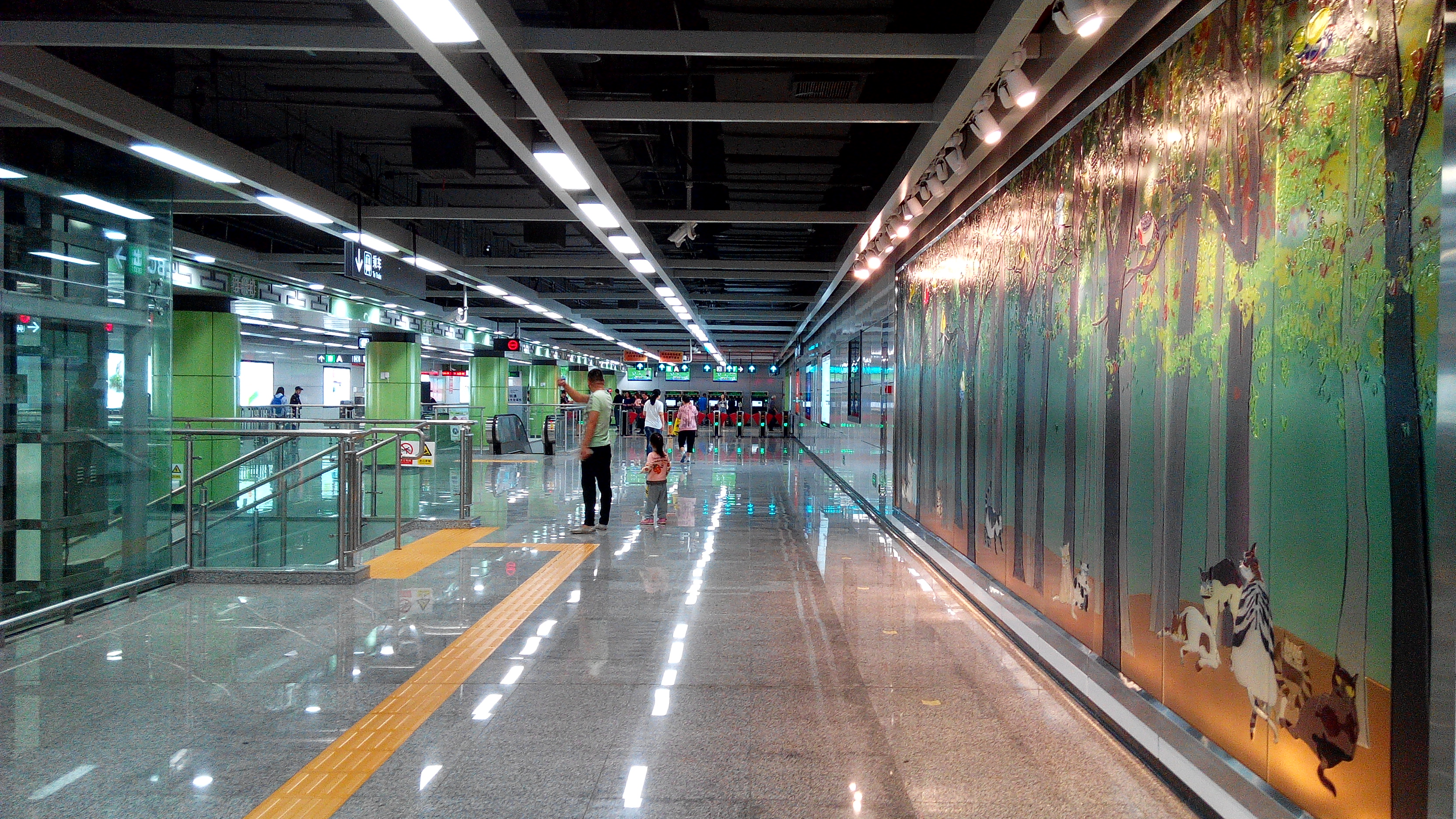
Concourse

Xiameilin station (Chinese: 下梅林站; pinyin: Xiàméilín Zhàn; Jyutping: haa6 mui4 lam4 zaam6) is a metro station of Shenzhen Metro Line 9. It opened on 28 October 2016.
