= Jupiter Museum of Art =

Contemporary art museum in Shenzhen, China

- 木星美术馆
- Established: 2019
- Location: 6 Lanhua Road, Futian District, Shenzhen, Guangdong Province, China 518038
- Type: Contemporary art museum
- Founder: Lü Hongrong
- Public transit access: Metro Line 3: Futian Bonded Area Station – Exit: B
- Website: www.j-m-a.org (in Chinese)

The Jupiter Museum of Art (Chinese: 木星美术馆) is a contemporary art museum in Futian District, Shenzhen, China.

Founded privately by Lü Hongrong in 2019, the original Jupiter Museum opened at a time when contemporary art exhibition venues were expanding quickly in China. At its maximum size, the museum occupied 11,000 square meters. By the time it closed as a private institution, the size had reduced to 3,000 square meters. The museum is now part of a public cultural program, located near the Futian Bonded Area Station on the metro, close to the border with Hong Kong.

== See also ==
- List of museums in China
