= Dabaihui Plaza =

Supertall skyscraper in Shenzhen, Guangdong, China

- 大百汇广场
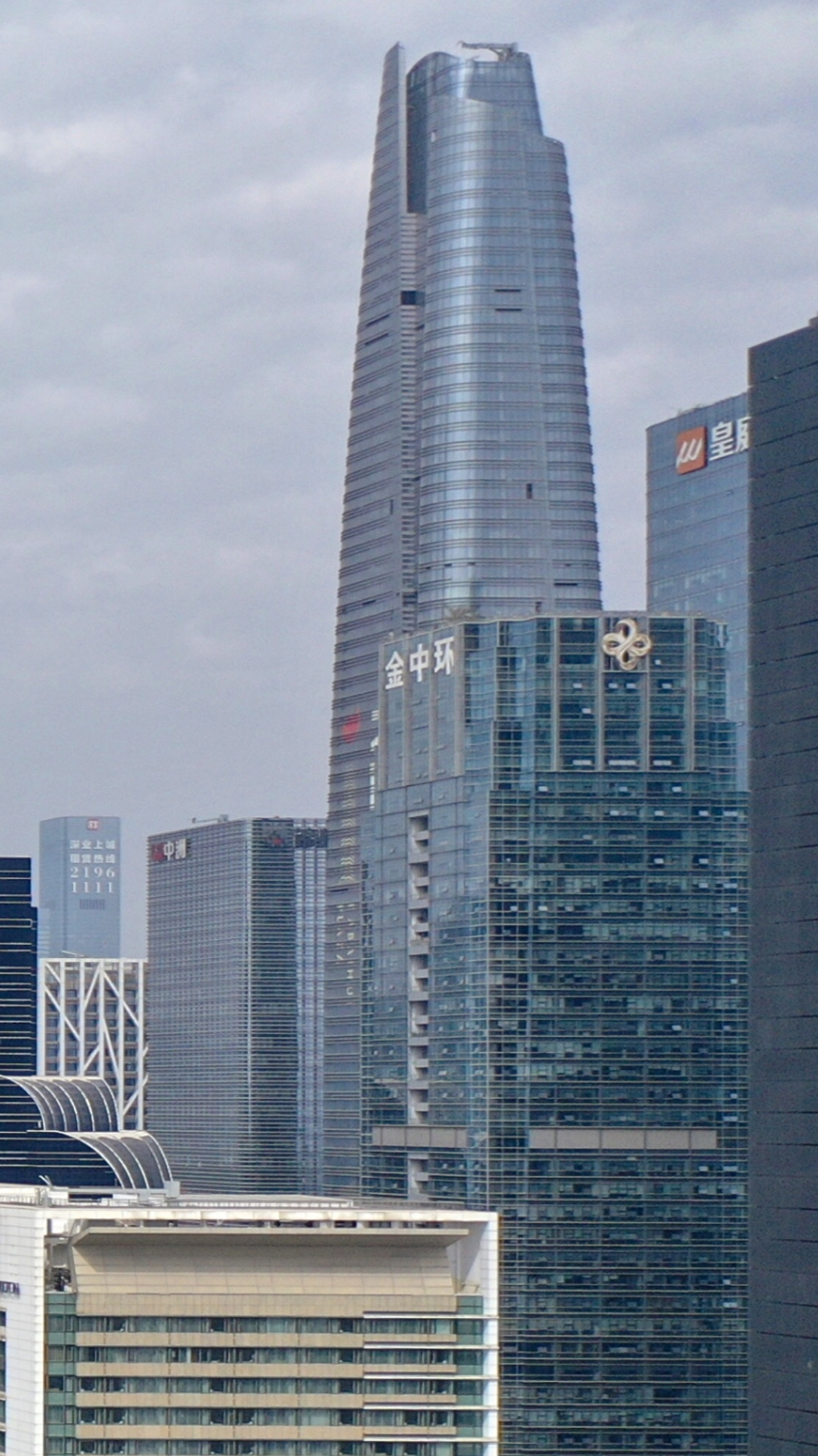
- Dabaihui Plaza in February 2021
- Interactive map of the Dabaihui Plaza area
- Alternative names: Shenzhen Center

General information
- Status: Completed
- Type: Office / Residential
- Location: 99 Gossip Second Road, Futian District, Shenzhen, Guangdong, China
- Coordinates: 22°32′20″N 114°3′32″E
- Construction started: 2012
- Completed: 2021

Height
- Architectural: 375.5 m (1,232 ft)
- Tip: 375.5 m (1,232 ft)
- Top floor: 306.9 m (1,007 ft)

Technical details
- Floor count: 70
- Floor area: 154,133 m^{2} (1,659,070 sq ft)

Design and construction
- Architect: Kohn Pedersen Fox

Dabaihui Plaza
- Simplified Chinese: 大百汇广场
- Traditional Chinese: 大百匯廣場
Transcriptions
Standard Mandarin
- Hanyu Pinyin: dàbǎihuì guǎngchǎng
Yue: Cantonese
- Jyutping: daai^{6}baak^{3}wui^{6}gwong^{2}cheung^{4}

Dabaihui Plaza (Chinese: 大百汇广场) is a supertall skyscraper located in Shenzhen, Guangdong, China. It is 375.5 metres (1,232 ft) tall. Construction began in 2012 and ended in 2021.

== See also ==
- List of tallest buildings in Shenzhen
- List of tallest buildings in China
- List of tallest buildings in the world
