= Shangmeilin station =

Metro station in Shenzhen, Guangdong, China

Coordinates: 22°34′13″N 114°3′34″E

Shangmeilin 上梅林
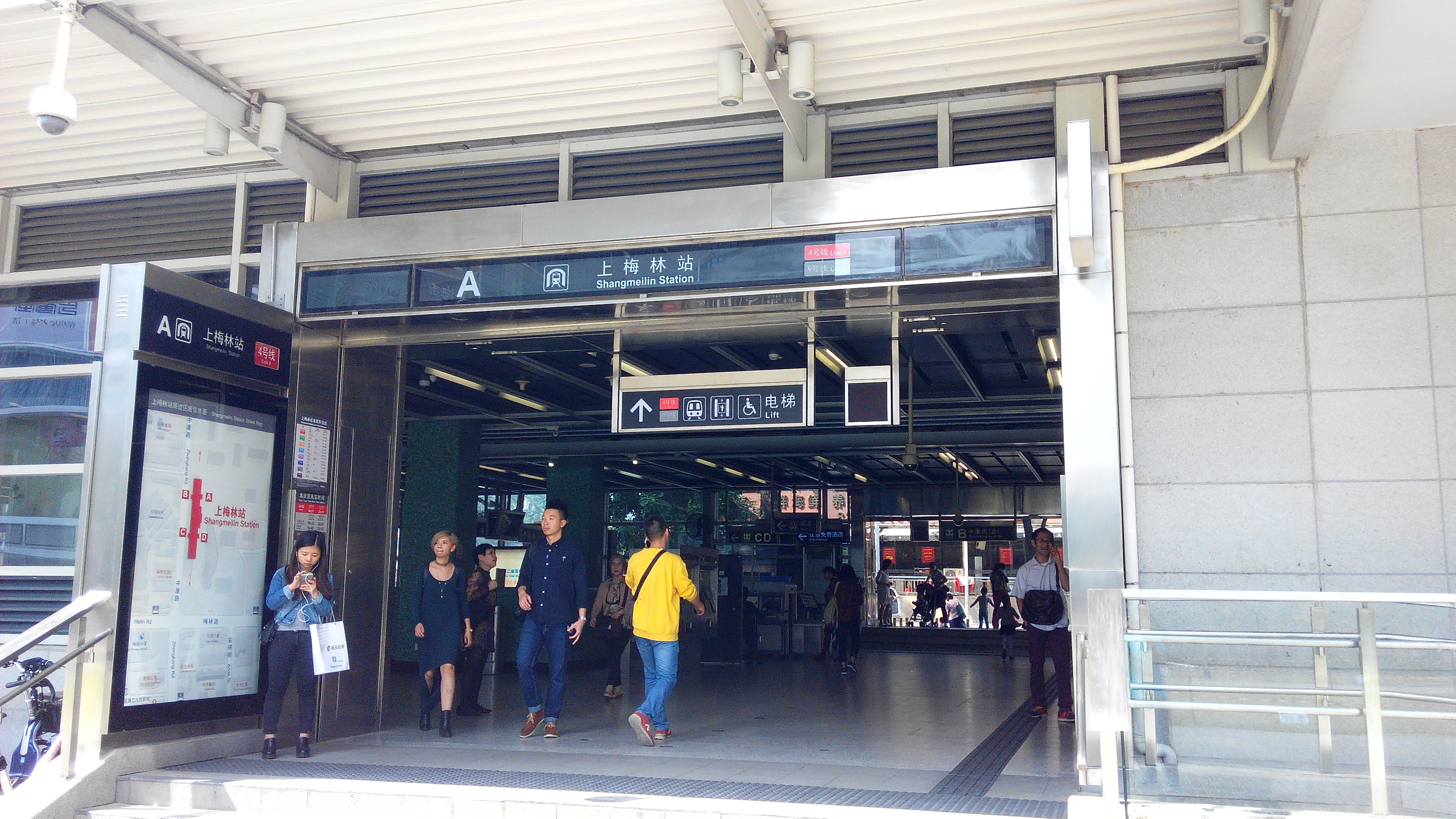

General information
- Location: Futian District, Shenzhen, Guangdong; China
- Operator: MTR Corporation (Shenzhen)
- Lines: Line 4; Line 9
- Platforms: 4 (2 island platforms)
- Tracks: 4

Construction
- Structure type: Underground
- Accessible: Yes

History
- Opened: 16 June 2011 (Line 4); 28 October 2016 (Line 9)

Services
| Preceding station | Shenzhen Metro | Following station |
|---|---|---|
| Minle towards Niuhu | Line 4 | Lianhua North towards Futian Checkpoint |
| Maling towards Wenjin | Line 9 | Meicun towards Qianwan |
Location

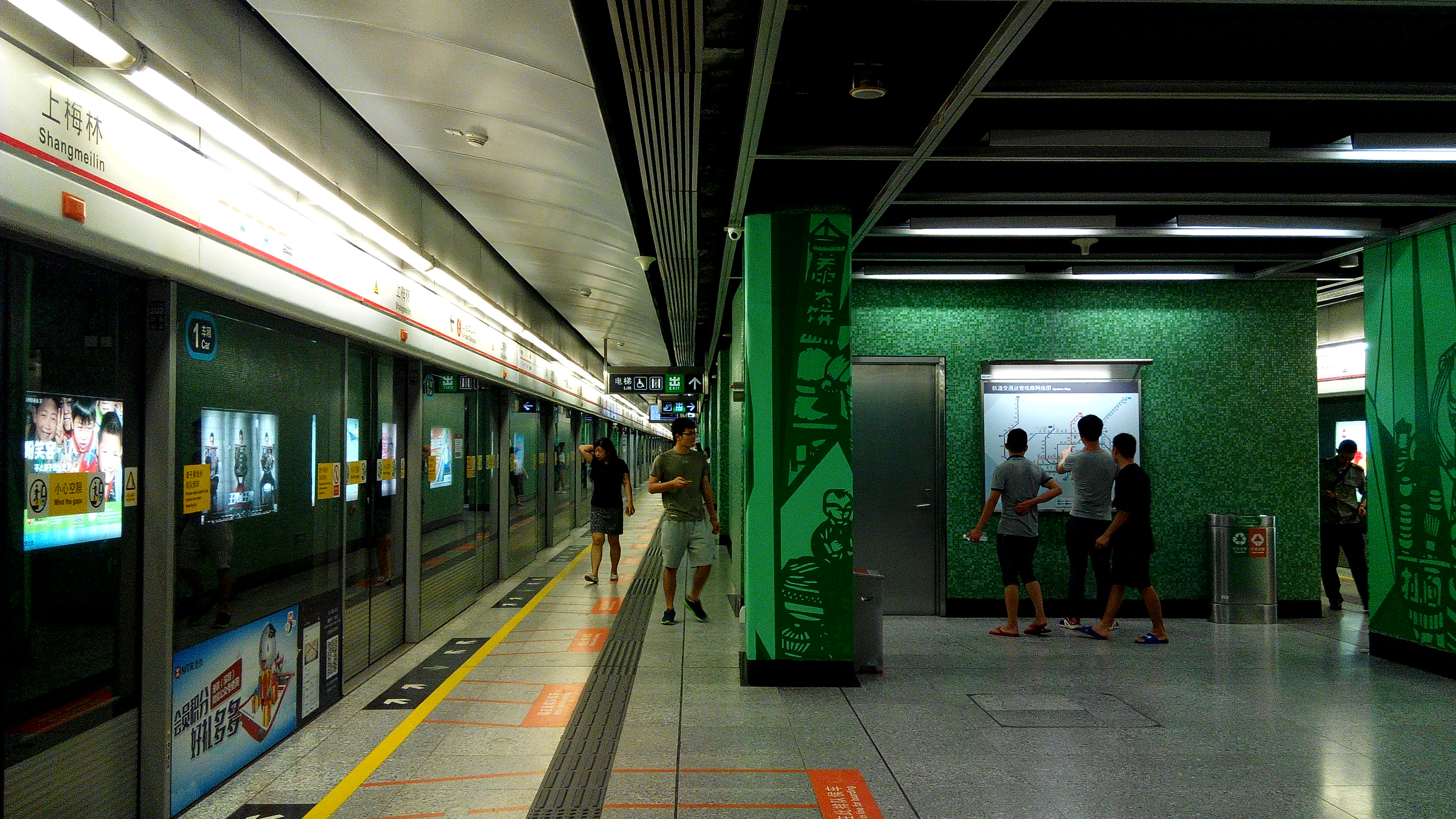
Line 4 platforms

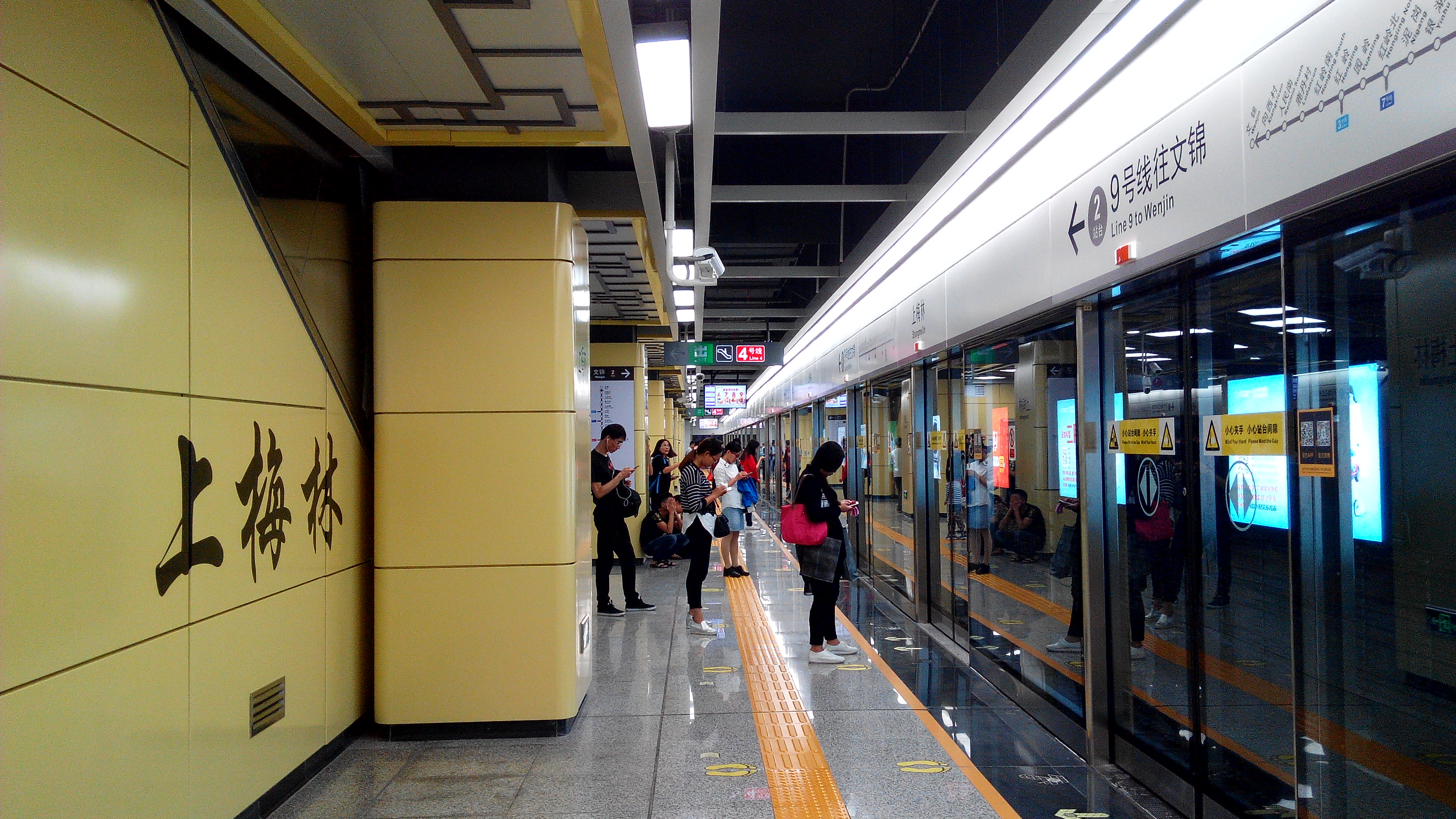
Line 9 platforms

Shangmeilin station (Chinese: 上梅林站; pinyin: Shàngméilín Zhàn; Jyutping: soeng6 mui4 lam4 zaam6) is a station on Line 4 and Line 9 of the Shenzhen Metro. Line 4 platforms opened on 16 June 2011 and Line 9 platforms opened on 28 October 2016.

== Station layout ==
| G Concourse | Lobby of Line 4 | Customer service, shops, vending machines, ATMs, exit Transfer passage between Line 4 and Line 9 |
| B1F; Concourse | Lobby of Line 9 | Customer service, shops, vending machines, ATMs; Transfer passage between Line 4 and Line 9 |
| B2F; Platforms | Platform 2 | ← Line 4 towards Futian Checkpoint (Lianhua North) |
| B2F; Platforms | Island platform, doors will open on the left |
| B2F; Platforms | Platform 1 | → Line 4 towards Niuhu (Minle) → |
| B3F; Platforms | Platform 1 | ← Line 9 towards Qianwan (Meicun) |
| B3F; Platforms | Island platform, doors will open on the left |
| B3F; Platforms | Platform 2 | → Line 9 towards Wenjin (Maling) → |

== Exits ==
| Exit | | Destination |
|---|---|---|
| Exit B | | Traffic Monitoring Building, Zhongkang Innovation Park, Converge Dragon Garden, Yilinyayuan, Shenzhen Futian District Urban, Management Bureau, Shenzhen Environmental Mornitoring Center, Meihua Primary School |
| Exit C | | Vanke Building, Yijing Building, Haikang Building, Zhongkang Residential Area, Huafu Xinju, Fumao Garden, Meilin Sicun, Dongmei Apartment, Zhenyemeiyuan, Shenbao Garden, Jinyan Garden, Kaifeng Garden, Rainbow, Zhongkang Park, Exit-entry Administrative Division of Shenzhen Public Security Bureau, No. 2 People's Hospital, Futian District, Shanshui Hotel, 3 Best Inn, Kaifeng Road North, Vanke Building, Shangmeilin Bus Terminal, Meilin Hospital, Meilinge |
| Exit E | | Zhongkang Road, Fumao Garden |
| Exit F | | Ideal City |
| Exit G | | South Side of Meilin Road, East Side of Zhongkang Road, Yijing building |
| Exit H | | South Side of Meilin Road, West Side of Kaifeng Road, Haikang Building, Ande Street |
| Exit J | J1 | Meilin Road (N), Ideal Mansion |
| Exit J | J2 | Ideal City |

== Around the station ==
- Shenzhen Mosque
