= Lianhua North station =

Metro station in Shenzhen, China

Coordinates: 22°33′39″N 114°3′33″E

Lianhua North 莲花北
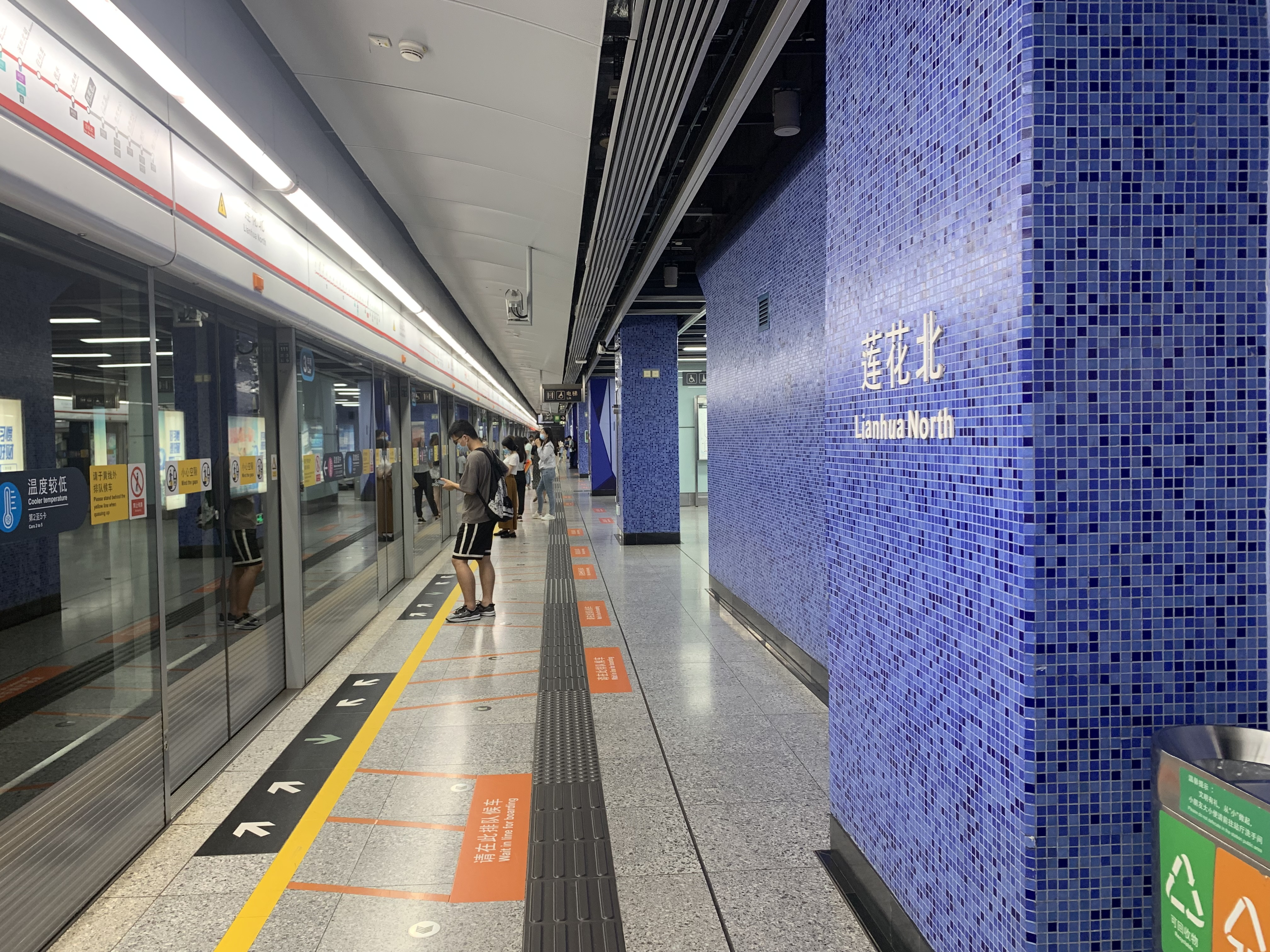

General information
- Location: Futian District, Shenzhen, Guangdong; China
- Operator: MTR Corporation (Shenzhen)
- Line: Line 4
- Platforms: 2 (1 island platform)
- Tracks: 2

Construction
- Structure type: Underground
- Accessible: Yes

History
- Opened: 16 June 2011

Services
Preceding station	Shenzhen Metro	Following station
Shangmeilin towards Niuhu	Line 4	Children's Palace towards Futian Checkpoint
Location

Lianhua North station (Chinese: 莲花北站; pinyin: Liánhuā Běi Zhàn) is a station on Line 4 of the Shenzhen Metro. It opened with the extension of Line 4 on 16 June 2011.

== Station layout ==
G	-	Exit
B1F; Concourse	Lobby	Customer Service, Shops, Vending machines, ATMs
B2F; Platforms	Platform 2	← Line 4 towards Futian Checkpoint (Children's Palace)
B2F; Platforms	Island platform, doors will open on the left
B2F; Platforms	Platform 1	→ Line 4 towards Niuhu (Shangmeilin) →

== Exits ==
Exit		Destination
Exit A	A1	Caitian School, Citian Village (1)
Exit A	A2	Caitian Village, Shuiyuan Building, Anju Garden, Water Affairs Bureau of Shenzhen Municipality
Exit B		Sculpture Homes, Duoli Building, Futian International E-Commerce Industrial Park, Yuntiancun, New World, Shanyueju, Lianfen Garden, Huamao Garden, Hongwei Garden, Qinglian Apartment, Lingxiu Mingyuan, Xianke Garden, Aoshida Garden, Shangmeilin Xincun, Dongfang Fuyuan, Lianhua Police Station, Caitian Village (2), Shangmeilin, Shangmeilin Market
