= Shenzhen Energy =

Chinese power generation company

Shenzhen Energy Group Company Limited 深圳能源集團股份有限公司

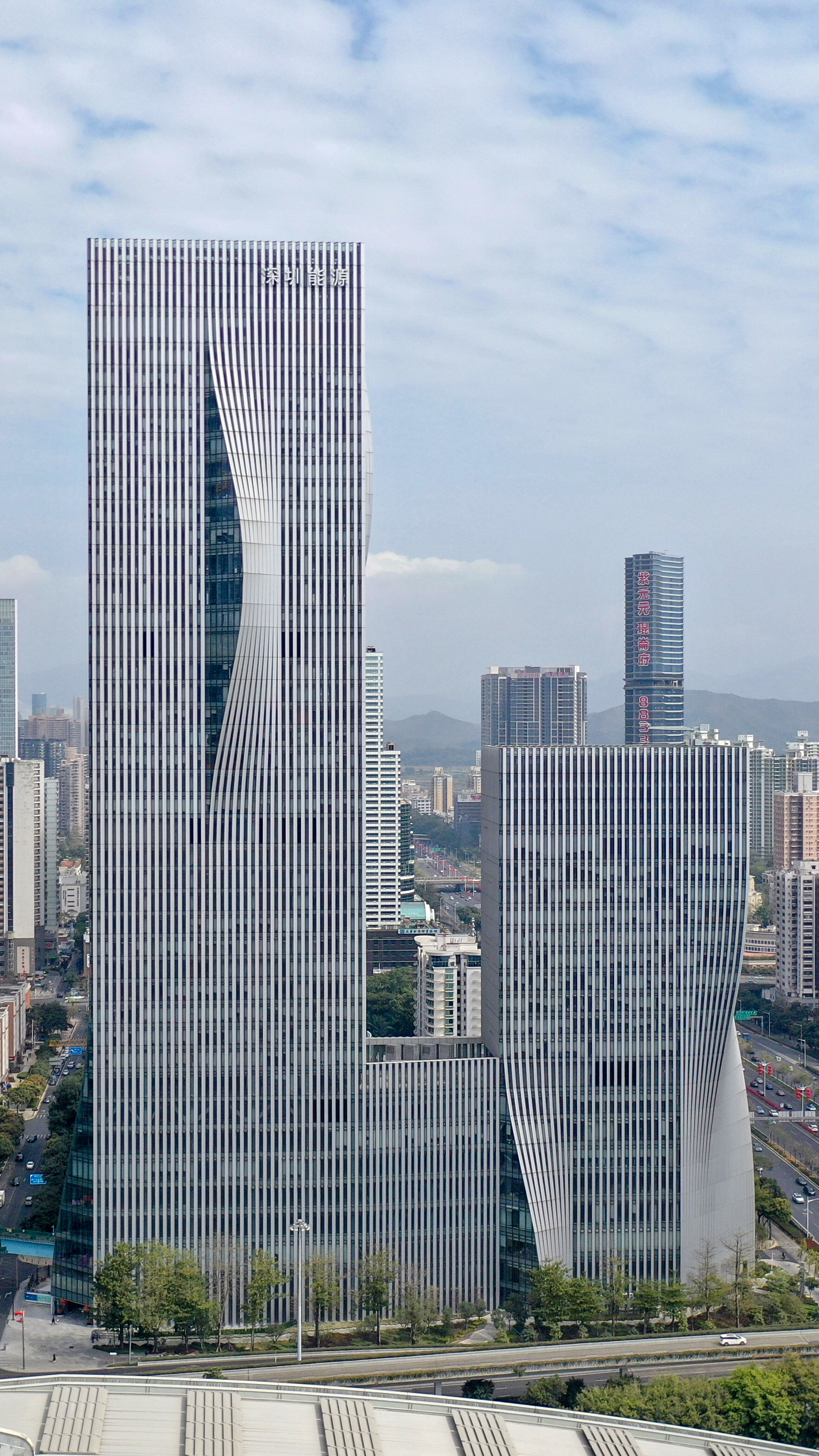
- Shenzhen Energy Mansion in Futian District, Shenzhen
- Type: Public
- Traded as: SZSE: 000027
- Industry: Power generation
- Founded: 1993
- Headquarters: Shenzhen, Guangdong, People's Republic of China
- Area served: China
- Key people: Chairman: Mr. Gao Zimin
- Parent: Shenzhen Energy Corporation
- Website: www.sec.com.cn

Shenzhen Energy Group Company Limited, formerly Shenzhen Energy Investment Company Limited, is one of the main power generation companies in Shenzhen, Guangdong, China. It involves in developing all types of energies, researching and investing high new energy-related technologies. Huaneng Power International is now the second largest shareholder of Shenzhen Energy.

On 3 April 2010 a tanker owned by the Shenzhen Energy Group ran aground on Australia's Great Barrier Reef after straying out of shipping lanes.

== Examples of foreign projects ==
Shenzhen Energy provided most of the capital to build the Sunon Asogli Power Plant in Ghana.

== 2010 Great Barrier Reef grounding ==
On 3 April 2010 MV Shen Neng 1 ran aground approximately 38 nautical miles (70 km; 44 mi) east of Great Keppel Island, Australia. The ship, which was carrying 975 tonnes of heavy bunker fuel oil, began leaking oil in the Great Barrier Reef Marine Park, which is closed to commercial shipping (it had been 15 nautical miles (28 km; 17 mi) off course). The Australian Maritime Safety Authority has revealed that a shipping plan was lodged for Shen Neng 1 to travel between Douglas Shoal and the Capricorn Group, where there is a gap of 6 nautical miles (11 km; 6.9 mi).
