= Affiliated High School of Peking University, Shenzhen =

Public school in Shenzhen, Guangdong, China

Location
- Shenzhen, Guangdong; China
- 22.5654°N 114.0462°E

Information
- Type: Public School
- Established: 1993
- Faculty: ~127
- Enrollment: ~1760
- Campus: 23,455 square metres (252,470 ft^{2})
- Website: mlzx.cn

Affiliated High School of Peking University, Shenzhen
- Simplified Chinese: 北京大学附属中学深圳学校
- Traditional Chinese: 北京大學附屬中學深圳學校
Transcriptions
Standard Mandarin
- Hanyu Pinyin: Shēnzhèn Méilín Zhōngxué
Yue: Cantonese
- Jyutping: sam1 zan3 mui4 lam4 zung1 hok6

Affiliated High School of Peking University, Shenzhen (Chinese: 北京大学附属中学深圳学校) is an ordinary high school in the Futian District of Shenzhen City, Guangdong Province, China.

== History ==
Established in 1993, formerly known as Shenzhen Meilin Middle School.
