= Hongling Middle School =

School in Shenzhen, China

Coordinates: 22.5592°N 114.0124°E

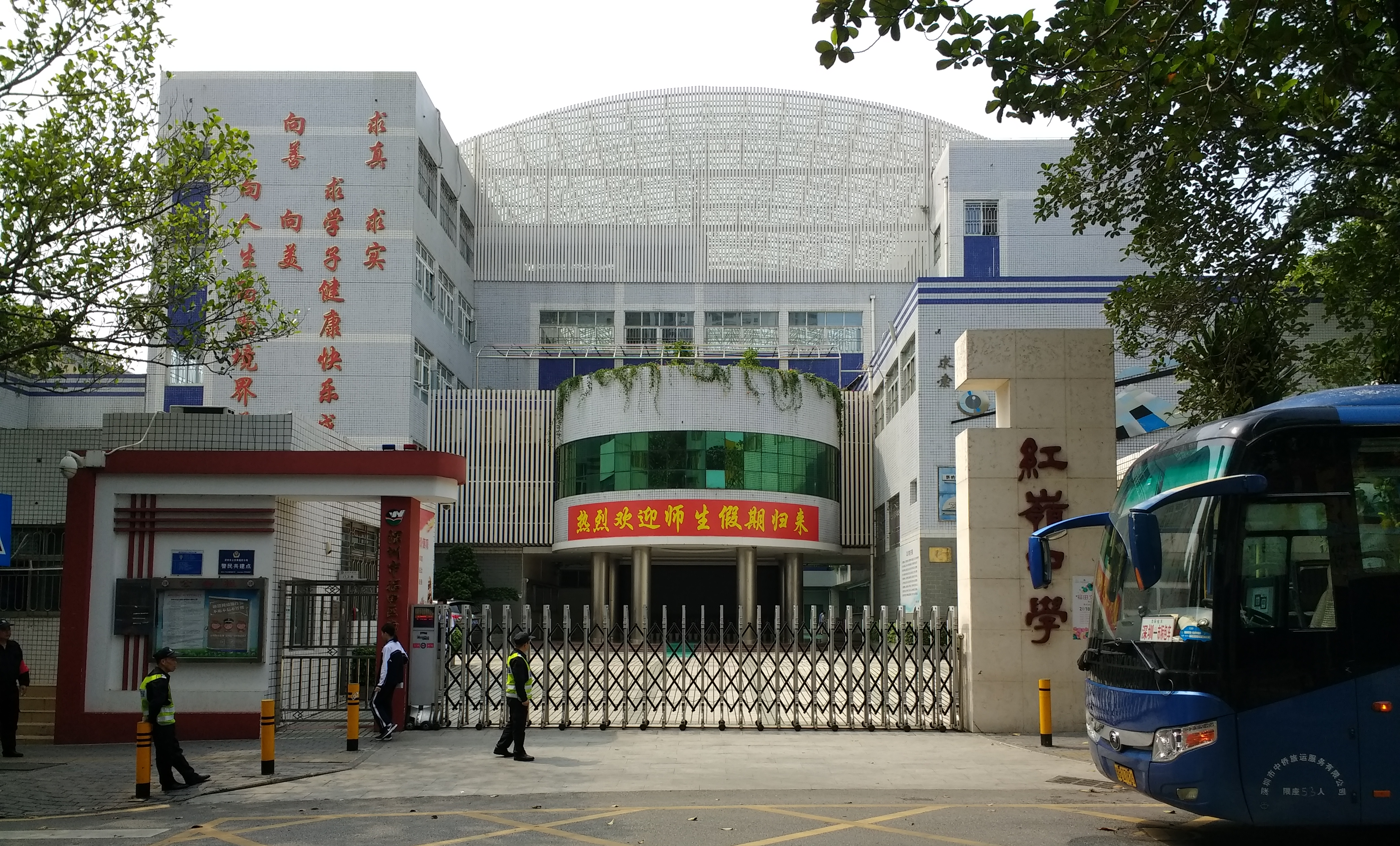
A picture of Hongling Middle School

Shenzhen Hongling Middle School (Chinese: 深圳市红岭中学; pinyin: Shēnzhènshì Hónglǐng Zhōngxué) is a secondary junior and senior high school in Shenzhen, China. Its campus are located in the Futian District.

Hongling Middle School has around three thousand students. Most of its students come from Shenzhen.
