= Green Oasis School =

- 深圳城市绿洲学校
- Shenzhen, Guangdong, China; China

Information
- Type: Private Chinese; Secondary; Primary
- Motto: Educate – Nurture – Inspire Excellence
- Established: 2001
- School district: Futian
- Principal: Mr. Peter Garnhum(not anymore)
- Grades: Years 1 – 9
- Enrollment: 663
- Hours in school day: 6
- Houses: Pegasus (GOS)/Topaz (SOIS); Kraken (GOS)/Sapphire (SOIS); Phoenix (GOS)/Ruby (SOIS); Minotaur (GOS)/Emerald (SOIS)
- Website: greenoasis.org.cn (Archived)

Green Oasis School
- Simplified Chinese: 城市绿洲学校
- Traditional Chinese: 城市綠洲學校
- Literal meaning: City Oasis School
Transcriptions
Standard Mandarin
- Hanyu Pinyin: Chéngshì Lǜzhōu Xuéxiào
Yue: Cantonese
- Jyutping: sing4 si5 luk6 zau1 hok6 haau6

Green Oasis School (Chinese: 城市绿洲学校) is an international school in Tianmian Village (田面村), Futian District, Shenzhen.

Green Oasis School is made up of a primary school and a secondary school. The primary school runs from Y1- Y6, with 3-4 classes per year. Each class consists of 15-25 children aged 5–11, a homeroom teacher, and a TA. The secondary school runs from Y7-Y9, with 4-5 classes per year. Each class consists of 20-25 children aged 11–15. The secondary school teaches a wide variety of courses such as Art, English, Humanities, Science, Chinese, Math, PE, Music (choir, winds and strings), Dance, PSHE, Computing and Drama. The School follows the UK national curriculum for most subjects. In primary school, the Chinese class will follow the Chinese national curriculum. In secondary school, Math and Chinese both follow the Chinese national curriculum. A English Math class that follows the UK national curriculum is also offered, along with Chinese learning assistance. In 2026, Green Oasis School celebrated its 25th anniversary, which is also a silver anniversary.
