= Futian, Shenzhen =

Futian 福田区
- District
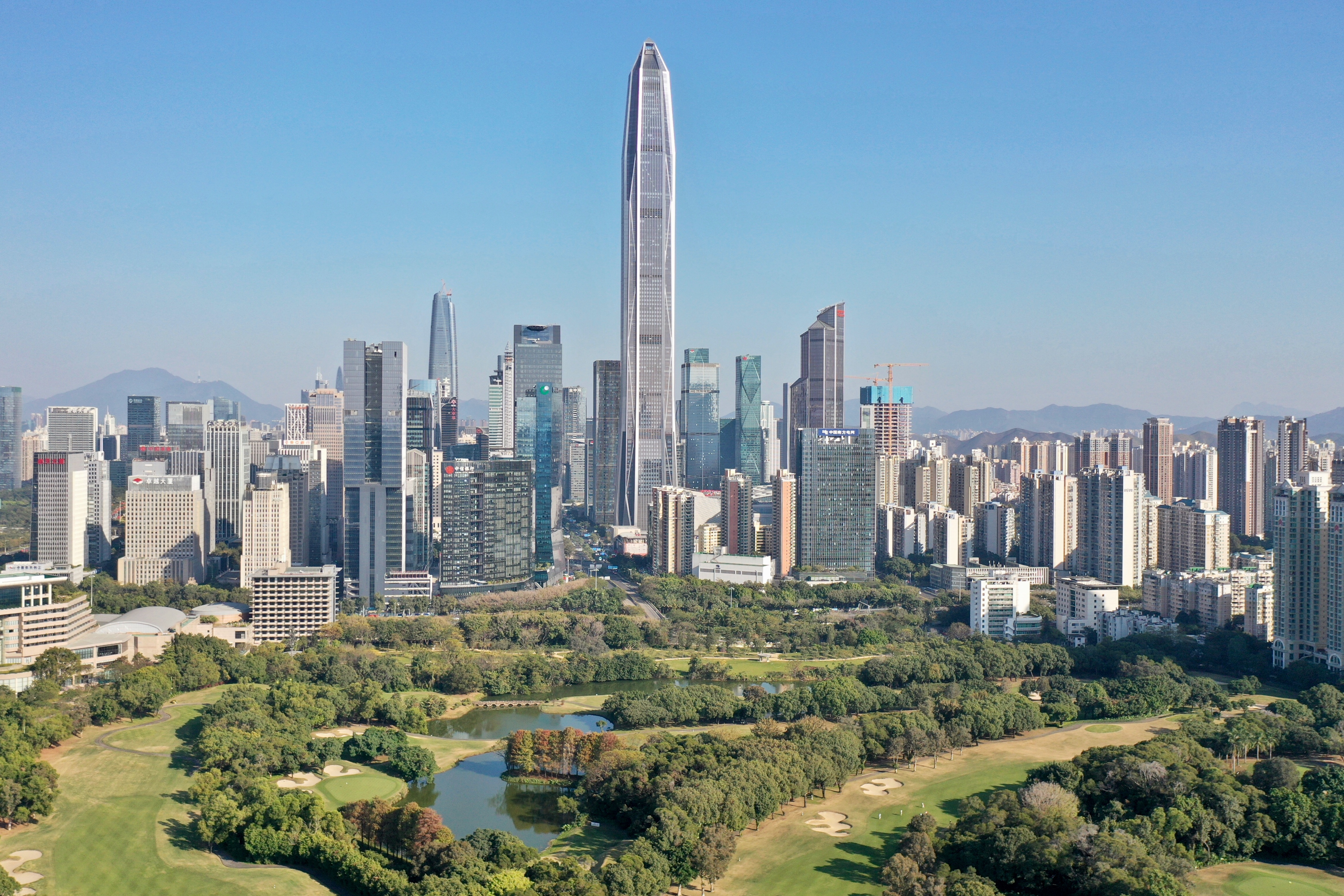
- Futian CBD and Zhongxin Park

- Location (highlighted in brown ) within Shenzhen City
- Interactive map of Futian
- Location in Guangdong
- Coordinates: 22°31′21″N 114°03′21″E
- Country: China
- Province: Guangdong
- Sub-provincial city: Shenzhen

Area
  - Total: 78.8 km^{2} (30.4 sq mi)

Population (2022)
  - Total: 1,553,200
  - Density: 19,700/km^{2} (51,100/sq mi)
- Time zone: UTC+8 (China Standard)
- Area code: 0755
- Website: archived link

Chinese name
- Simplified Chinese: 福田区
- Traditional Chinese: 福田區
- Hanyu Pinyin: Fútián Qū
- Literal meaning: "Blessed fields"
Transcriptions
Standard Mandarin
- Hanyu Pinyin: Fútián Qū
Yue: Cantonese
- Jyutping: fuk^{1}tin^{4} keoi^{1}

Futian District (simplified Chinese: 福田区; traditional Chinese: 福田區; pinyin: Fútián Qū; Jyutping: fuk^{1}tin^{4} keoi^{1}) is one of the nine districts comprising the city of Shenzhen, China. The district is home to the government and Municipal Committee of Shenzhen, as well as one of the city's central business district (CBD).

== Name ==
There are two theories concerning the origin of the district's name:

- From an inscription dating to the Song dynasty (960–1297) which reads: "Lakes and mountains are blessed with fertile farmlands" (湖山擁福, 田地生輝).
- Written records showing that people from Shangsha Village built houses in Songziling in 1192; their farmlands were cultivated in lattice shapes, which in Chinese is a homophone for "Futian" meaning "blessed fields".

== History ==
Luohu District was established in April 1979, one month after Shenzhen was promoted to city status. Futian, and another area called Fucheng (附城), became communes within the Luohu District.

Futian became part of the Shenzhen Special Economic Zone after it was designated in 1980. It then became a subdistrict under the district of Shangbu (上步).

Futian, along with Nanshan, was promoted to district status in October 1990. The Shangbu district, which had governed the Futian subdistrict the previous decade, became a part of the Futian district. The district government was established on Shennan Middle Road.

Rapid urbanization occurred in the late 20th century; the agricultural land which once made up a vast majority of Luohu had shrunk to an area of only 12.26 km^{2} (4.73 sq mi) by 2003.

== Economy ==
As of 2022, the nominal Gross Domestic Product (GDP) of Futian District is 551.45 billion CNY (US$ 81.85 billion), second in the city behind neighboring Nanshan District. This figure is the third highest of all districts belonging to municipal-level cities in China. The Central Business District (CBD) of Shenzhen is a planned development project that began in the early 1990s. Located within the Futian district, it comprises an area of 607 hectares. The four sides of the district are delineated by Binhe Dadao, Lianhua Road, Xinzhou Road and Caitian Road.

Many office high-rises and government buildings are located in the CBD, some of which are prominent buildings in Shenzhen, such as the Shenzhen City Hall (Civic Center), Shenzhen Library, Shenzhen Concert Hall, Shenzhen Development Bank building and the Shenzhen Convention and Exhibition Center. Located directly north of the CBD is Lianhuashan Park.

Located in Futian District, Shenzhen City, Guangdong Province, Lotus Hill Park is an urban oasis of natural beauty, cultural heritage and recreation. Covering an area of about 194 hectares, the park was completed in 1997 and consists of several major parts, including a tropical-style lawn area in the south of the park, an artificial lake, Lotus Lake, and forested green areas in the west and north. Lotus Hill Park is not only an important place for citizens to relax and exercise, but also an excellent choice for tourists to explore the natural scenery and cultural heritage of Shenzhen.

There are numerous skyscrapers in the CBD such as the SEG Tower, the Shum Yip Up Hills Twin Towers, China Merchants Bank Tower, the twin towers of East Pacific Center, and the 599 m (1969 ft) Ping An Finance Centre, which is the second tallest building in China and the fifth tallest in the world.

Wal-Mart China has its headquarters in Towers 2 and 3 of SZITIC Square (Note: 深国投广场; 深國投廣場; Shēnguótóu Guǎngchǎng; sam1 gwok3 tau4 gwong2 coeng4) in Futian District.

The headquarters of OnePlus is in the Tairan Building (Note: 泰然大厦; 泰然大廈; Tàirán Dàshà; taai3 jin4 daai6 haa6) in Chegongmiao, (Note: 车公庙; 車公廟; Chēgōngmiào; ce1 gung1 miu6) Futian District.

Everbright International has its Shenzhen Offices in Oriental Xintiandi Plaza (Note: 东方新天地广场; 東方新天地廣場; Dōngfāng Xīntiāndì Guǎngchǎng; dung1 fong1 san1 tin1 dei6 gwong2 coeng4) in Futian District.

The hotel chain Vienna Hotels formerly had its headquarters in Lüjing Garden, (Note: 绿景花园; 綠景花園; Lǜjǐng Huāyuán; luk6 ging2 faa1 jyun4*2) Futian District.

Ping An Finance Group and China Merchants Bank both placed their corporate headquarters in the Futian District.

== Subdistricts ==
Name	Chinese (S)	Hanyu Pinyin	Canton Romanization	Population (2010)	Area (km^{2})
Shatou Subdistrict	沙头街道	Shātóu Jiēdào	sa1 teo4 gai1 dou6	226,061	18.90
Nanyuan Subdistrict	南园街道	Nányuán Jiēdào	nam4 yun4 gai1 dou6	108,398	3.00
Yuanling Subdistrict	园岭街道	Yuánlǐng Jiēdào	yun4 léng5 gai1 dou6	88,261	3.67
Huafu Subdistrict	华富街道	Huáfù Jiēdào	wa4 fu3 gai1 dou6	70,834	5.75
Futian Subdistrict	福田街道	Fútián Jiēdào	fug1 tin4 gai1 dou6	234,861	12.25
Xiangmihu Subdistrict	香蜜湖街道	Xiāngmìhú Jiēdào	hêng1 med6 wu4 gai1 dou6	89,471	9.98
Lianhua Subdistrict	莲花街道	Liánhuā Jiēdào	lin4 fa1 gai1 dou6	168,392	9.60
Meilin Subdistrict	梅林街道	Méilín Jiēdào	mui4 lem4 gai1 dou6	168,506	34.30
Huaqiangbei Subdistrict	华强北街道	Huáqiángběi Jiēdào	wa4 kêng4 beg1 gai1 dou6	54,067	2.90
Fubao Subdistrict	福保街道	Fúbǎo Jiēdào	fug1 bou2 gai1 dou6	106,811	3.75

== Transport ==
=== Shenzhen Metro ===
Futian is currently served by ten metro lines operated by Shenzhen Metro. These lines and their stations and connections are:

- Line 1 – Science Museum 6, Huaqiang Road, Gangxia 10, Convention and Exhibition Center 4, Shopping Park 3, Xiangmihu, Chegongmiao 7 9 11, Zhuzilin, Qiaocheng East
- Line 2 – Shenkang, Antuo Hill 7, Qiaoxiang, Xiangmi, Xiangmei North, Jingtian 9, Lianhua West, Futian 3 11, Civic Center 4, Gangxia North 10 11 14, Huaqiang North 7, Yannan
- Line 3 – Futian Bonded Area, Yitian, Shixia 7, Shopping Park 1, Futian 2 11, Children's Palace 4, Lianhuacun 10, Huaxin 7, Tongxinling 6, Hongling 9
- Line 4 – Futian Checkpoint 10 ( via Lok Ma Chau), Fumin 7 10, Convention and Exhibition Center 1, Civic Center 2, Children's Palace 3, Lianhua North, Shangmeilin 9
- Line 6 – Science Museum 1, Tongxinling 3, Sports Center, Bagualing 7, Hanling
- Line 7 - Autuo Hill 2, Nonglin, Chegongmiao 1 9 11, Shangsha, Shawei, Shixia 3, Huanggangcun, Fumin 4 10, Huanggang Checkpoint, Chiwei, Huaqiang South, Huaqiang North 2, Huaxin 3, Huangmugang 14, Bagualing 6, Hongling North 9
- Line 9 - Xiasha, Chegongmiao 1 7 11, Xiangmei, Jingtian 2, Meijing, Xiameilin, Meicun, Shangmeilin 4, Maling 10, Hongling North 7, Yuanling, Hongling 3, Hongling South
- Line 10 – Futian Checkpoint 4 ( via Lok Ma Chau), Fumin 4 7, Gangxia 1, Gangxia North 2 11 14, Lianhuacun 3, Donggualing, Maling 9
- Line 11 – Chegongmiao 1 7 9 , Futian 2 3, Gangxia North 2 10 14
- Line 14 – Gangxia North 2 10 11, Huangmugang 7

=== High-speed railway ===
Futian is currently served by the Futian Railway station, with the high-speed rail from Guangzhou to Hong Kong.

== Shopping centers ==
Central Walk Shopping Mall (Note: 中心城; Zhōngxīn Chéng; zung1 sam1 sing4; 'Center City')

The mall is located at the Convention and Exhibition Center metro station and features three levels of shopping, entertainment, and dining.

COCO Park

COCO Park is an upscale retail complex in Futian Central Business District. Aside from a shopping mall, it also features a popular street bar, large open public spaces, and restaurants.

Huaqiangbei

Huaqiangbei is known for its electronics market, the largest of its kind in China. It also offers a variety of men's and women's fashions, shoes, bags and leather goods.

== Education ==
There are now 83 schools delivering primary and secondary education, holding 111,982 students and 11,503 teaching staff. Futian is also home to 140 kindergartens.

=== Secondary schools ===
Secondary schools include those operated by the Shenzhen municipal government and by the Futian district government.

Schools operated by the Shenzhen municipal government in Futian District include:

- Shenzhen Senior High School - Central Campus (中心校区) and the South Campus (南校区)
- Shenzhen Experimental School
- Shenzhen Foreign Languages School Junior High School Division
- Shenzhen No. 3 Senior High School (深圳市第三高级中学) Junior High School Division
- Shenzhen Arts School (深圳艺术学校) - Baishaling
- The First Vocational Technical School of Shenzhen (深圳市第一职业技术学校)
- Shenzhen Pengcheng Technical College (深圳鹏城技师学院), previously Shenzhen Second Senior Technical School - Fuqiang and Qiaocheng campuses

Schools operated by the Futian District government include:

- Shenzhen Futian High School (Note: 福田中学; 福田中學; Fútián Zhōngxué; fuk1 tin4 zung1 hok6) - In 2018 it had about 2,600 students. It has a 40,000 m^{2} (430,000 sq ft) campus.
- Shenzhen Fujing Foreign Language School (Note: 福景外国语学校; 福景外國語學校; Fújǐng Wàiguóyǔ Xuéxiào; fuk1 ging2 ngoi6 gwok3 jyu5 hok6 haau6) - It was created in April 1999, and in 2018 it had over 2,000 students.
- Shenzhen Futian BeiHuan Middle School (Note: 北环中学; 北環中學; Běihuán Zhōngxué; bak1 waan4 zung1 hok6)
- Futian Foreign Languages High School (Note: 福田区外国语高级中学; 福田區外國語高級中學; Fútiánqū Wàiguóyǔ Gāojízhōngxué; fuk1 tin4 keoi1 ngoi6 gwok3 jyu5 gou1 kap1 zung1 hok6)
- Hongling Middle School
- Shenzhen Futian Huafu Middle School (Note: 华富中学; 華富中學; Huáfù Zhōngxué; waa4 fu3 zung1 hok6)
- Shenzhen Futian Huanggang Middle School (Note: 皇岗中学; 皇崗中學; Huánggǎng Zhōngxué; wong4 gong1 zung1 hok6)
- Shenzhen Futian Lianhua Middle School (Note: 莲花中学; 蓮花中學; Liánhuā Zhōngxué; lin4 faa1 zung1 hok6)
- Shenzhen Futian Meilin Middle School
- Shenzhen Futian Meishan Middle School (Note: 梅山中学; 梅山中學; Méishān Zhōngxué; mui4 saan1 zung1 hok6)
- Shenzhen Futian Science Middle School (Note: 科技中学; 科技中學; Kējì Zhōngxué; fo1 gei6 zung1 hok6)
- Shenzhen Futian Shangbu Middle School (Note: 上步中学; 上步中學; Shàngbù Zhōngxué; soeng5 bou6 zung1 hok6)
- Shenzhen Futian Shangsha Middle School (Note: 上沙中学; 上沙中學; Shàngshā Zhōngxué; soeng5 saa1 zung1 hok6)
- Shenzhen Futian Xinzhou Middle School (Note: 新洲中学; 新洲中學; Xīnzhōu Zhōngxué; san1 zau1 zung1 hok6)
- Shenzhen Yongyuan Experimental School

Other:

- Xinsha Middle School

=== International schools ===
- Green Oasis School

QSI International School of Shenzhen previously had a campus in Honeylake, Futian District, adjacent to the Shenzhen Celebrities Club.

=== Higher education ===
Futian District is the location of the University of Hong Kong–Shenzhen Hospital, a municipally-funded public teaching hospital.

== Immigration port of entry ==
One of the immigration control points that lies within Futian is known as the Futian Port. Its counterpart in Hong Kong is Lok Ma Chau Spur Line Control Point, connected through a pedestrian bridge. The port is served by Futian Checkpoint Station on the Shenzhen Metro, itself being located within the port building.

Another immigration checkpoint is located 150 m east of Futian Port. This is the only one of the six immigration checkpoints between Shenzhen and Hong Kong that is open 24 hours. The crossing is highway-only and used mostly by trucks and buses, with the mainland and Hong Kong crossings being on opposite sides of a bridge over the Shenzhen River. Its counterpart in Hong Kong is Lok Ma Chau Control Point. It also marks the terminus of the G4 Beijing–Hong Kong and Macau Expressway.

== Gallery ==
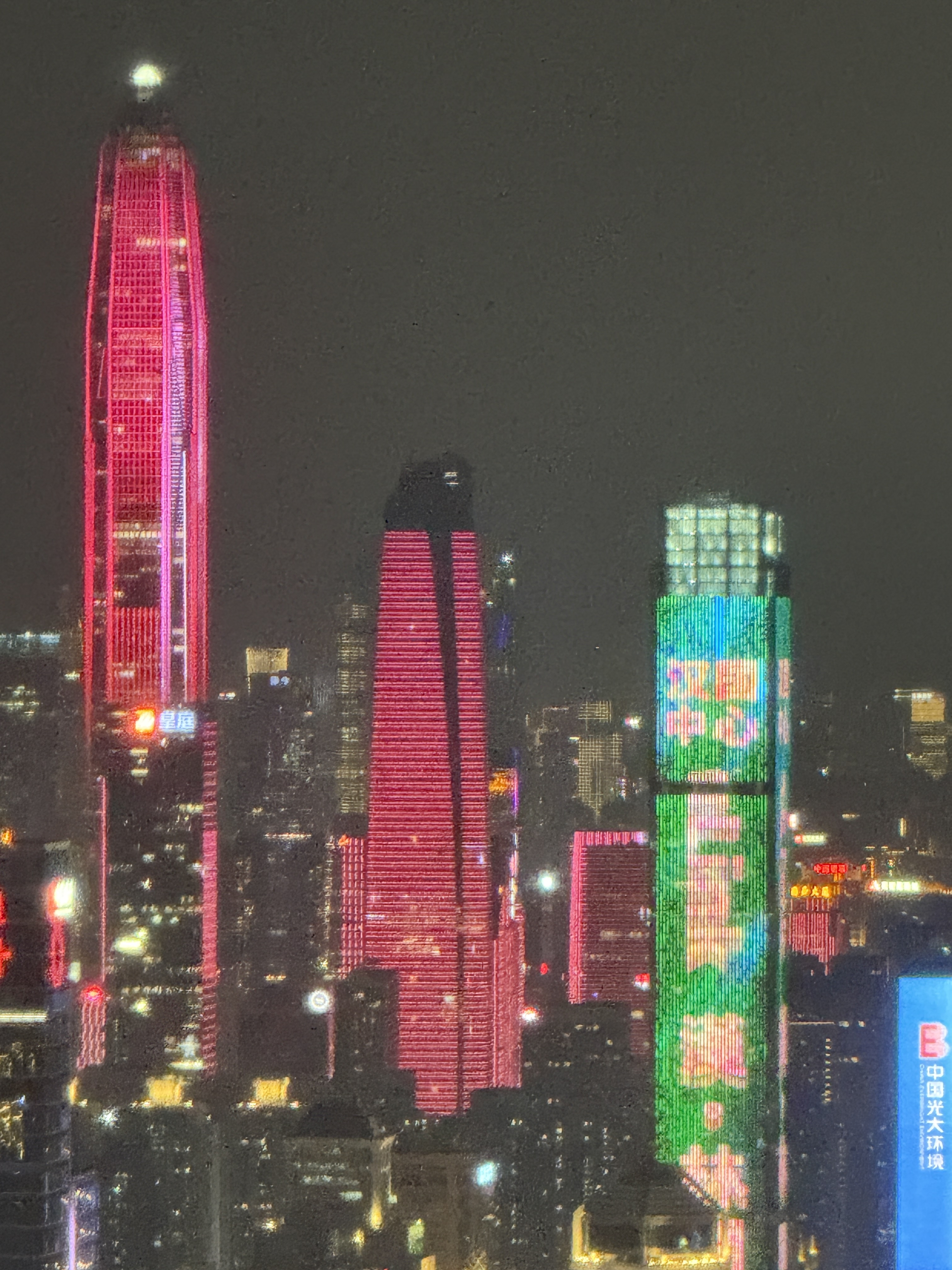
Ping An Finance Centre and Dabaihui Plaza from Shenzhen regular light show in 2026

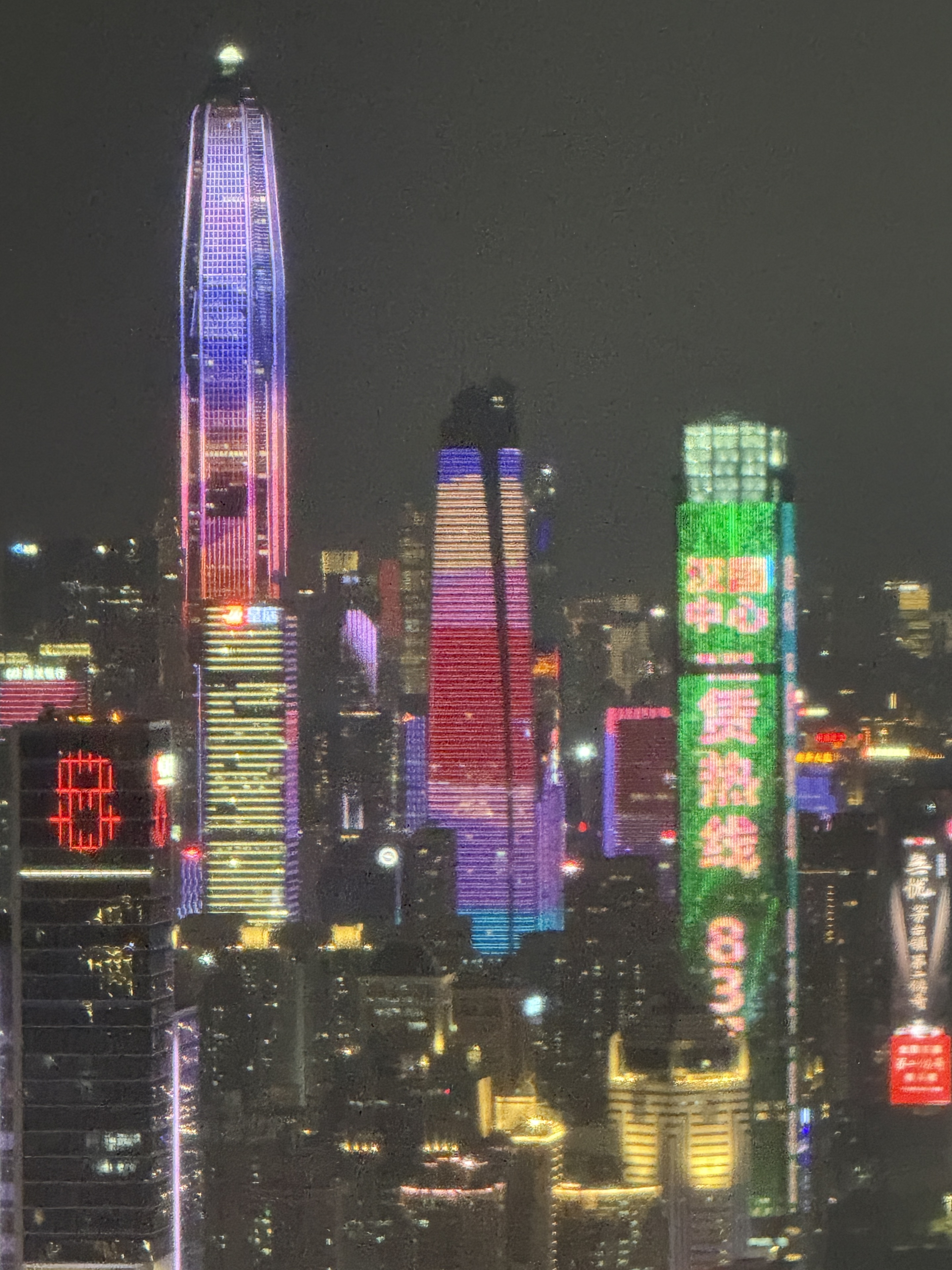
Ping An Finance Centre and Dabaihui Plaza in 2026

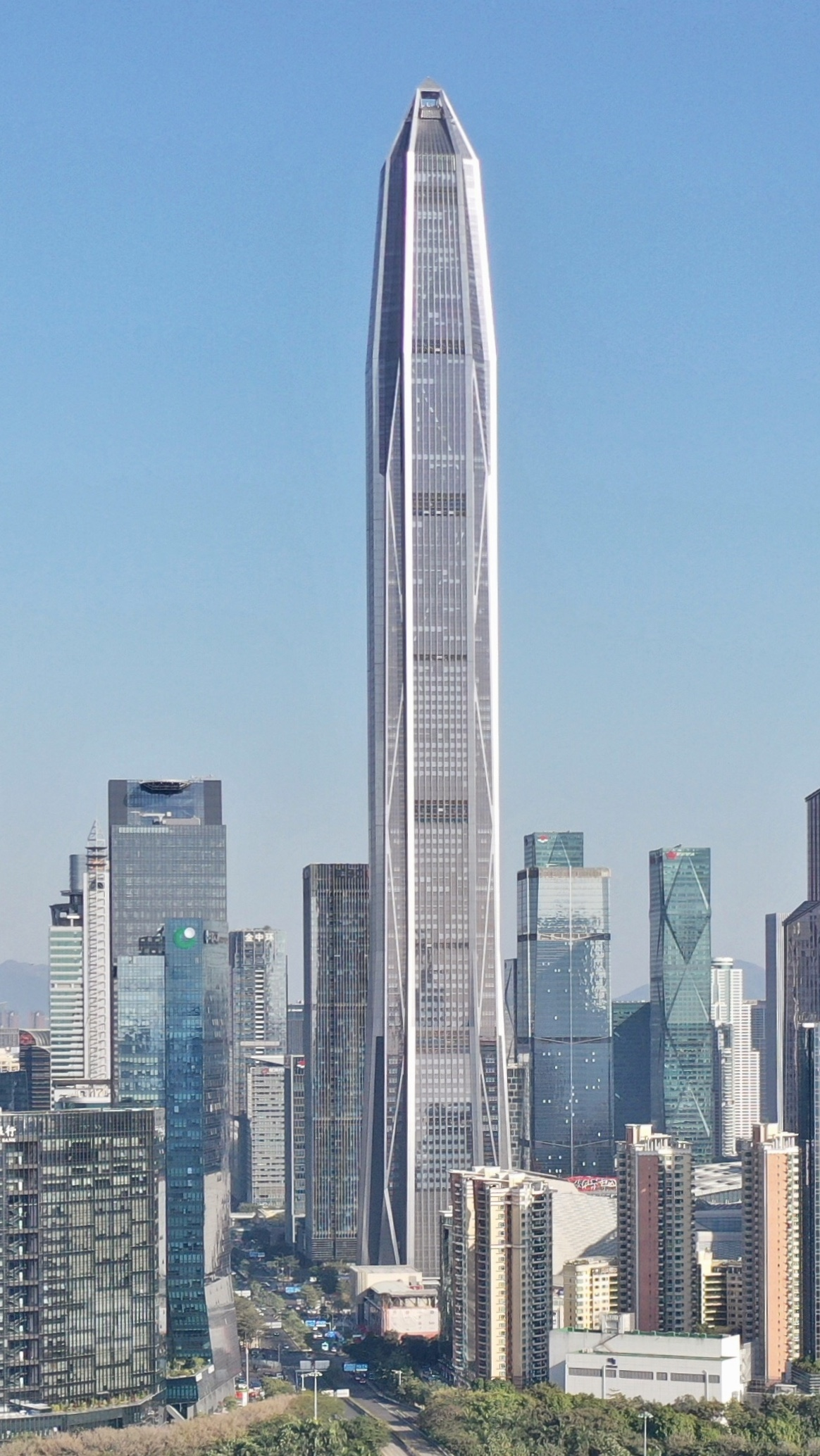
Ping An Finance Centre in 2020

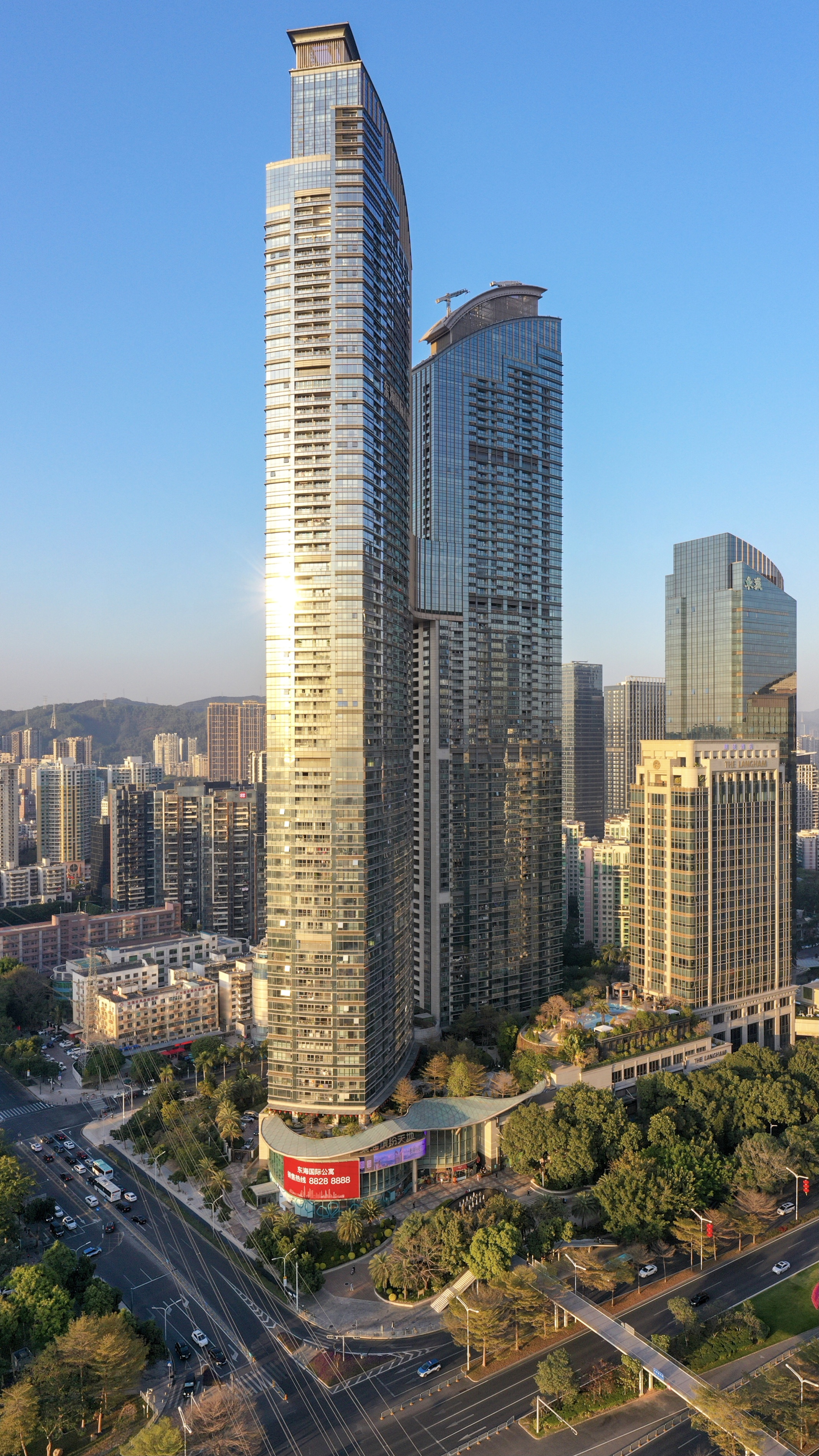
East Pacific Business Center in 2021

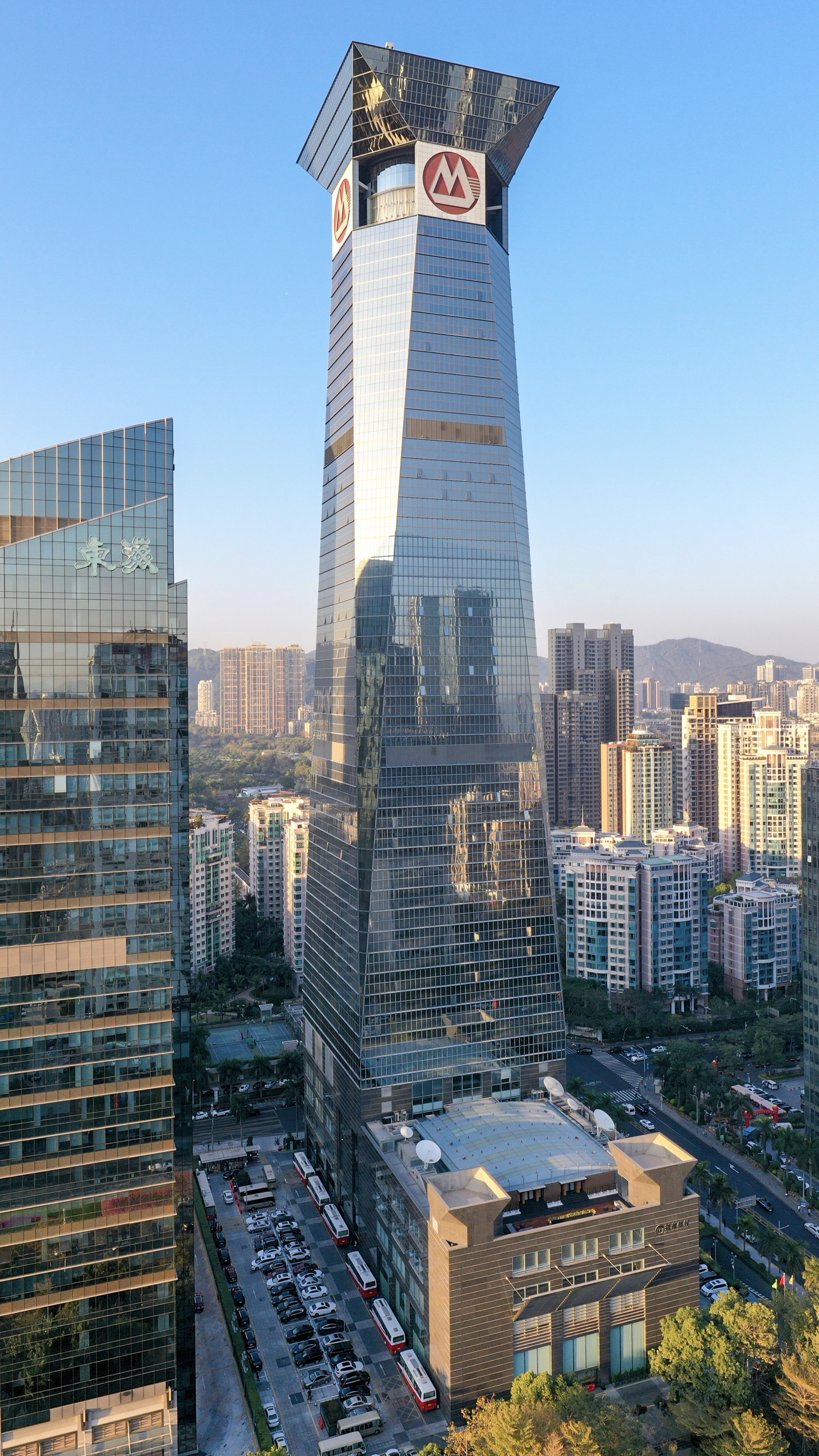
China Merchants Bank Tower in 2021

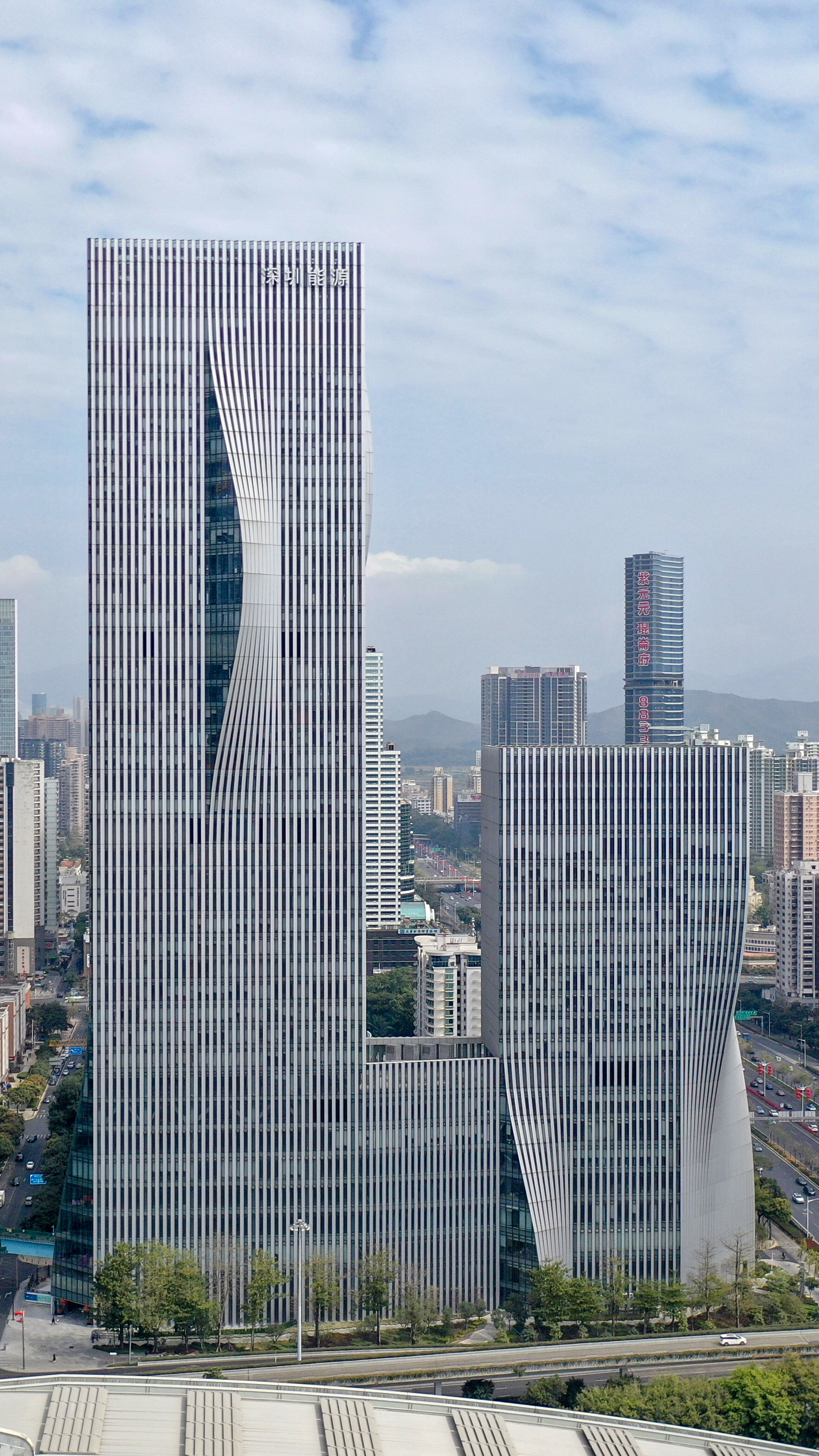
Shenzhen Energy Headquarters in 2021

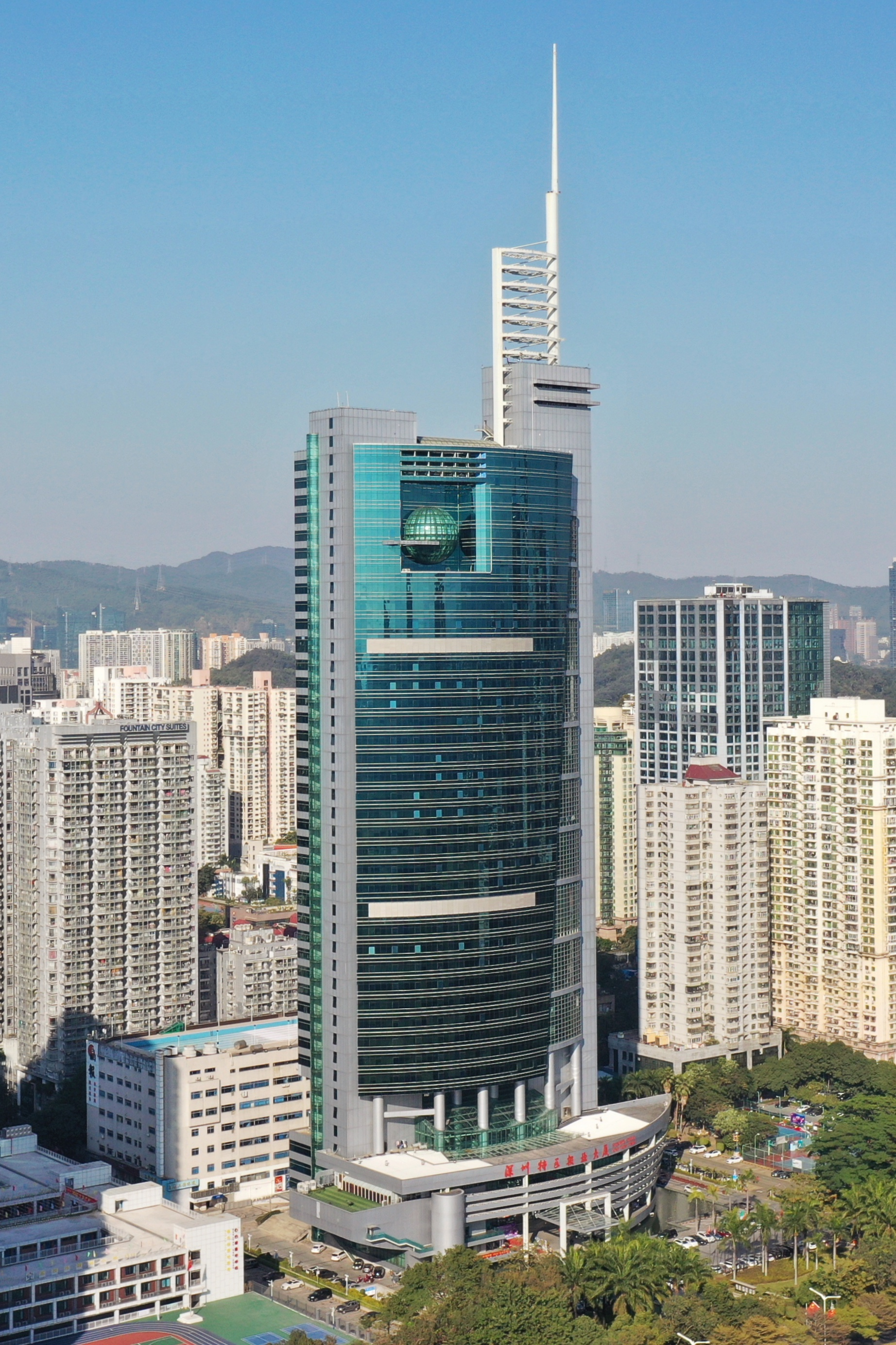
Shenzhen Special Zone Press Tower in 2020

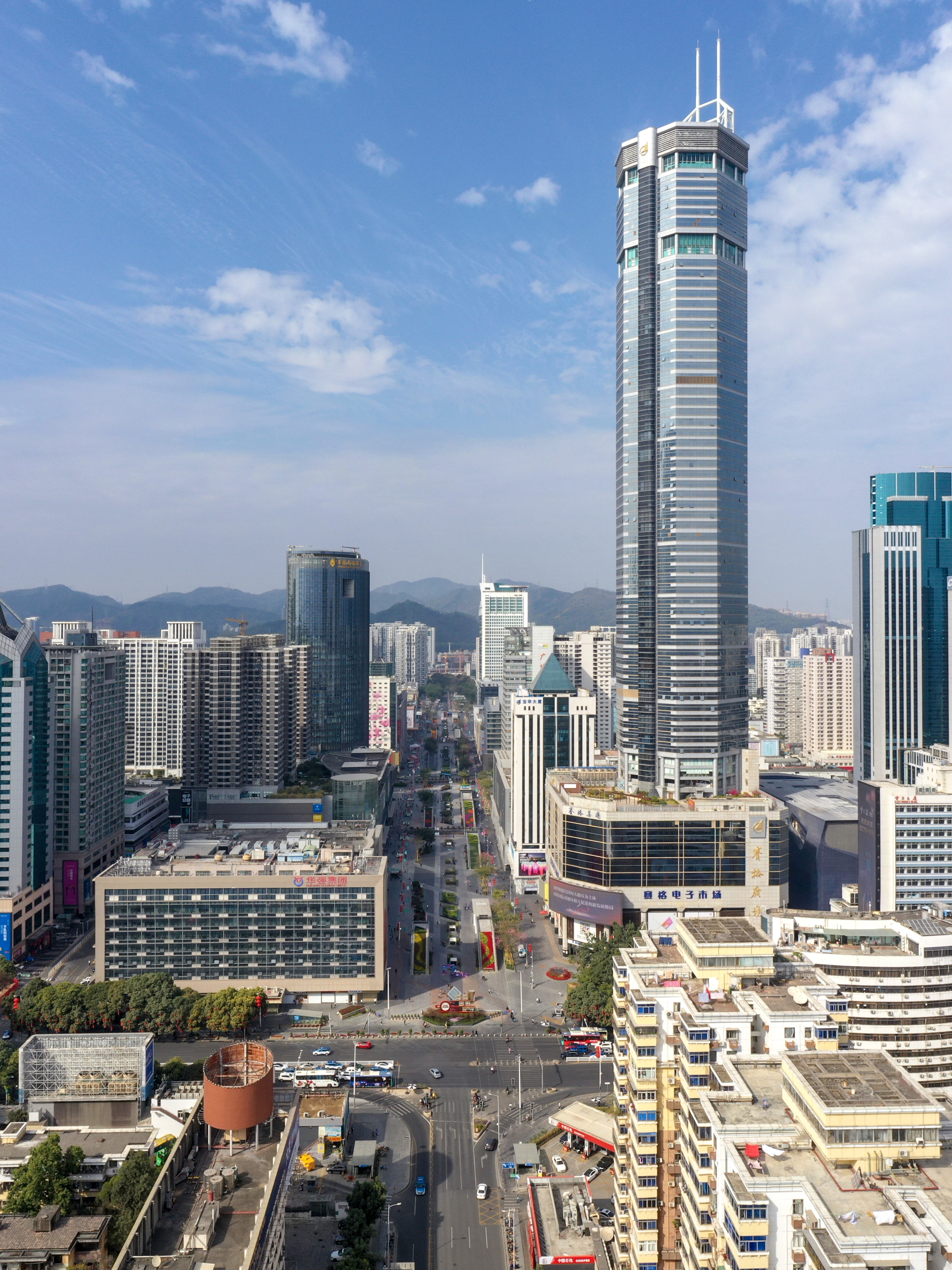
Huaqiangbei & Shennan Road Cross with SEG Plaza in 2021

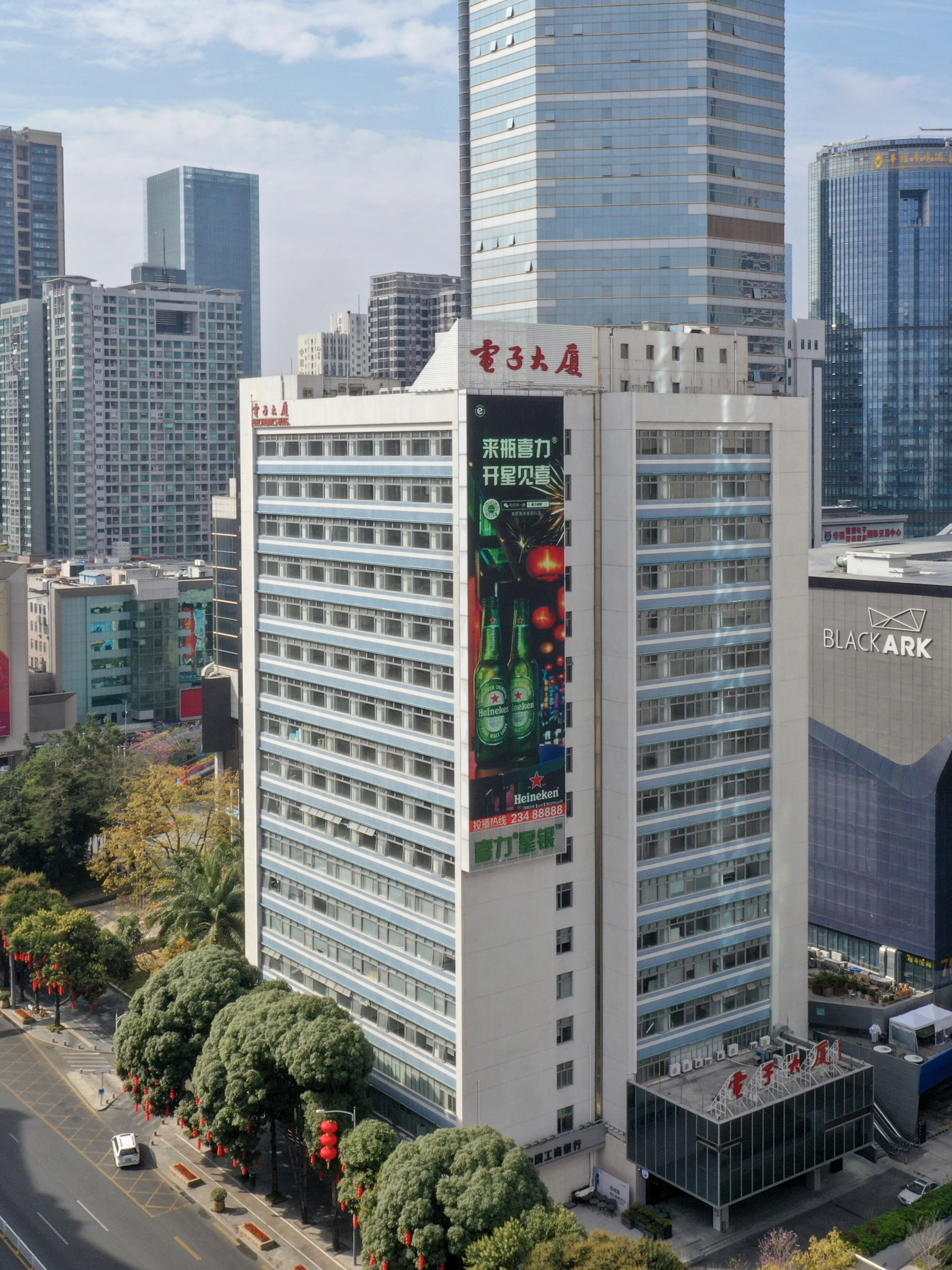
CEIEC Building in 2021

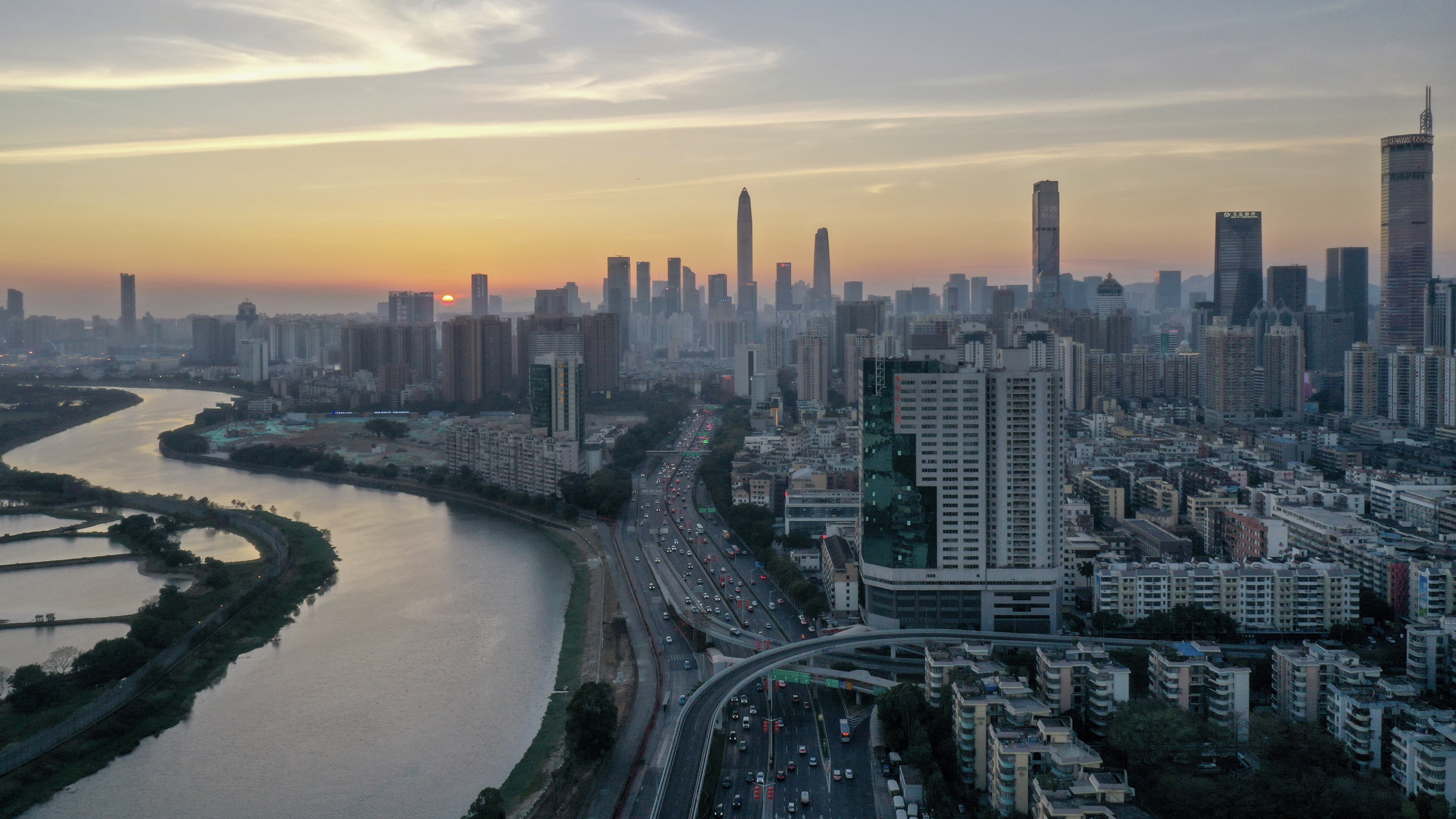
Skyline of Futian CBD as viewed from Binhe Boulevard

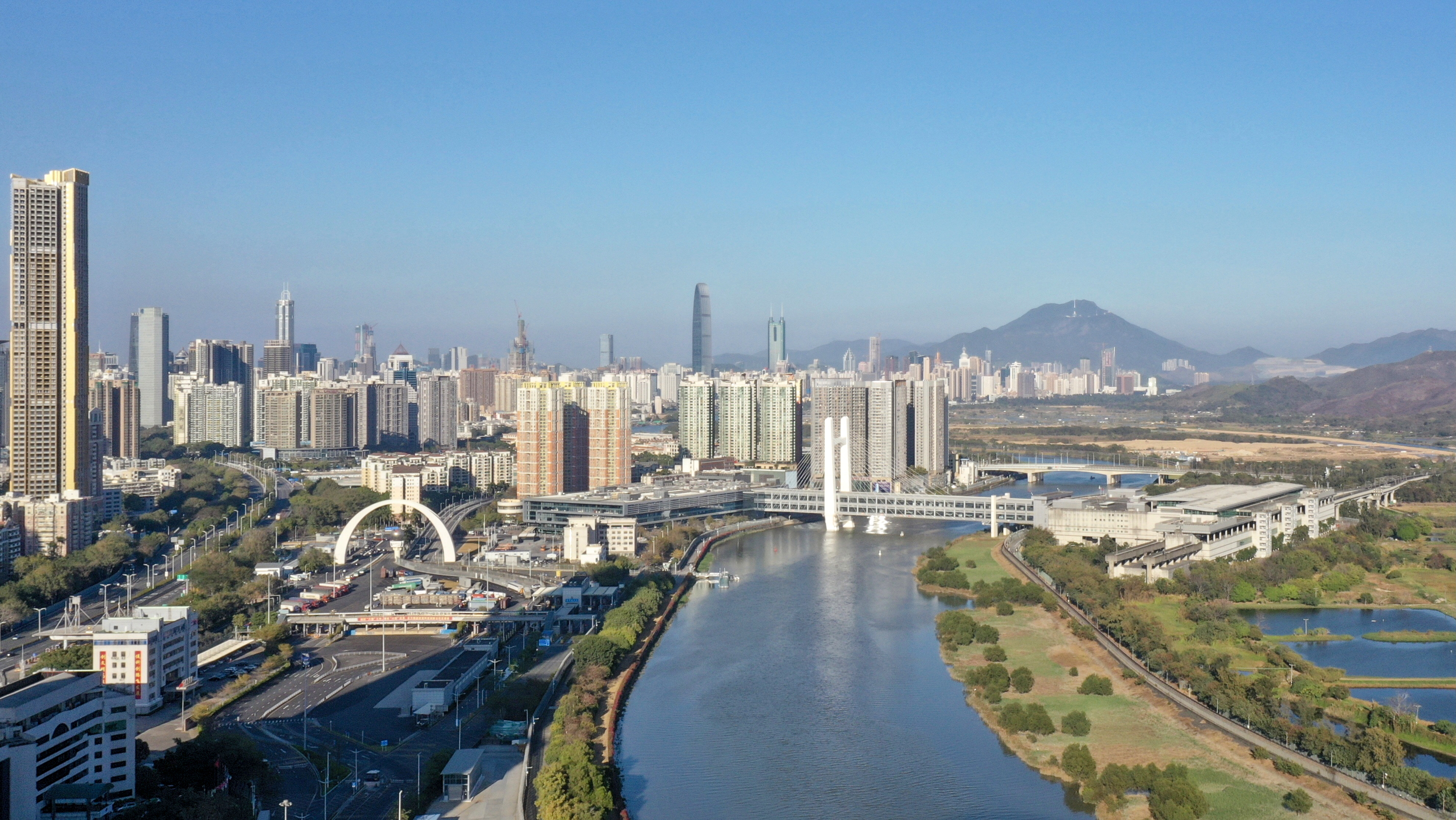
Shenzhen River between Futian & Lok Ma Chau in 2021

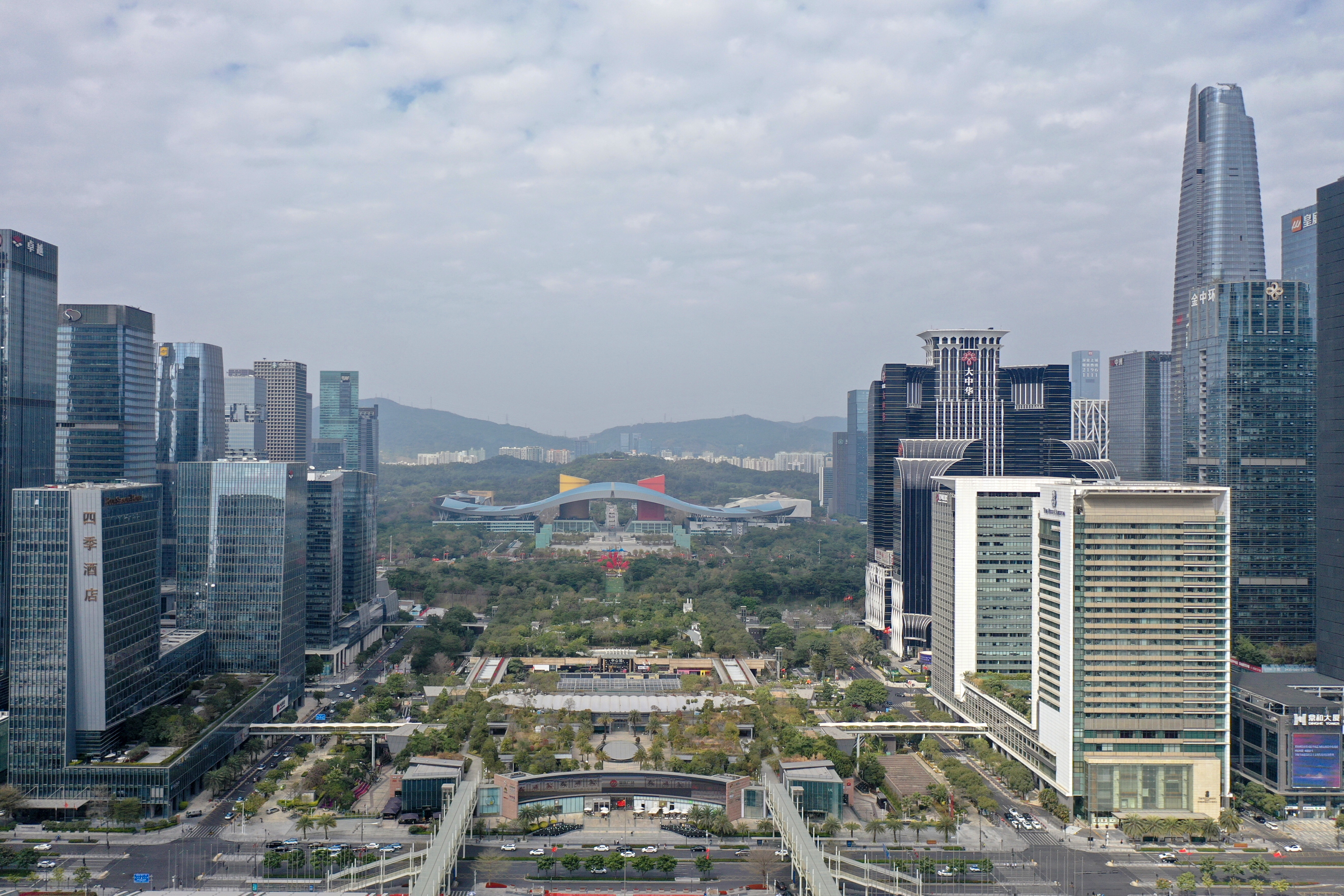
Shenzhen Civic Center

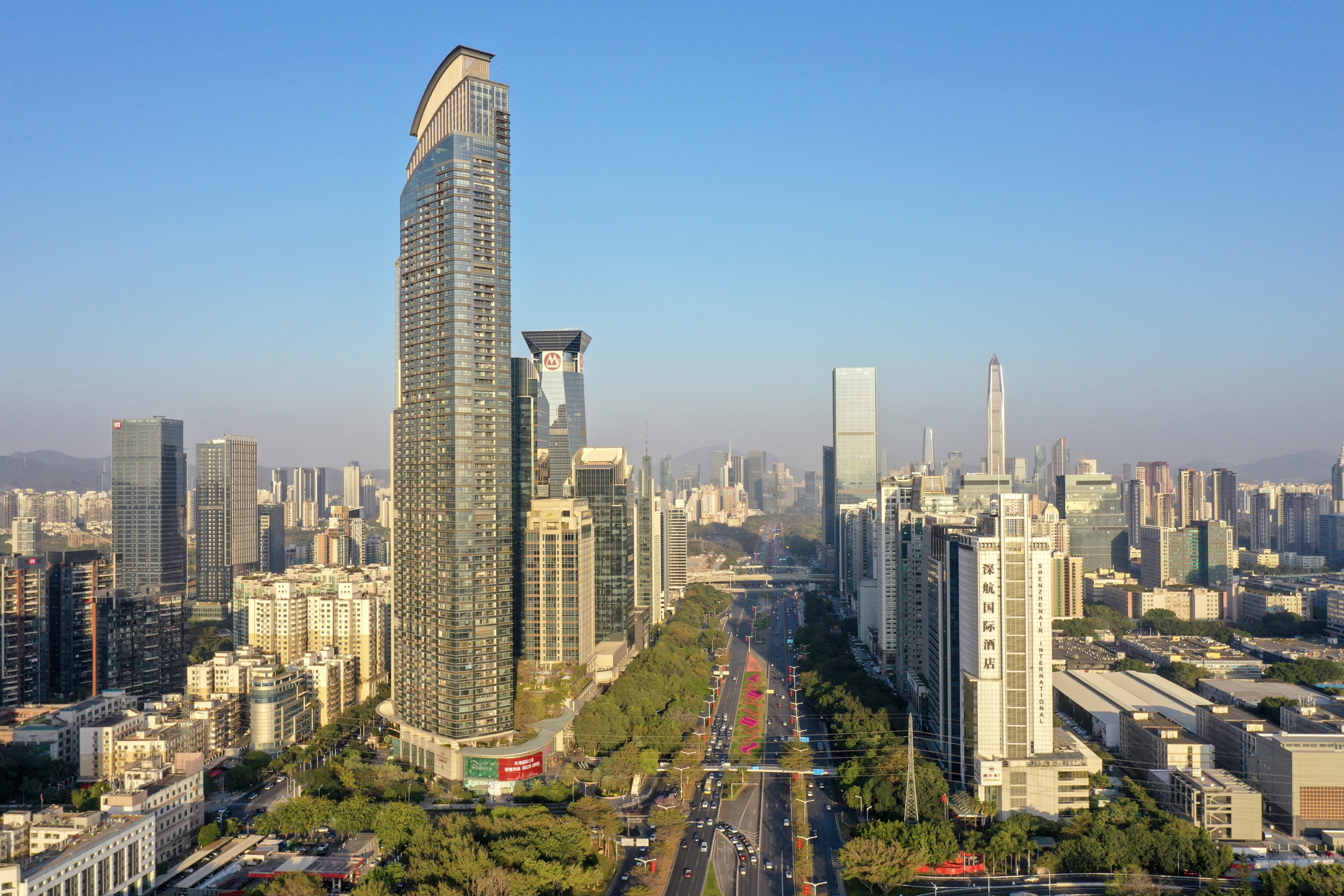
Shennan Road with Zhuzilin Junction East in 2021

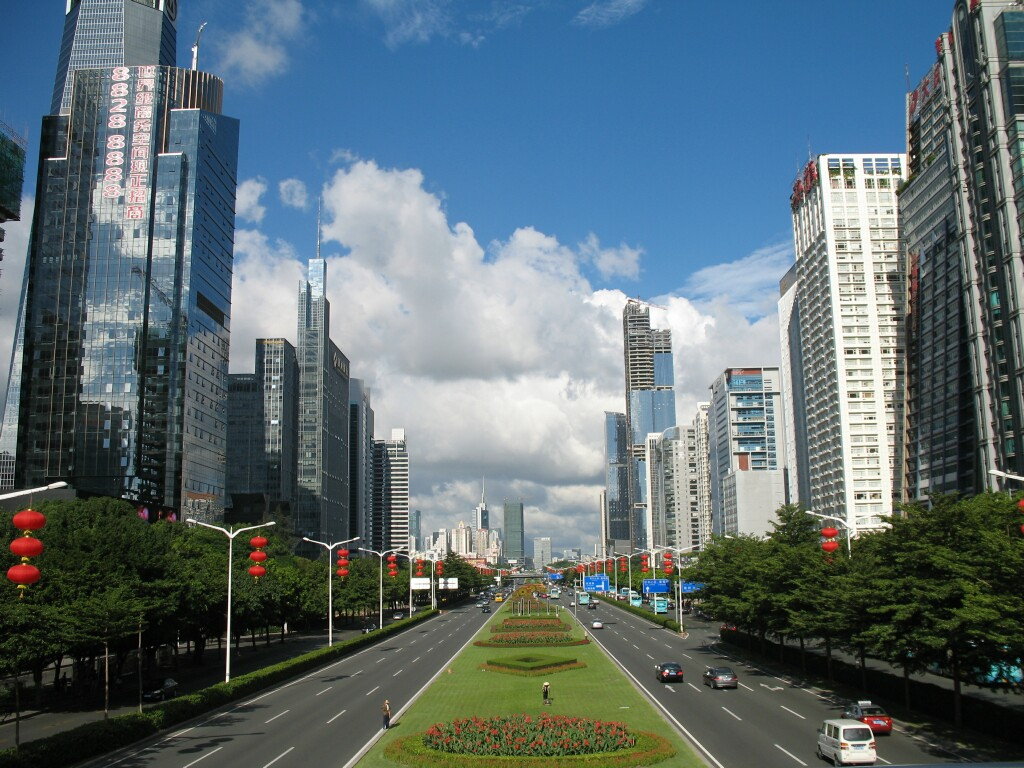
Futian section of Shennan Road

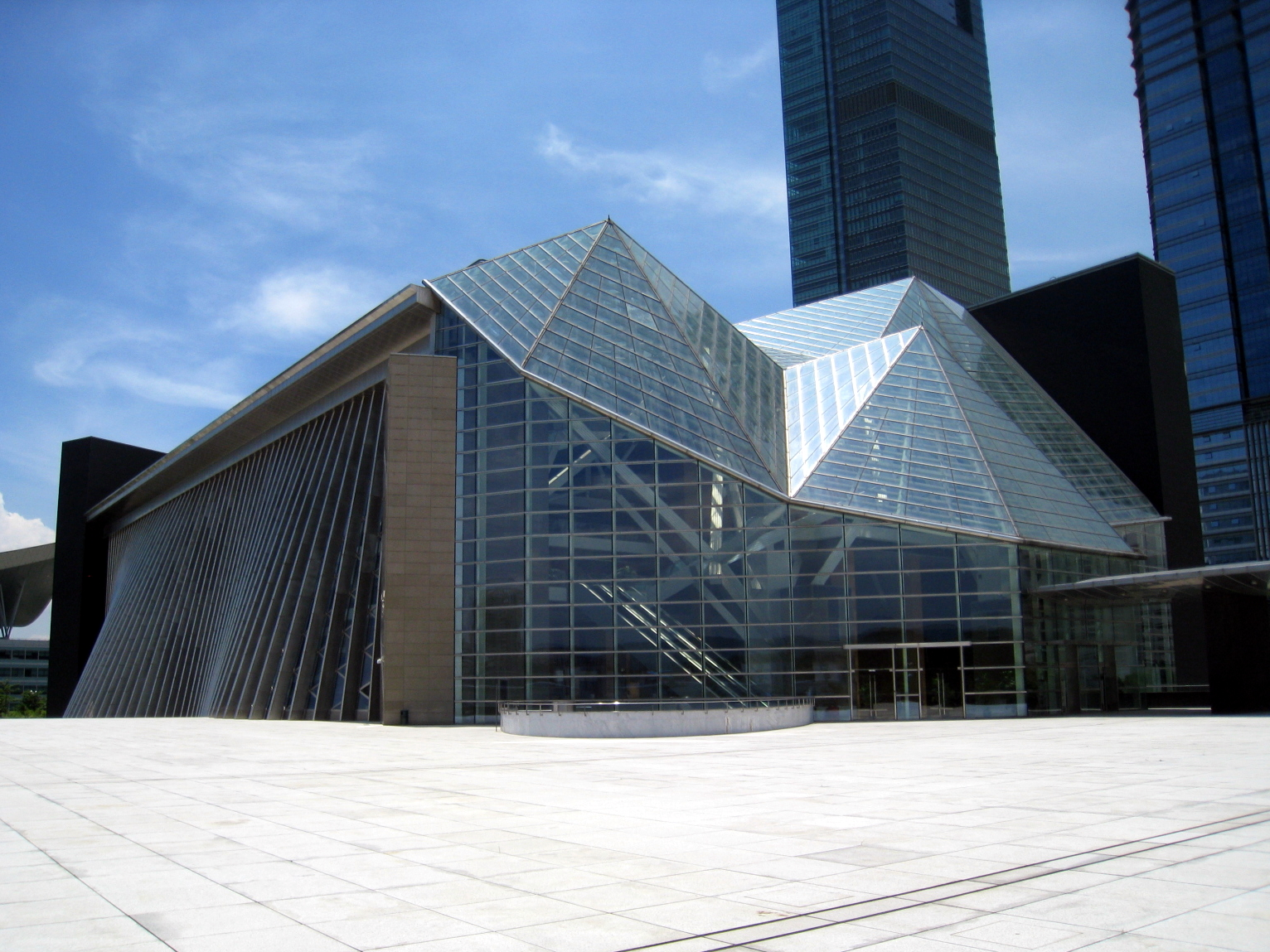
Shenzhen Library

== See also ==
- Futian station
- Jupiter Museum of Art, a contemporary art museum
- Yuanwang digital mall
