= Binhe Boulevard =

Street in Shenzhen, China

- Native name: 滨河大道 (Chinese)
- West end: Binhai Boulevard
- East end: Chuanbu Street

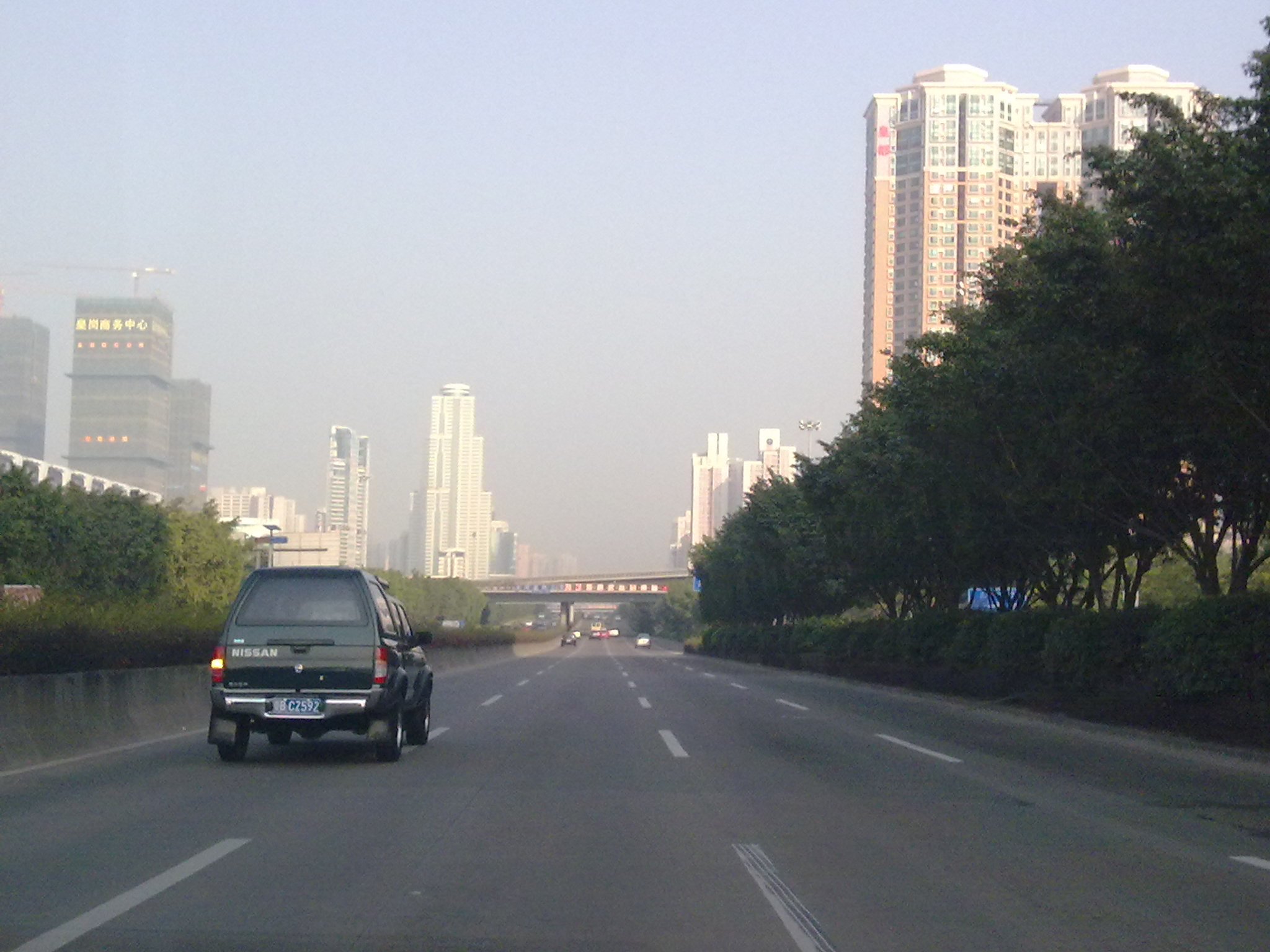
Binhe Boulevard in 2009

Binhe Boulevard (Chinese: 滨河大道; Jyutping: ban1 ho4 daai6 dou6; lit. 'Riverside Boulevard') is a major east–west expressway along the southern boundary of Shenzhen, Guangdong, China. It connects Binhai Boulevard in the west, crosses Futian and ends at Chuanbu Street, Luohu. The speed limit is 60 kilometres per hour (37 mph).
