= Yuanwang digital mall =

Coordinates: 22.5451°N 114.0877°E

- 远望数码商城
- Location: Futian District, Shenzhen
- Address: 中国广东省深圳市福田区华强北路1002号
- Floor area: 30,000 square meters
- Public transit: Huaqianglu Station

Yuanwang Digital Mall (Chinese: 远望数码商城; pinyin: yuǎnwàng shùmǎ shāngchéng) is a large trade center in Huaqiangbei. It runs from Shennan Boulevard at SEG Plaza near Huaqianglu Station on the Shenzhen Metro for 1 kilometre (0.62 mi) north to the Pavilion Hotel. It is the spine of a concentrated mobile, tablet, and accessories shopping area.

The scope of the mall's business includes electronic and communication products retail and wholesale, electronic components, sales agents, e-commerce, investment and development, real estate development, musical instruments operations, market management, and so on.

Yuanwang Digital Mall, a subsidiary of Pangyuan Group, is located in the heart of Huaqiang North Section, Shenzhen, with a business area of 30,000 square meters. It won the honour of being the world's largest "one-stop" cellphone and digital products procurement center, attracting more than 60% of the bulk purchases from customers around the country. The business also expands into Hong Kong and Macao. More than 50 countries and regions around the world have been its customers. There are more than ten thousand direct employees, and the average daily flow of customers is more than a hundred thousand, with a daily trading volume of over one thousand million. Yuangwang Digital Mall encapsulates almost all brands of cell phones, digital products, and accessories. It has taken the shape of a Marine Carrier digital mall, with priority given to services, scaling, management, e-commerce capacity and partnership contacts.
