= SEG Plaza =

Skyscraper in Shenzhen, Guangdong, China

- 赛格广场
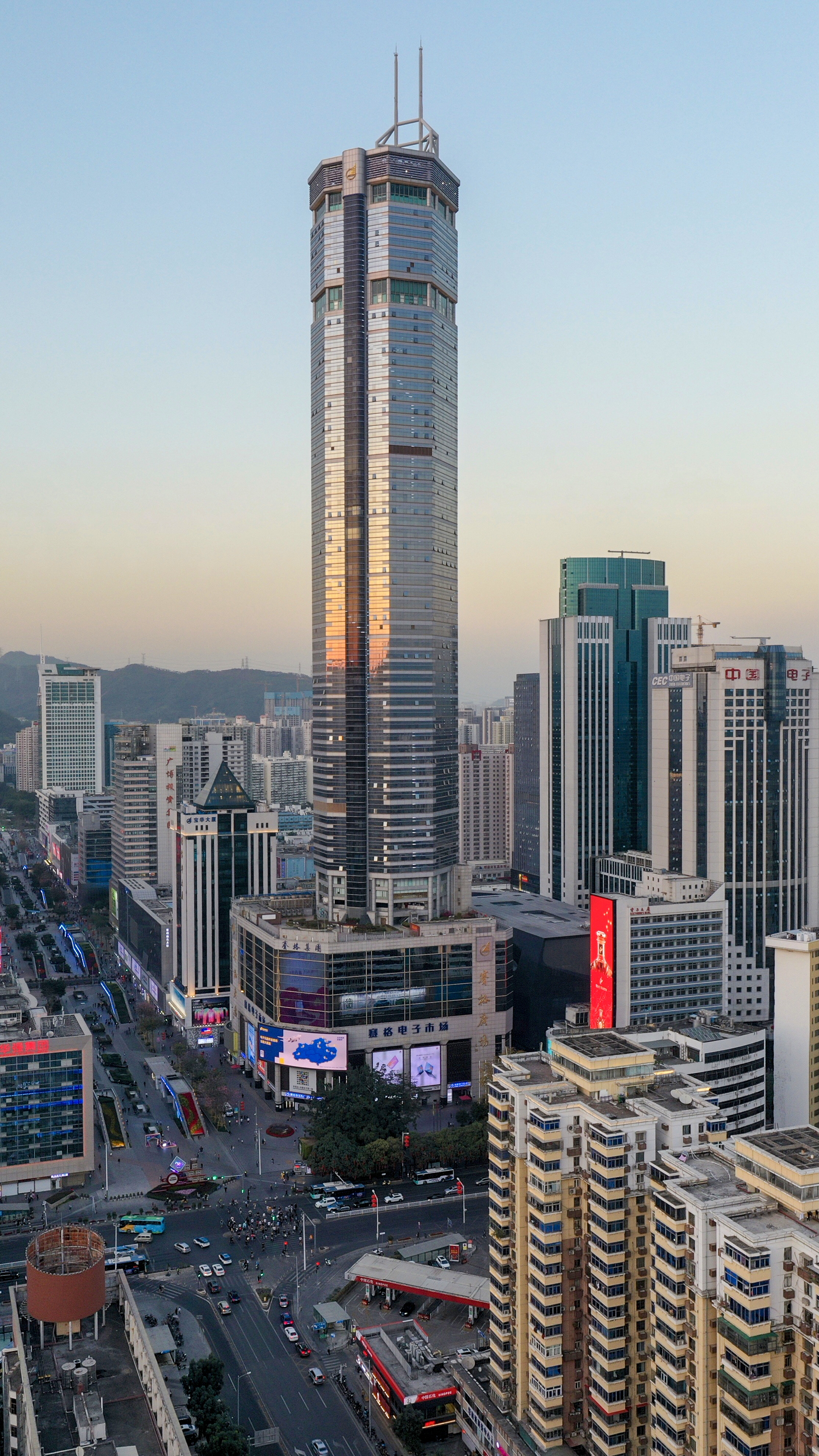
- The SEG Plaza in February 2021
- Interactive map of the SEG Plaza area

General information
- Status: Completed
- Type: Hotel / Office
- Location: 82 Shennan Middle Road, Futian District, Shenzhen, Guangdong, China
- Coordinates: 22°32′37″N 114°04′52″E
- Construction started: 1997
- Completed: 2000

Height
- Architectural: 291.6 m (957 ft)
- Antenna spire: formerly 355.8 m (1,167 ft)
- Roof: 291.6 m (957 ft)
- Top floor: 72/F

Technical details
- Floor count: 71 (+4 basement floors)
- Floor area: 169,083 m^{2} (1,819,990 sq ft)

Design and construction
- Architect: Hua Yi Designing Consultants

SEG Plaza (Chinese: 赛格广场) is a skyscraper in Shenzhen, Guangdong Province, China. Completed in 2000 and located at the junction of Shennan Road and Huaqiangbei Electronics Market, it originally stood 356 metres (1,168 ft) tall including the height of the original antenna which has since been removed. It was the 21st tallest in China and the 72nd tallest in the world. The observation floor at the 69th level used to offer views over Shenzhen and northern Hong Kong but has been converted to office space. It is the home of, and named after the Shenzhen Electronics Group (SEG). It can be reached by Huaqiang North Station and Huaqiang Road Station of the Shenzhen Metro.

== History ==
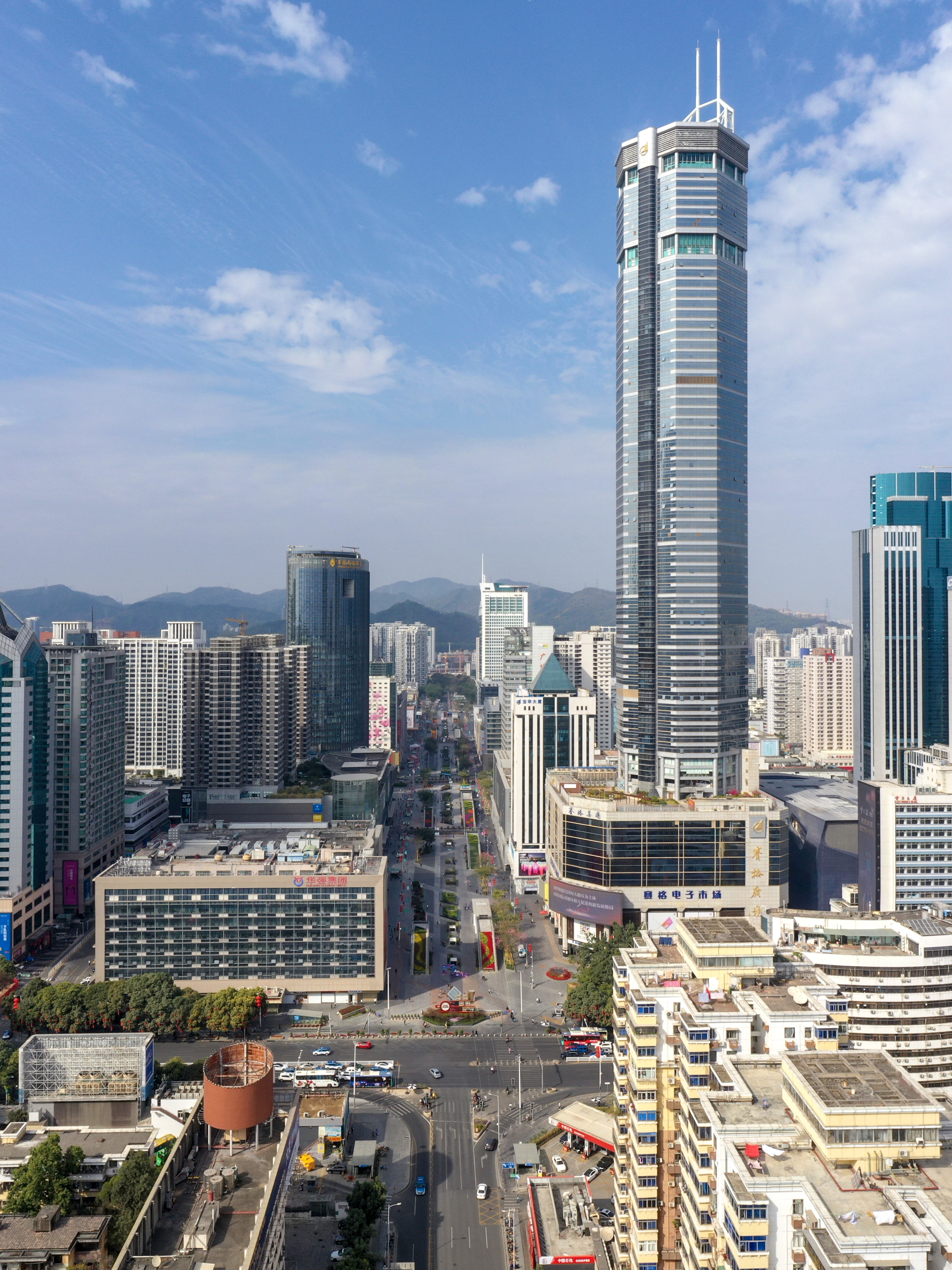
SEG Plaza with Shennan Cross in Huaqiangbei

=== Construction ===
The tower comprises a steel-reinforced concrete core with external steel tube columns filled with concrete. It has four basement levels.

It was constructed for Seg Plaza Investment and Development with investment from the Shenzhen SEG Group Co. Ltd. The tower was designed by Chinese architecture firm Hua Yi Designing Consultants Limited (Chinese: 华艺设计顾问有限公司).

=== 2021 shaking ===
On 18 May 2021, the building began to shake, leading to an emergency evacuation.

The building remained closed three days later while inspections were carried out. An initial investigation ruled out an earthquake as the cause of shaking, with the main structure of the building safe without any cracks found at the building or the surroundings.

Authorities later declared the shaking as a result of winds which caused a rooftop mast to vibrate. The mast was used for guiding aircraft and lightning protection. The mast has since been removed and replaced by an alternative structure providing the same functions. The building's exact new height is uncertain, the original mast having accounted for approximately 210 feet (64 m) of it.

== Floors ==
The roof height of the building is 292 metres (958 ft). There are a total of 71 stories above ground (72 when counting the helipad) and 4 stories underground. The total floor space is 170,000 square meters. The four stories underground are parking levels.

=== SEG Electronics Market and the main building ===
The floors from the 1st floor through to the 10th floor are taken up by the SEG Electronics Market, a major market of electronics components and finished products of international importance. The names SEG Electronics Market and SEG Market are also sometimes metonymically used for the surrounding area, including other electronics markets in nearby buildings.

The 11th floor is a refuge floor. Floor M and 12th floors are European restaurants and a food supply center for the administration. Floors 13 through 69 are white-collar worker office floors (of which floors 19, 34, 49 and 63 are emergency equipment cabinet and shelter levels); the 70th and 71st floors are observation decks (Closed) and the 72nd floor is a helicopter landing pad.

SEG Plaza's elevators are made by OTIS which can travel to 6 metres per second (1,200 ft/min).

== See also ==
- List of tallest buildings in Shenzhen
