= Tongxinling station =

Metro station in Shenzhen, China

Tongxinling 通新岭
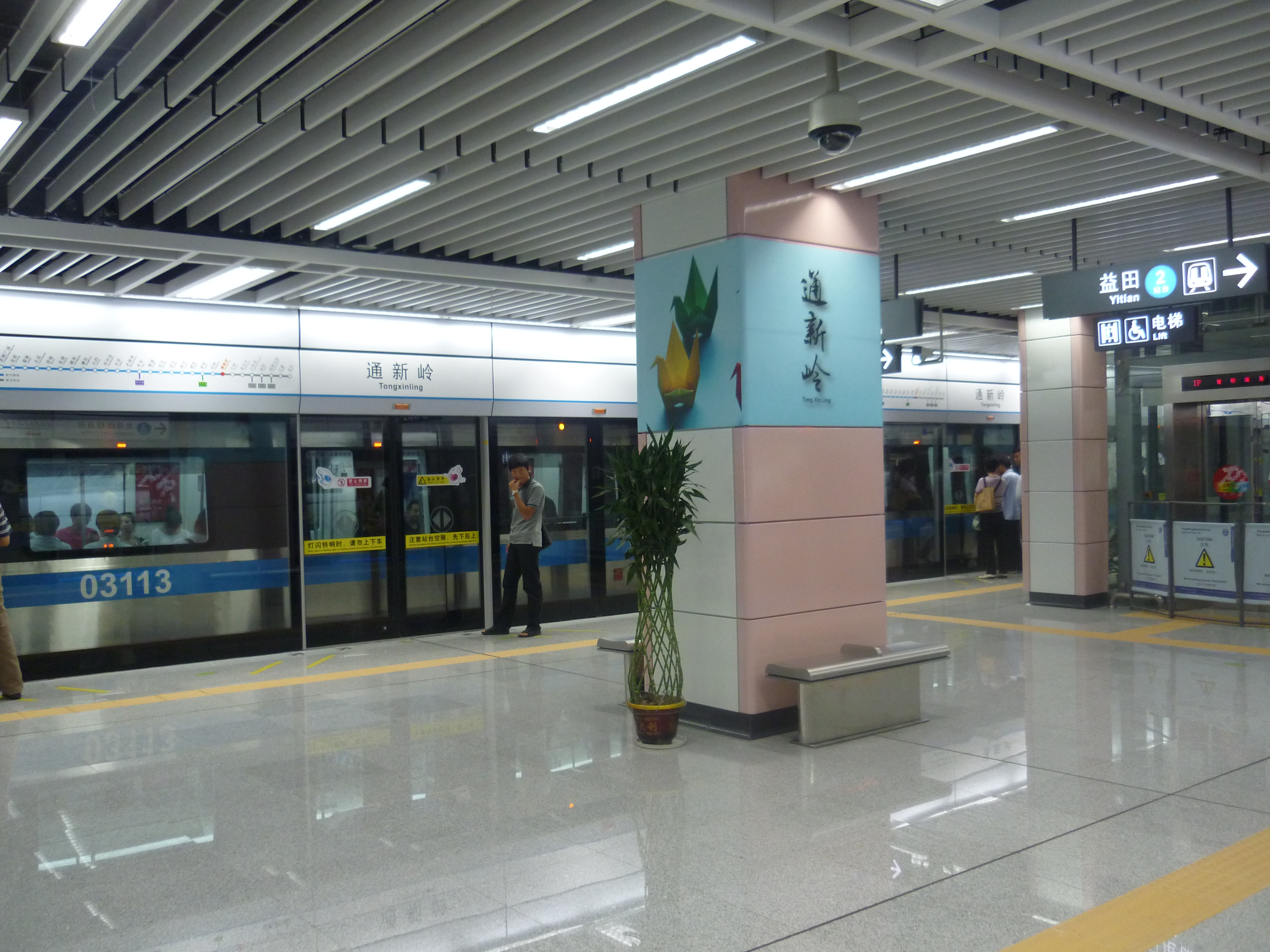
- Line 3 platform

General information
- Location: Futian District, Shenzhen, Guangdong; China
- Coordinates: 22°32′57″N 114°5′45″E
- Operated by: SZMC (Shenzhen Metro Group)
- Lines: Line 3; Line 6
- Platforms: 4 (2 island platforms)
- Tracks: 4

Construction
- Structure type: Underground
- Accessible: Yes

History
- Opened: Line 3: 28 June 2011 (14 years ago); Line 6: 18 August 2020 (5 years ago)

Services
| Preceding station | Shenzhen Metro | Following station |
|---|---|---|
| Hongling towards Pingdi Liulian | Line 3 | Huaxin towards Futian Bonded Area |
| Sports Center towards Songgang | Line 6 | Science Museum Terminus |
Location

Tongxinling station (simplified Chinese: 通新岭站; traditional Chinese: 通新嶺站; pinyin: Tōng Xīn Lǐng Zhàn; Jyutping: tung1 san1 ling5 zaam6) is a station of Line 3 and Line 6 of the Shenzhen Metro. Line 3 platforms opened on 28 June 2011 and Line 6 platforms opened on 18 August 2020.

== Station layout ==
| G | - | Exits A-F |
| B1F; Concourse | Lobby | Ticket Machines, Customer Service, Shops, Vending Machines |
| B2F; 3 Platforms | Platform | 3 towards Futian Bonded Area (Huaxin) |
| B2F; 3 Platforms | Island platform, doors will open on the left |
| B2F; 3 Platforms | Platform | 3 towards Pingdi Liulian (Hongling) |
| B3F; 6 Platforms | Platform | 6 towards Science Museum (terminus) |
| B3F; 6 Platforms | Island platform, doors will open on the left |
| B3F; 6 Platforms | Platform | 6 towards Songgang (Sports Center) |

== Exits ==
| Exit | Destination |
|---|---|
| Exit A | Hongli Road (S.), Shangbu Middie Road (W.), Shenzhen Foreign Languages Junior High School, Sichuan Building, Deep Survey Building, Shangbu Trust of Trade And Industry Building |
| Exit B | Hongli Road (S.), Shangbu Middie Road (E.), Tongde Road, LiYuan Primary School, Shenzhen Children's Library, Yuanlingcun, Tongxinling Community |
| Exit C | Hongli Road (N.), Shangbu Middle Road (E.), Yuanling West Road, Yuanling Primary School, Yuanlingxincun, Lihu Garden Building, Postal Savings Bank of China |
| Exit D | Hongli Road (N.), Shangbu Middie Road (W.), Maternity & Child Hospital, Baihua 2nd Road, Shenzhen Section of Shiyan School, Shenzhen Shiyan Middle School, Shenzhen Maternity & Child Healthcare Hospital, Yuanling Subdistrict Office, Shenzhen Gymnasium |
| Exit E1, E2 | East Side of Shangbu Middle Rd(S), South Side of Hongll Rd (E), Liyuan Primary School, Lizhi Park |
| Exit F | West Side of Shangbu Middle Rd(S), South Side of Hongll Rd(W), Shenzhen Cultural Center |
