= Huaqiang Road station =

Metro station in Shenzhen, Guangdong, China

Coordinates: 22°32′35″N 114°04′44″E

Huaqiang Rd 华强路
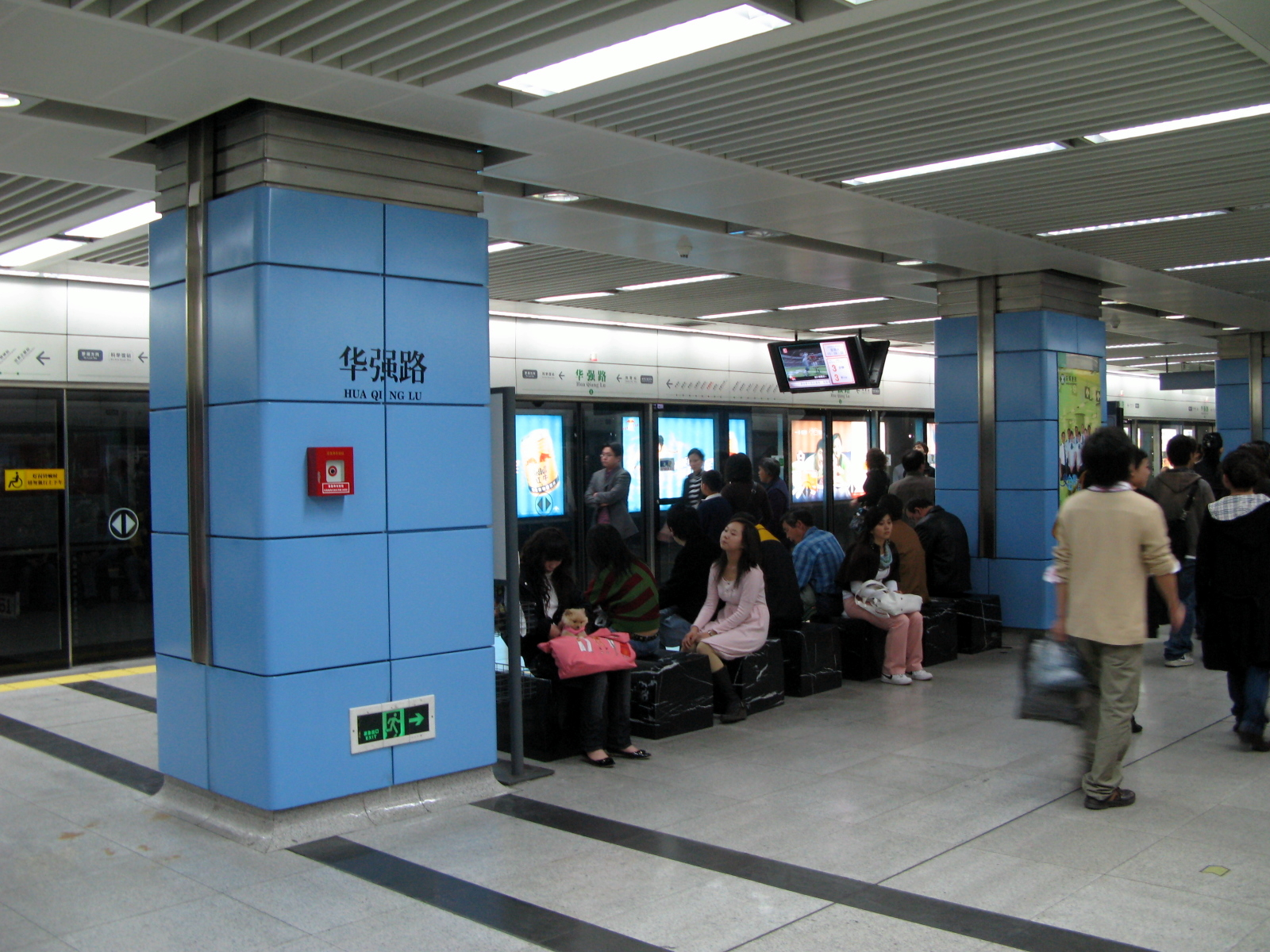

Chinese name
- Traditional Chinese: 華强路
- Simplified Chinese: 华强路
Transcriptions
Standard Mandarin
- Hanyu Pinyin: Huáqiáng Lù
Yue: Cantonese
- Jyutping: Waa4koeng4 Lou6

General information
- Location: Futian District, Shenzhen, Guangdong; China
- Operated by: SZMC (Shenzhen Metro Group)
- Line: Line 1
- Platforms: 2 (1 island platform)
- Tracks: 2
- Connections: Line 2 (Huaqiang North); Line 7 (Huaqiang North)

Construction
- Structure type: Underground
- Accessible: Yes

History
- Opened: 28 December 2004; 21 years ago
- Previous names: Huaqianglu

Passengers
- 2015: 65,999 daily
- Rank: 4th of 118

Services
Preceding station	Shenzhen Metro	Following station
Gangxia towards Airport East	Line 1	Science Museum towards Luohu
Out-of-station interchange
Gangxia North towards Chiwan	Line 2 transfer at Huaqiang North	Yannan towards Liantang
Huaqiang South towards SZU Lihu Campus	Line 7 transfer at Huaqiang North	Huaxin towards Tai'an
Location

Huaqiang Road / Rd station (simplified Chinese: 华强路站; traditional Chinese: 華強路站; Jyutping: Waa4 Koeng4 Lou6 Zaam6), formerly "Huaqianglu station", is a station on Line 1 of the Shenzhen Metro. It opened on 28 December 2004. It is located under in Shennan Middle Road (深南中路) at the junction of Huafu Road (华富路; 華富路) and Huaqiang Road (华强路; 華強路) in Futian District, Shenzhen, China. It is the third-busiest station in the network in terms of entries and exits at 49,500 passengers a day. It serves the shopping district of Huaqiangbei (华强北; 華強北).

== Station layout ==
G	-	Exit
B1F; Concourse	Lobby	Customer Service, Shops, Vending machines, ATMs
B2F; Platforms	Platform 1	← Line 1 towards Airport East (Gangxia)
B2F; Platforms	Island platform, doors will open on the left
B2F; Platforms	Platform 2	→ Line 1 towards Luohu (Science Museum) →

== Exits ==
Exit	Destination
Exit A	Shennan Boulevard (N), SEG Plaza, Huaqiang North Road, Shenzhen Women's World Shopping Plaza, Electronics & Technology Building, Huaqiang Electric World; Huaqiang North station (Exit D2)
Exit B	Shennan Boulevard (N), Zhonghang Road, Shanghai Hotel, Shenzhen Central Park, Tianmian Xincun, Shennan Rainbow Department Store
Exit C	Shennan Boulevard (S), Fuhong Road, Fuhua Road (N), Shenzhen Traditional Chinese Medicine Hospital (Shenzhen TCM Hospital), Futian Middle School, Beifang Building
Exit D	Shennan Boulevard (S), Huaqiang South Road

== See also ==
- Huaqiangbei
