= Huaqiangbei =

Coordinates: 22.54565°N 114.08700°E

Huaqiangbei 华强北
- Subdistrict
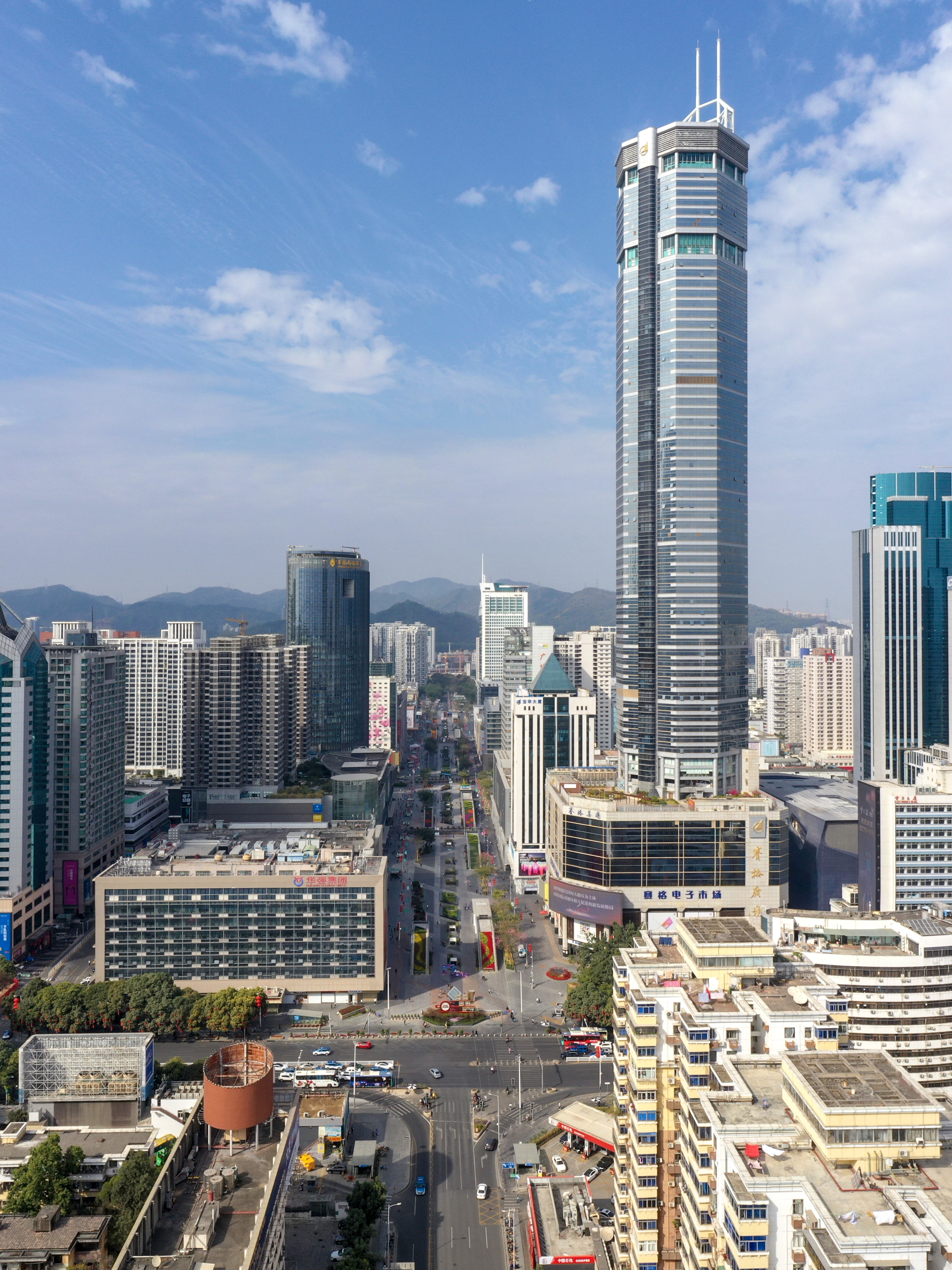
- Huaqiangbei & Shennan Cross in 2021
- Interactive map of Huaqiangbei
- Country: China
- Province: Guangdong
- City: Shenzhen
- District: Futian District

Area
  - Total: 2.9 km^{2} (1.1 sq mi)

Population
  - Total: 160,000
  - Density: 55,000/km^{2} (140,000/sq mi)

Huaqiangbei
- Simplified Chinese: 华强北
- Traditional Chinese: 華強北
- Literal meaning: Huaqiang (China Strong) North
Transcriptions
Standard Mandarin
- Hanyu Pinyin: Huáqiángběi
Yue: Cantonese
- Jyutping: waa4 koeng4 bak1

Huaqiangbei (Chinese: 华强北; lit. 'Huaqiang North') is a subdistrict of Futian, Shenzhen, Guangdong Province, China. It is one of Shenzhen's notable retail areas, having one of the largest electronics markets in the world. The area's status as a major electronics manufacturing hub, and sprawling electronics marketplaces have earned it (and Shenzhen) occidental nicknames such as "China's Silicon Valley", and the "Silicon Valley of Hardware". Multiple malls contain various businesses. In 2020, the area had about 38,000 businesses. Huaqiangbei is known in China for selling cheap electronics. Most of the smartphones in China come from this area. Many mobile phones stolen in Europe and US are also smuggled into the region.

== Location ==
The subdistrict runs from Shennan Road at SEG Plaza near Huaqiang Road Station of the Shenzhen Metro for 1 kilometre (0.62 mi) north to the Pavilion Hotel. It is at the spine of a shopping district, with cross streets Zhenzhong Road (振中路), Zhenhua Road (振华路) and Zhenxing Road (振兴路). Huafa Road (华发路) is immediately parallel to the east, with Yannan Road (燕南路) further away. The central area of the district is along Huaqiang Road (华强路), a busy pedestrian street which the district is named after.

== Locale ==
The area is characterized by tree-lined streets with wide (5 to 20 metres (16 to 66 ft)) footpaths. There are three Shenzhen Metro stations in the area:

- Huaqiang Road station on Line 1
- Huaqiang North station on Line 2 and Line 7
- Huaxin station on Line 3 and Line 7

Huaqiang North and Huaxin stations are connected by an underground passage, and walking to Huaqiang Road station requires going up onto street-level.

== Gallery ==
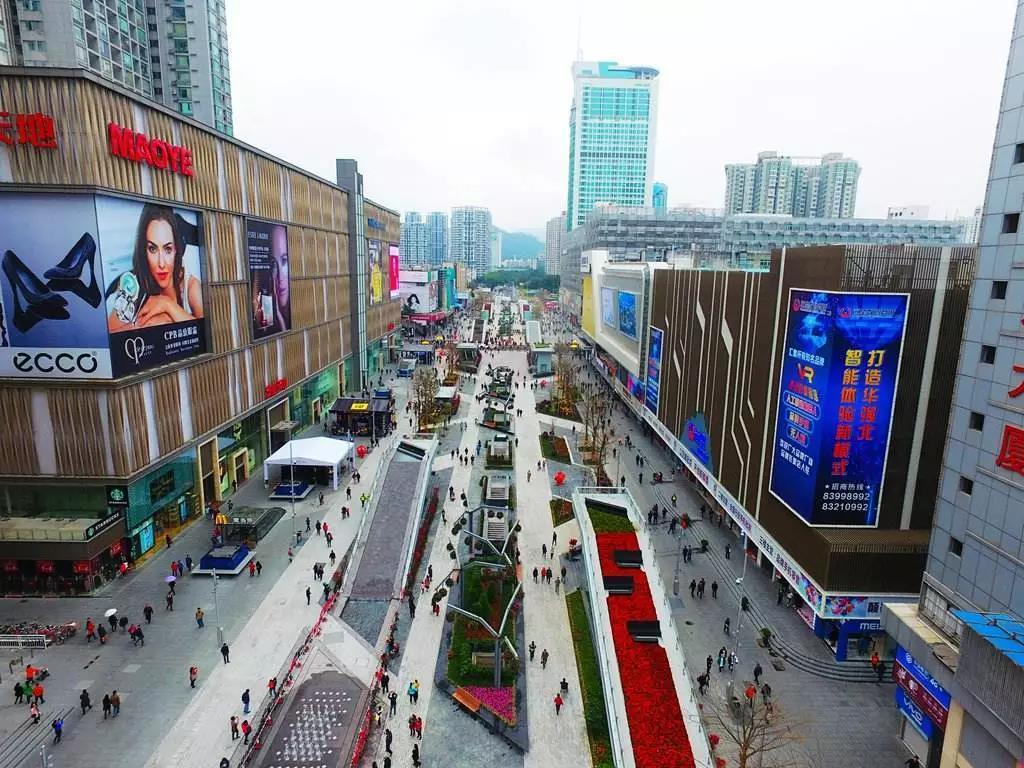
Huaqiangbei 2024

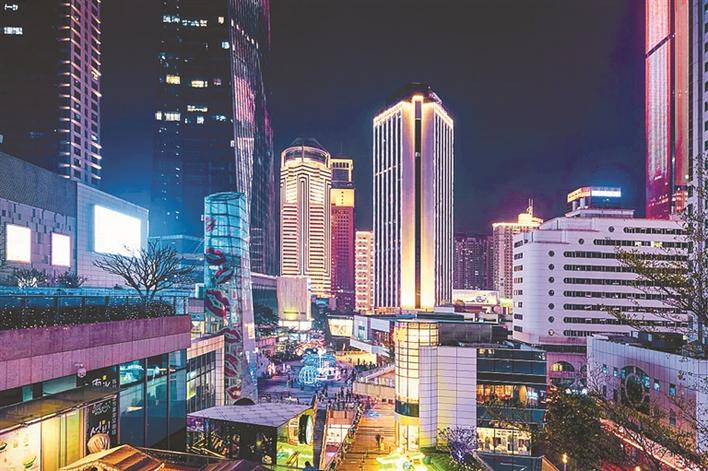
Huaqiangbei at night

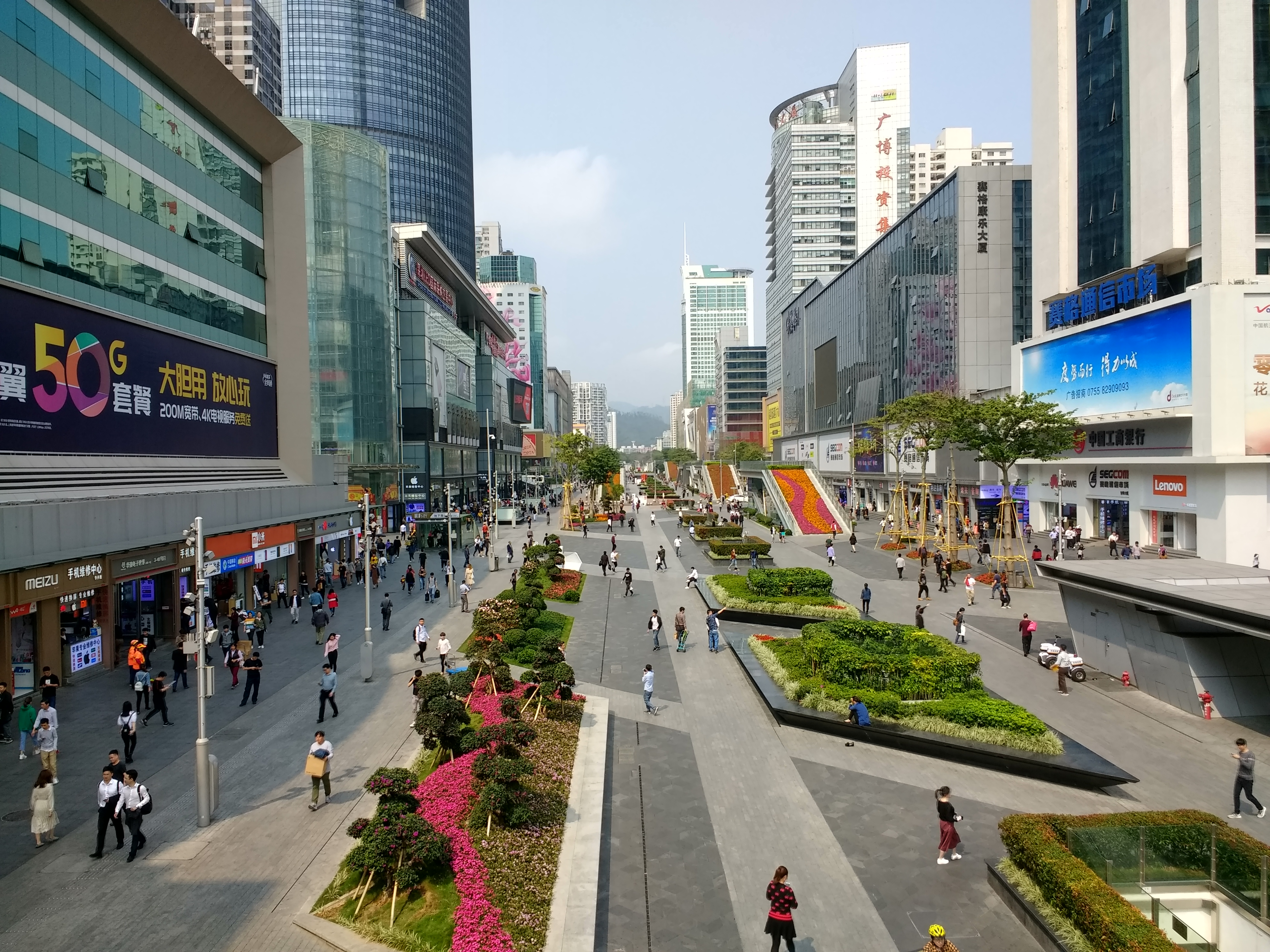
Huaqiangbei pedestrian street

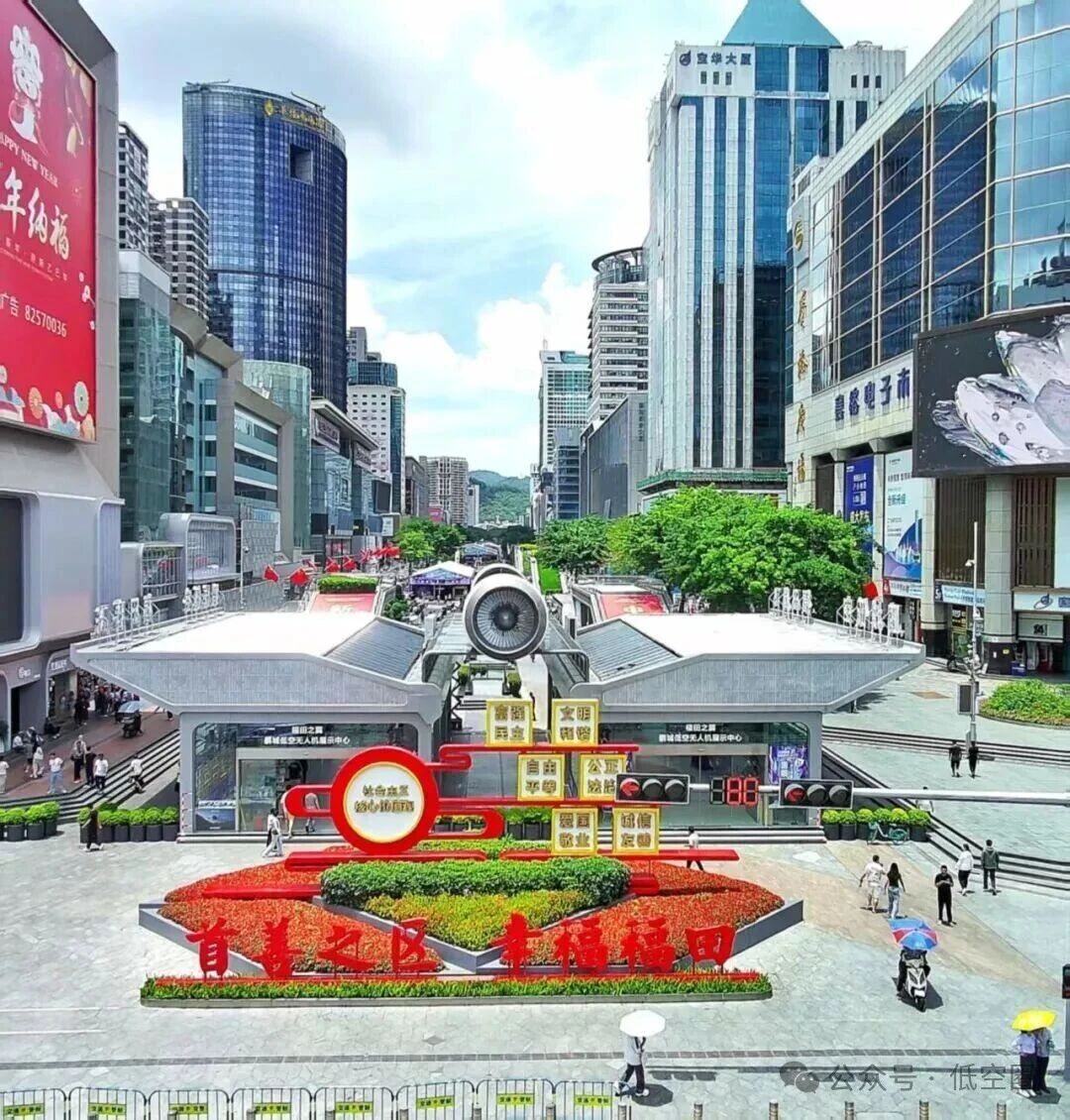
Huaqiangbei 2025

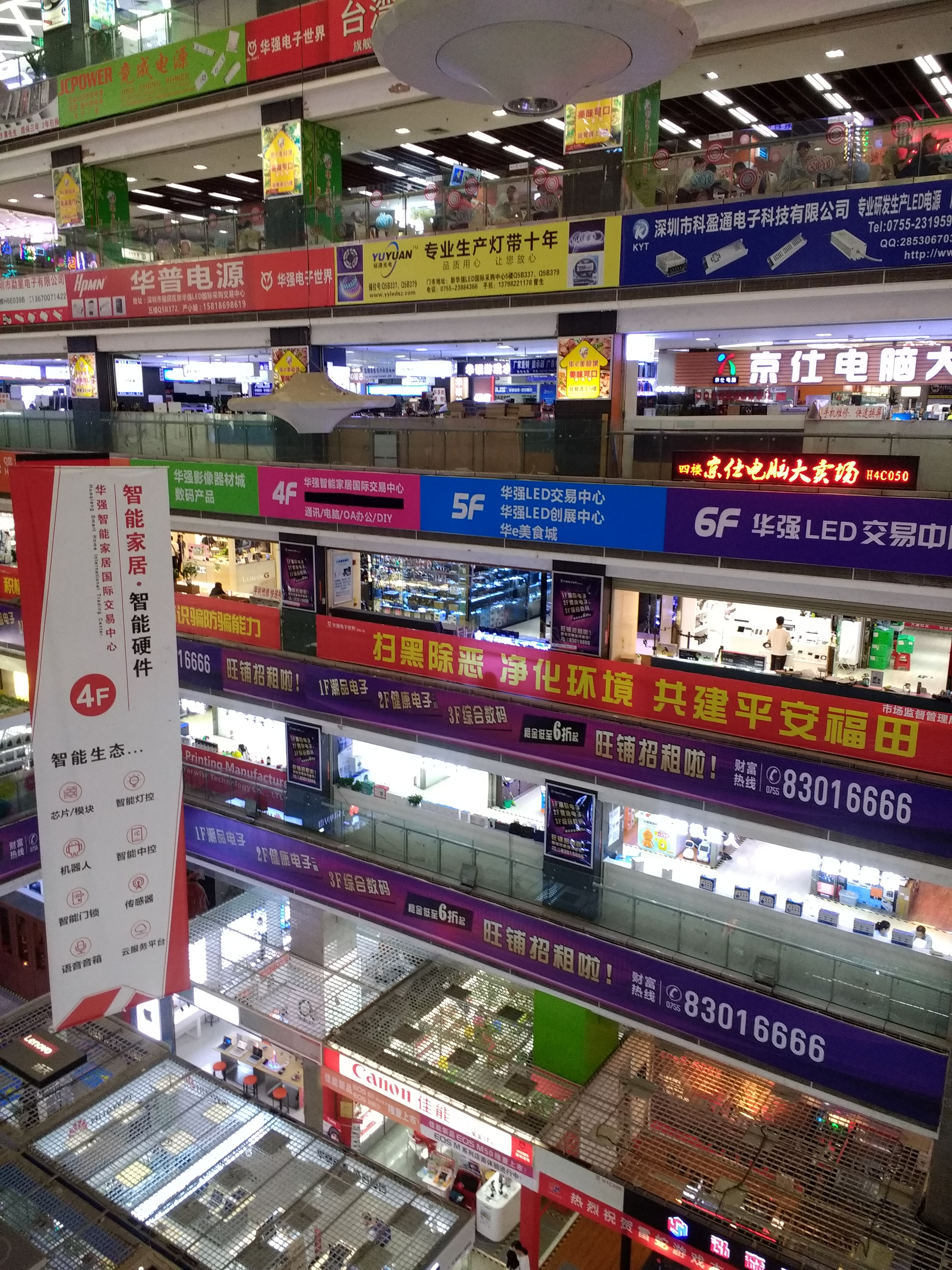
Huaqiang Electronics World (华强电子世界)

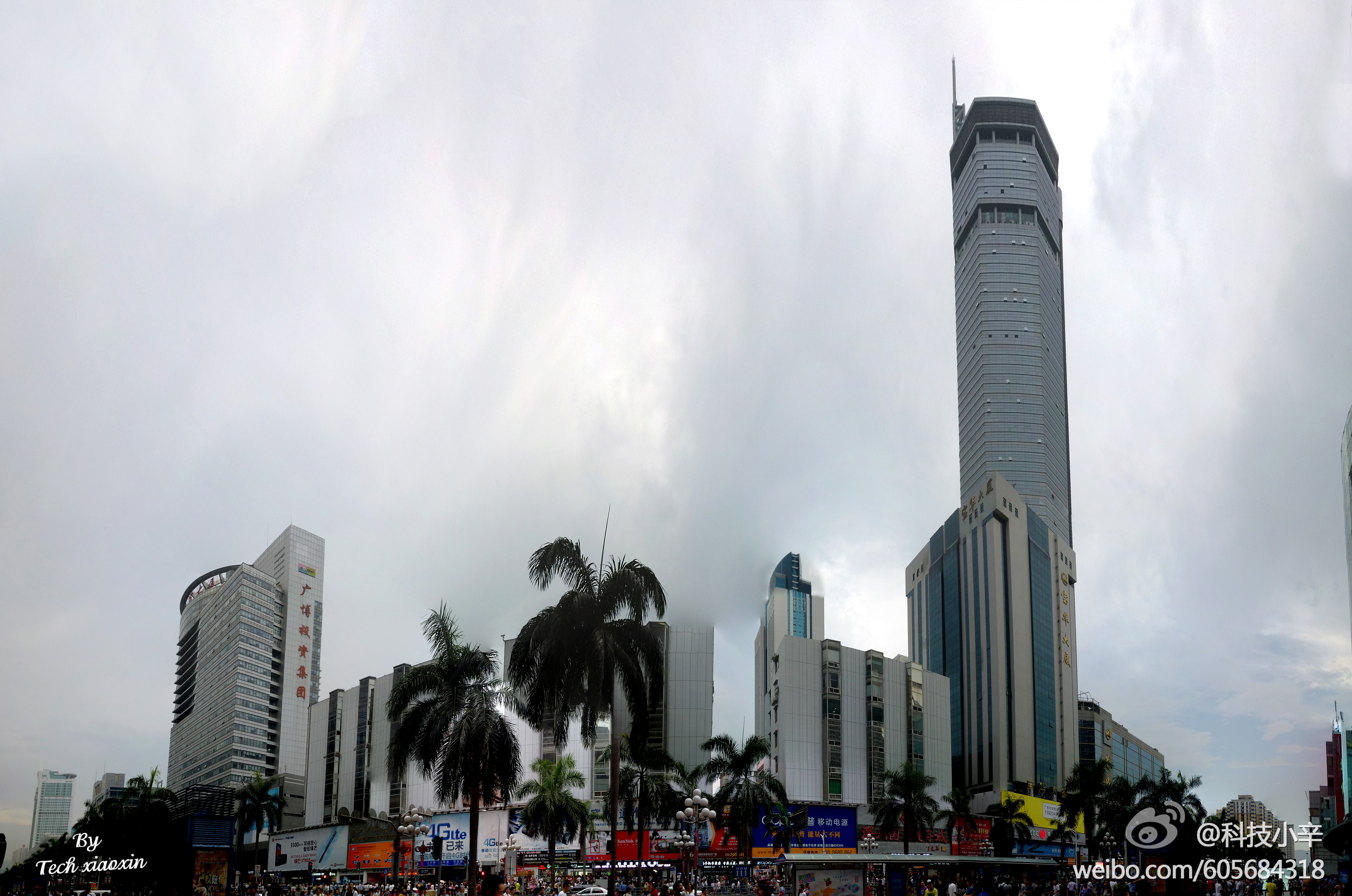
Huaqiangbei, 2012

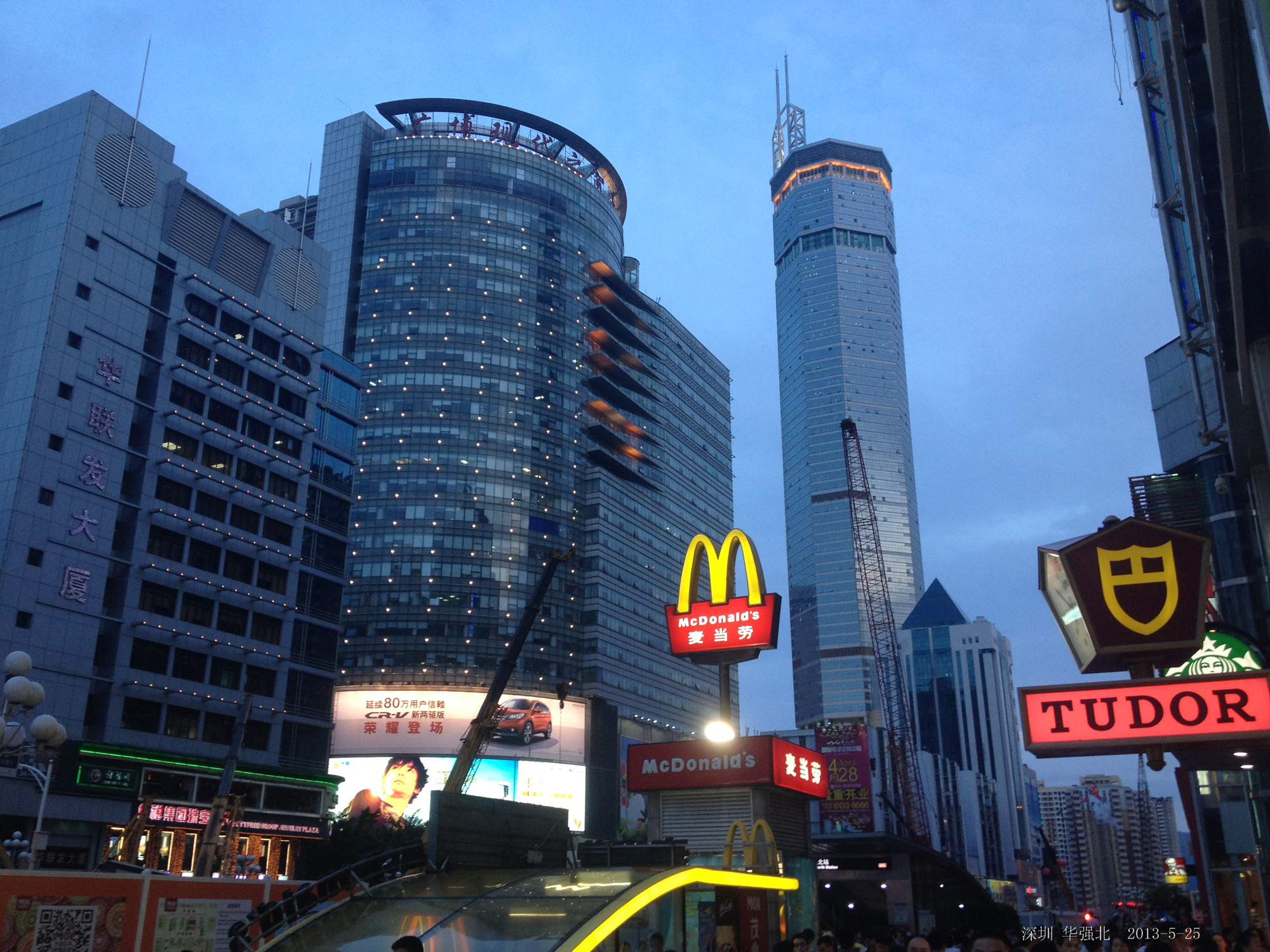
Huaqiangbei street view, 2013

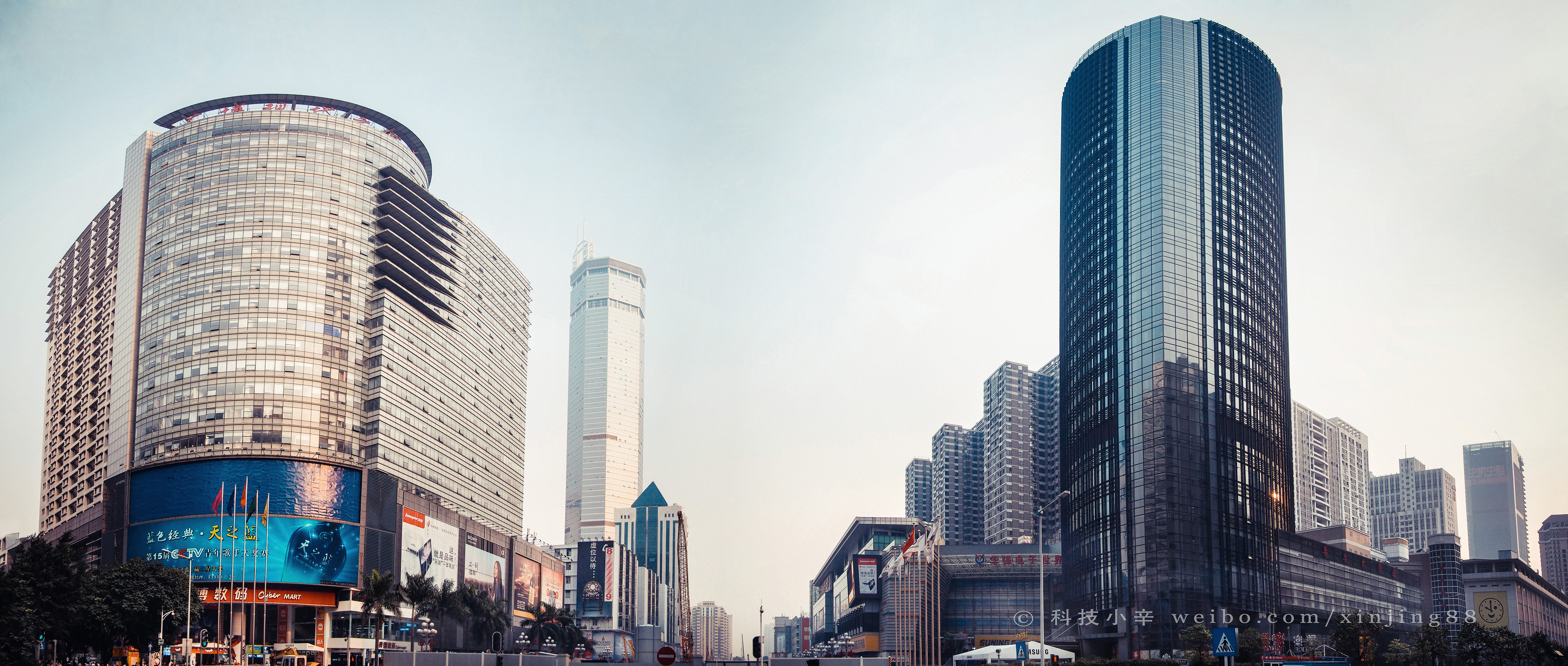
Huaqiangbei panorama, 2013

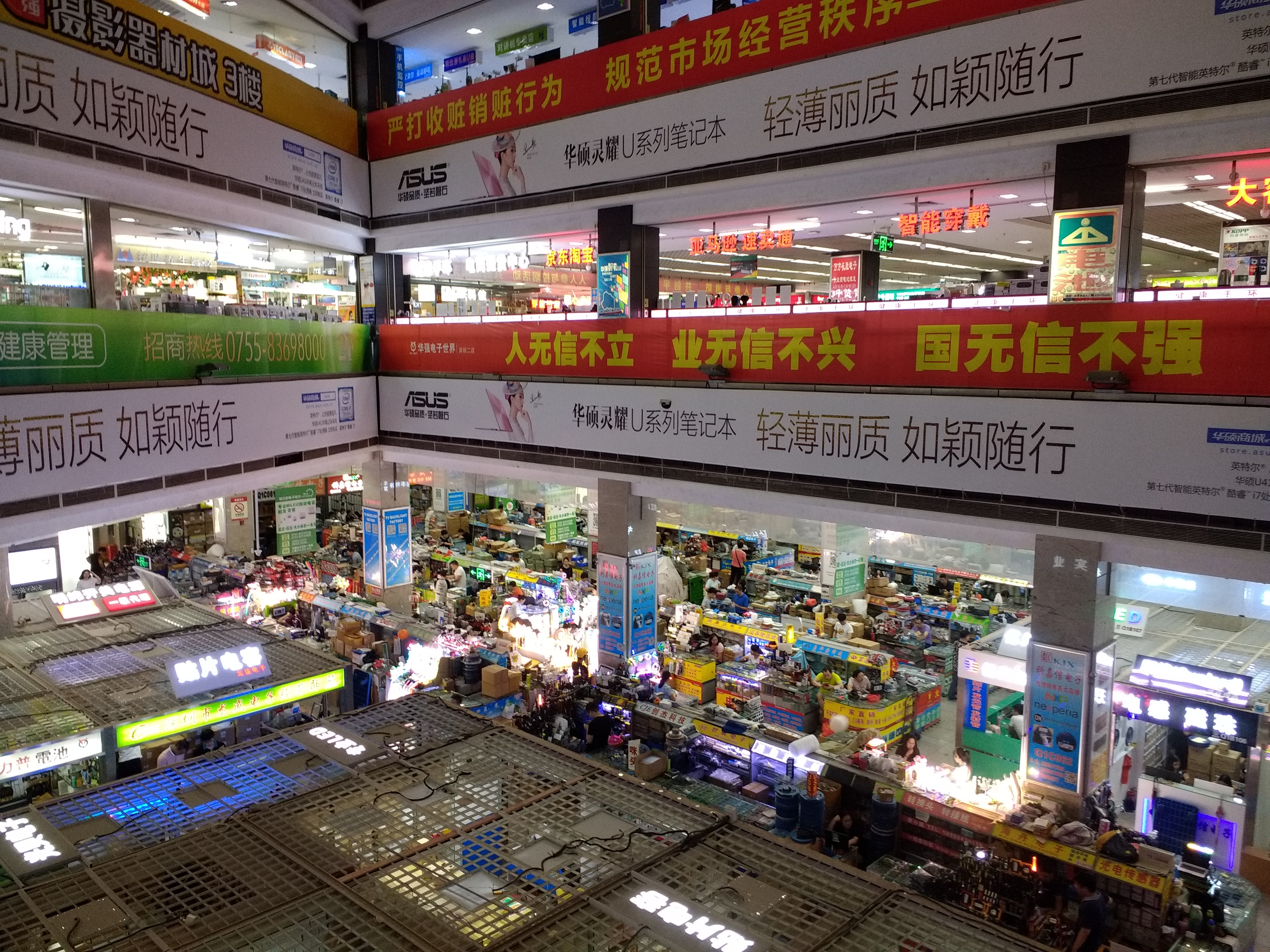
