= Sports Center station (Shenzhen Metro) =

Metro station in Shenzhen, Guangdong, China

Coordinates: 22°32′58″N 114°7′22″E

Sports Center 体育中心
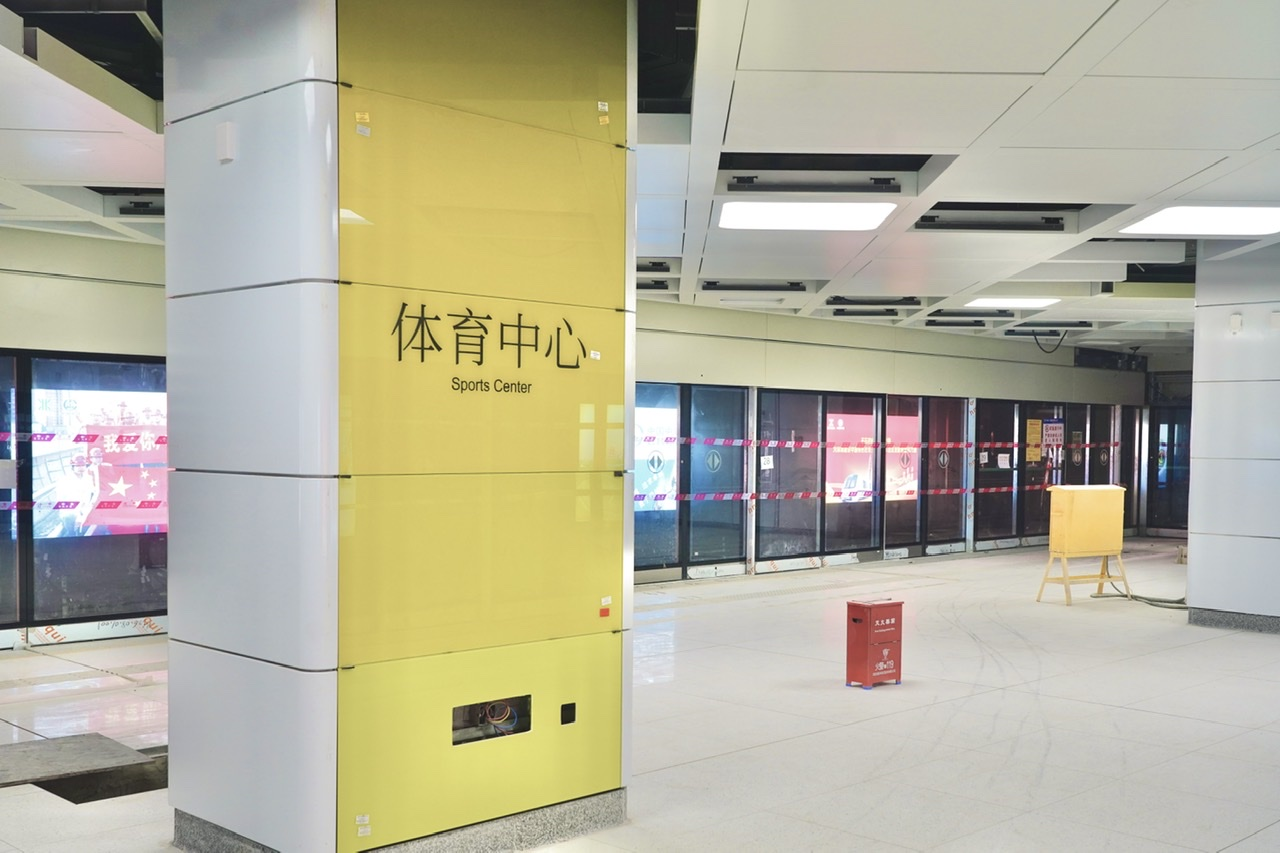

General information
- Location: Futian District, Shenzhen, Guangdong; China
- Operated by: SZMC (Shenzhen Metro Group)
- Line: Line 6
- Platforms: 2 (1 island platform)
- Tracks: 2

Construction
- Structure type: Underground
- Accessible: Yes

History
- Opened: 18 August 2020

Services
Preceding station	Shenzhen Metro	Following station
Bagualing towards Songgang	Line 6	Tongxinling towards Science Museum
Location

Sports Center station (Chinese: 体育中心站; pinyin: Tǐyù Zhōngxīn Zhàn) is a station on Line 6 of the Shenzhen Metro. It opened 18 August 2020.

== Station layout ==
G	-	Exit
B1F; Concourse	Lobby	Customer Service, Shops, Vending machines, ATMs
B2F; Platforms	Platform	← Line 6 towards Science Museum (Tongxinling)
B2F; Platforms	Island platform, doors will open on the left
B2F; Platforms	Platform	→ Line 6 towards Songgang (Bagualing) →

== Exits ==
Exit		Destination
Exit A	A1	Yuanlingxincun, Yuanzhong Garden, Yuanling primary school, Yuanling experimental primary school
Exit A	A2	Baihua Culture Center, Baihuayuan, Nantian Frist Garden, Shenzhen Art School, Shenzhen Futian District Fourth Kindergarten
Exit A	A3	Baihua Culture Center, Baihuayuan, Nantian Frist Garden, Shenzhen Art School, Shenzhen Futian District Fourth Kindergarten
Exit B		Shenzhen Sports Center, Sports south community park
