= Huaqiang North station =

Metro station in Shenzhen, Guangdong, China

Huaqiang North 华强北
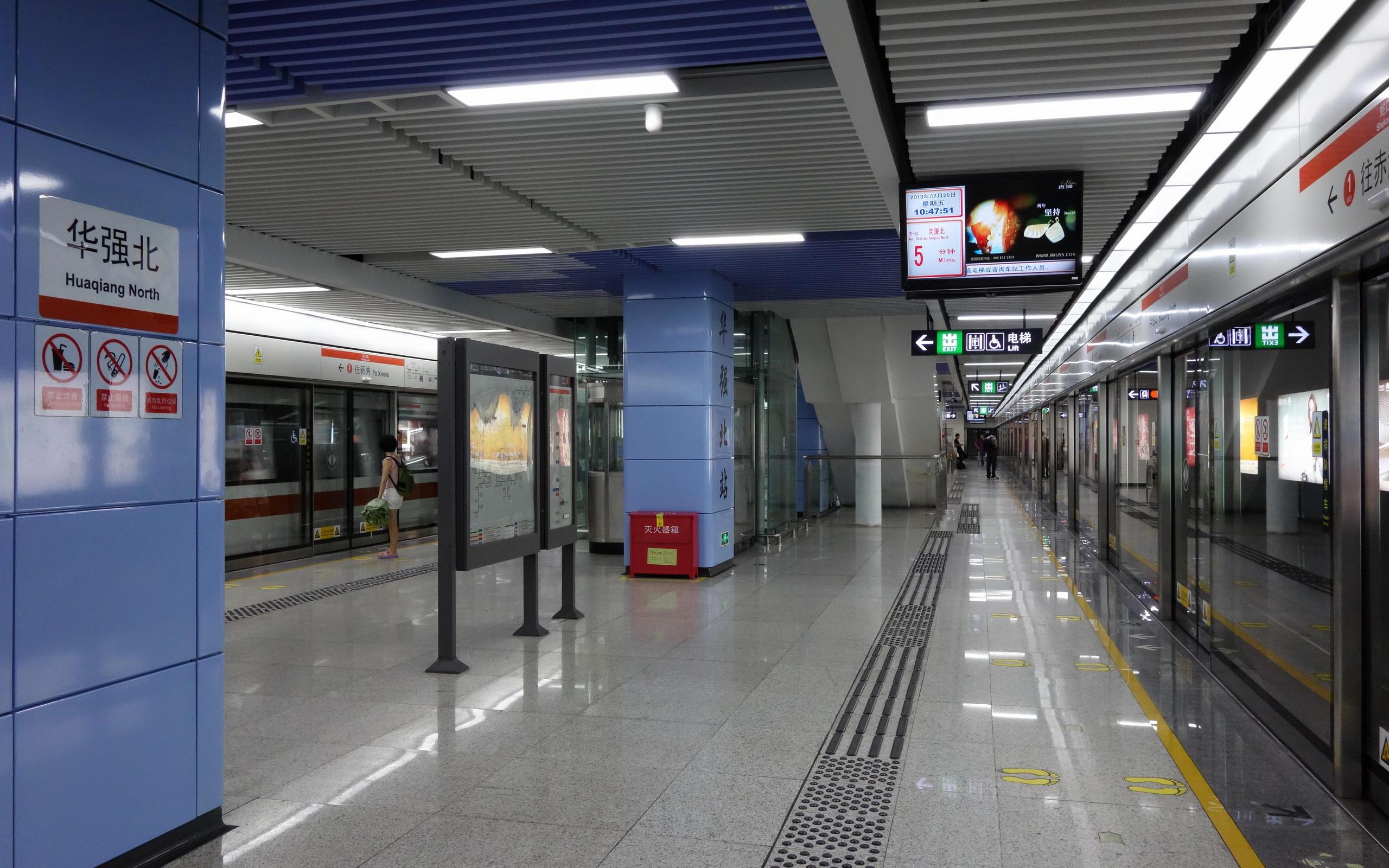
- Line 2 platform

Chinese name
- Traditional Chinese: 華強北
- Simplified Chinese: 华强北
Transcriptions
Standard Mandarin
- Hanyu Pinyin: Huáqiāng Běi
Yue: Cantonese
- Jyutping: Waa4 Koeng4 Bak1

General information
- Location: Futian District, Shenzhen, Guangdong; China
- Coordinates: 22°32′39″N 114°5′7″E
- Operated by: SZMC (Shenzhen Metro Group)
- Lines: Line 2; Line 7
- Platforms: 4 (2 island platforms)
- Tracks: 4
- Connections: 1 (via Huaqiang Road)

Construction
- Structure type: Underground
- Accessible: Yes

Other information
- Station code: 224

History
- Opened: Line 2: 28 June 2011 (14 years ago); Line 7: 28 October 2016 (9 years ago)

Services
Preceding station	Shenzhen Metro	Following station
Gangxia North towards Chiwan	Line 2	Yannan towards Liantang (Line 8: Xichong)
Huaqiang South towards SZU Lihu Campus	Line 7	Huaxin towards Tai'an
Out-of-station interchange
Gangxia towards Airport East	Line 1 transfer at Huaqiang Road	Science Museum towards Luohu
Route map
Location

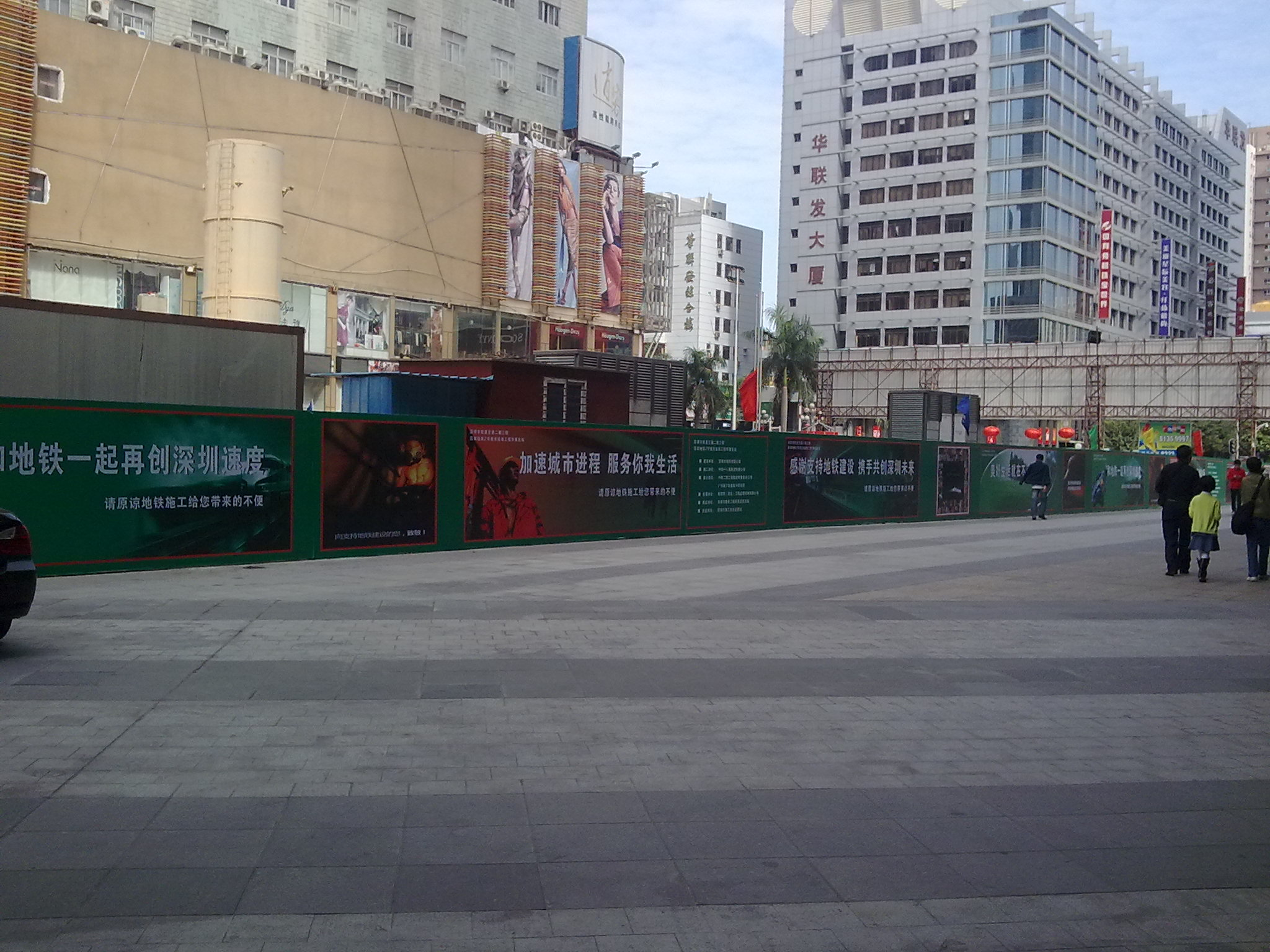
Huaqiang North Station when under construction

Huaqiang North station (Chinese: 华强北站; pinyin: Huáqiāngběi Zhàn) is a station of Shenzhen Metro Line 2 and Line 7. Line 2 platforms opened on 28 June 2011 and Line 7 platforms opened on 28 October 2016. It serves the shopping district of Huaqiangbei.

== Station layout ==
G	-	Exits A-C, D2
B1F; Concourse	Lobby	Ticket machines, customer service, shops, vending machines, transfer passage between Line 2 and Line 7
B2F; 2 8 Platforms		2 towards Chiwan (Gangxia North)
B2F; 2 8 Platforms	Island platform, doors will open on the left
B2F; 2 8 Platforms		8 towards Xichong (Yannan)
B3F; 7 Platforms		7 towards SZU Lihu Campus (Huaqiang South)
B3F; 7 Platforms	Island platform, doors will open on the left
B3F; 7 Platforms		7 towards Tai'an (Huaxin)

== Exits ==
Exit	Destination
Exit A	Zhenhua Road, Huaqiang Plaza, Huaqiang North Road, SEG Plaza, Huaqiang Electric World, Loto Underground Commercial Street, Shanghai Hotel
Exit B	Huaqiang North Road, Zhenhua Road, Shenfang Building, Sundan, Shenzhen New Fortune Magazine House, Shenzhen Panorama Network, Shenzhen Securities Information
Exit C	Zhonghang Beiyuan, Central Park
Exit D2	Huaqiang Road station (Exit A)

== See also ==
- Huaqiangbei
