= Yannan station =

Metro station in Shenzhen, China

Yannan 燕南
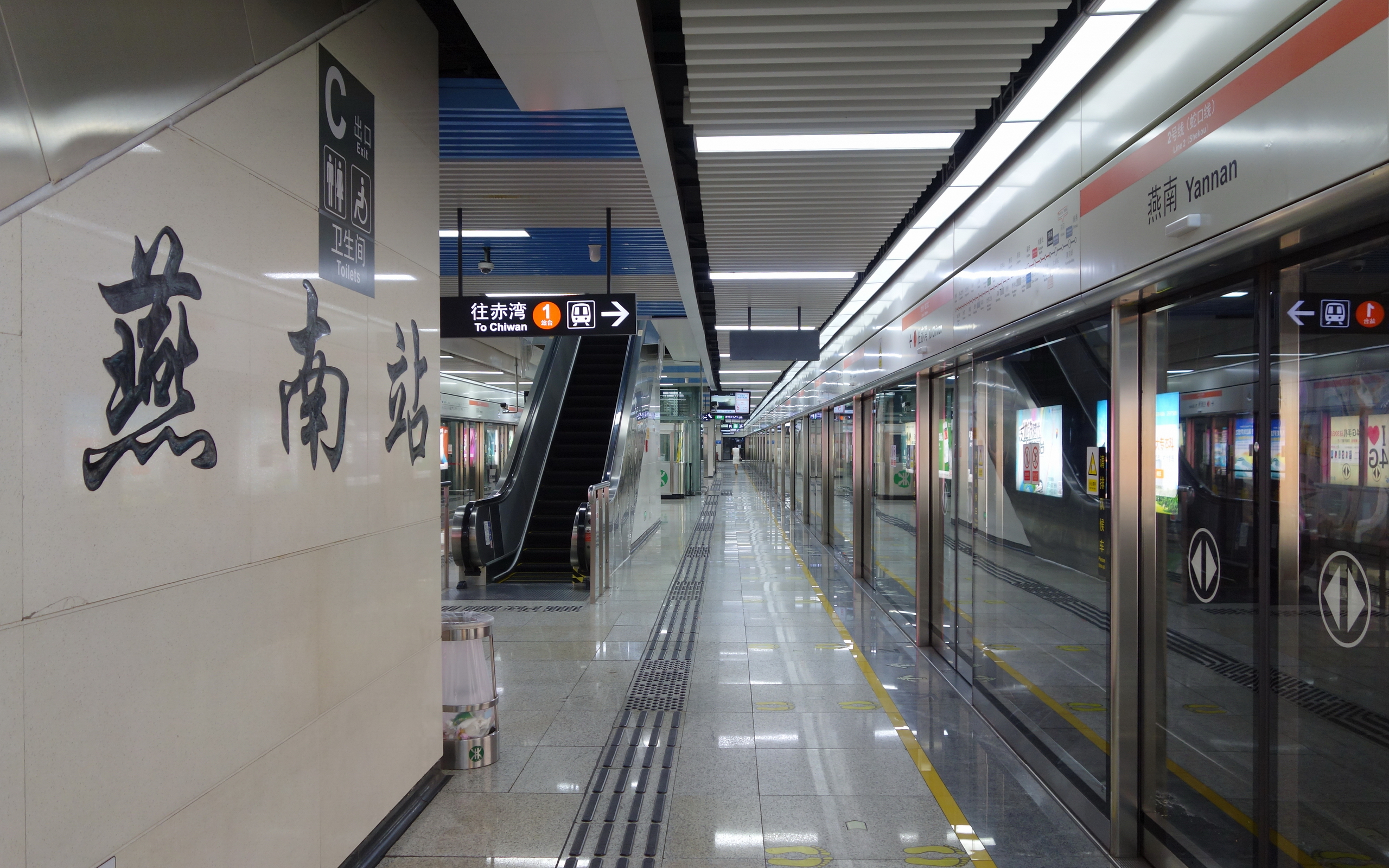
- Platform

Chinese name
- Chinese: 燕南
- Literal meaning: Swallow south
Transcriptions
Standard Mandarin
- Hanyu Pinyin: Yànnán
Yue: Cantonese
- Jyutping: Jin3 Naam4

General information
- Location: Futian District, Shenzhen, Guangdong; China
- Coordinates: 22°32′40″N 114°5′33″E
- Operated by: SZMC (Shenzhen Metro Group)
- Line: Line 2
- Platforms: 2 (1 island platform)
- Tracks: 2

Construction
- Structure type: Underground
- Accessible: Yes

Other information
- Station code: 225

History
- Opened: 28 June 2011 (14 years ago)

Services
| Preceding station | Shenzhen Metro | Following station |
|---|---|---|
| Huaqiang North towards Chiwan | Line 2 | Grand Theater towards Liantang (Line 8: Xichong) |
Route map
Location

Yannan station (Chinese: 燕南站; pinyin: Yànnán Zhàn) is a station of Shenzhen Metro Line 2, in the Huaqiangbei area of Futian District. It opened in June 2011 with the line's eastern section.

== Station layout ==
| G | - | Exit |
| B1F; Concourse | Lobby | Customer Service, Shops, Vending machines, ATMs |
| B2F; Platforms | | 2 towards Chiwan (Huaqiang North) |
| B2F; Platforms | Island platform, doors will open on the left |
| B2F; Platforms | | 8 towards Xichong (Grand Theater) |

== Exits ==
| Exit | Destination |
|---|---|
| Exit A | Yannan Road |
| Exit B | Yannan Road, Zhenhua Road, Second Office of Municipal Government, Housing & Construction Bureau of Shenzhen Municipality, Shenzhen Construction Testing Center, Integrated TCM & Western Medicine Branch of Shenzhen Second People's Hospital, Littlesheep Zhenhua, Shenzhen City College |
| Exit C | Languang Road, Zhenhua Road, Mingtong Digital Town, Sangda Electronics & Communications Market, Longsheng Digital Town |

== Gallery ==
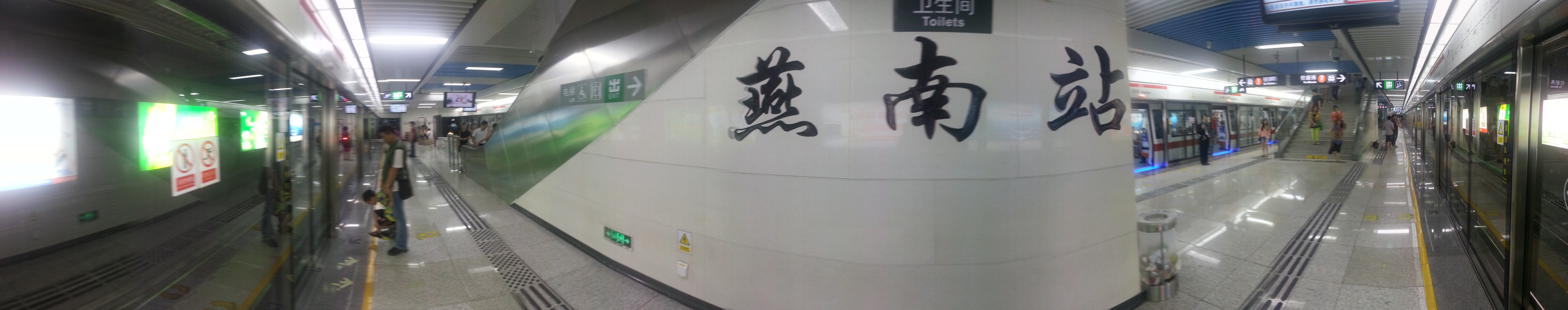
The island platform

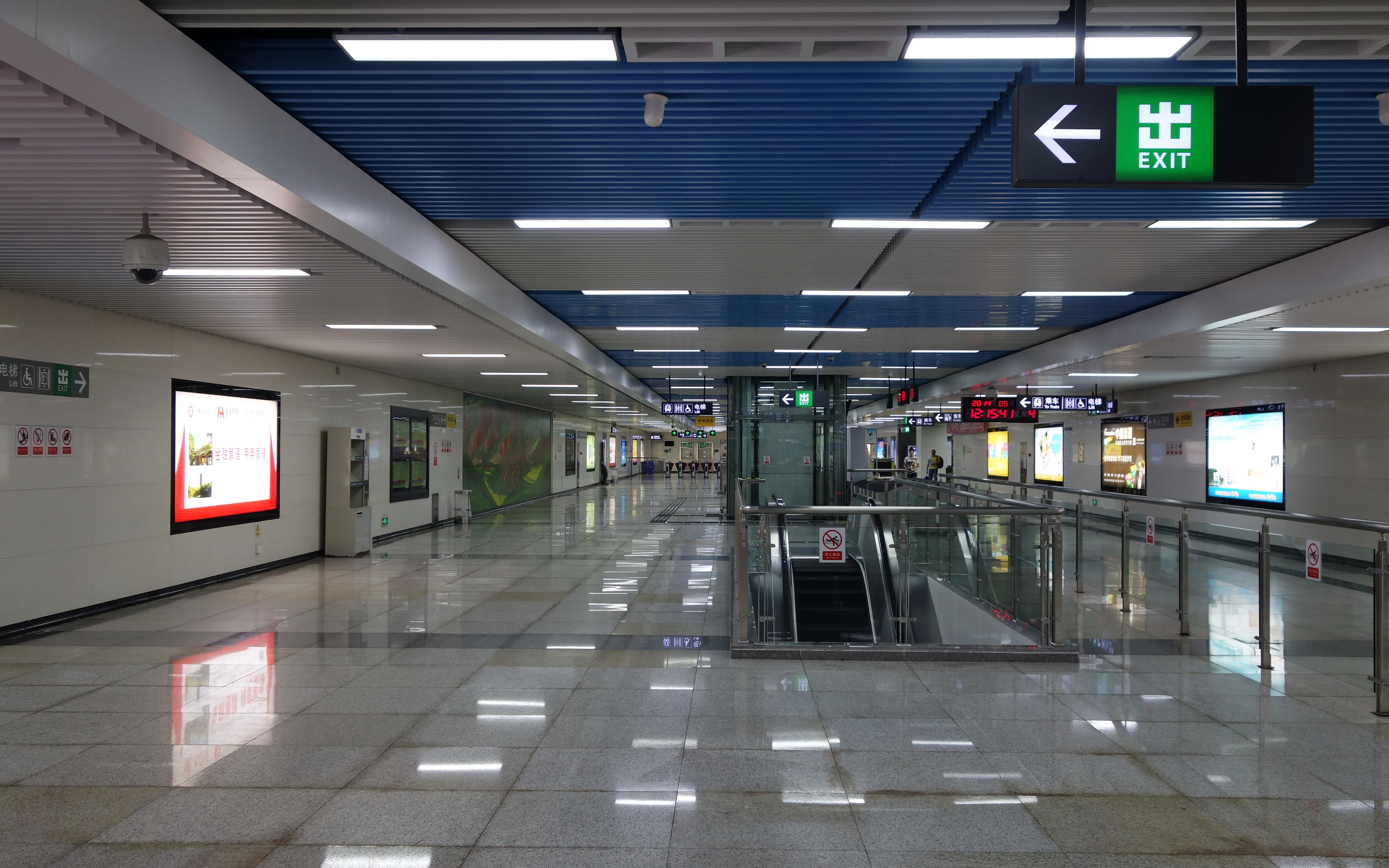
The concourse

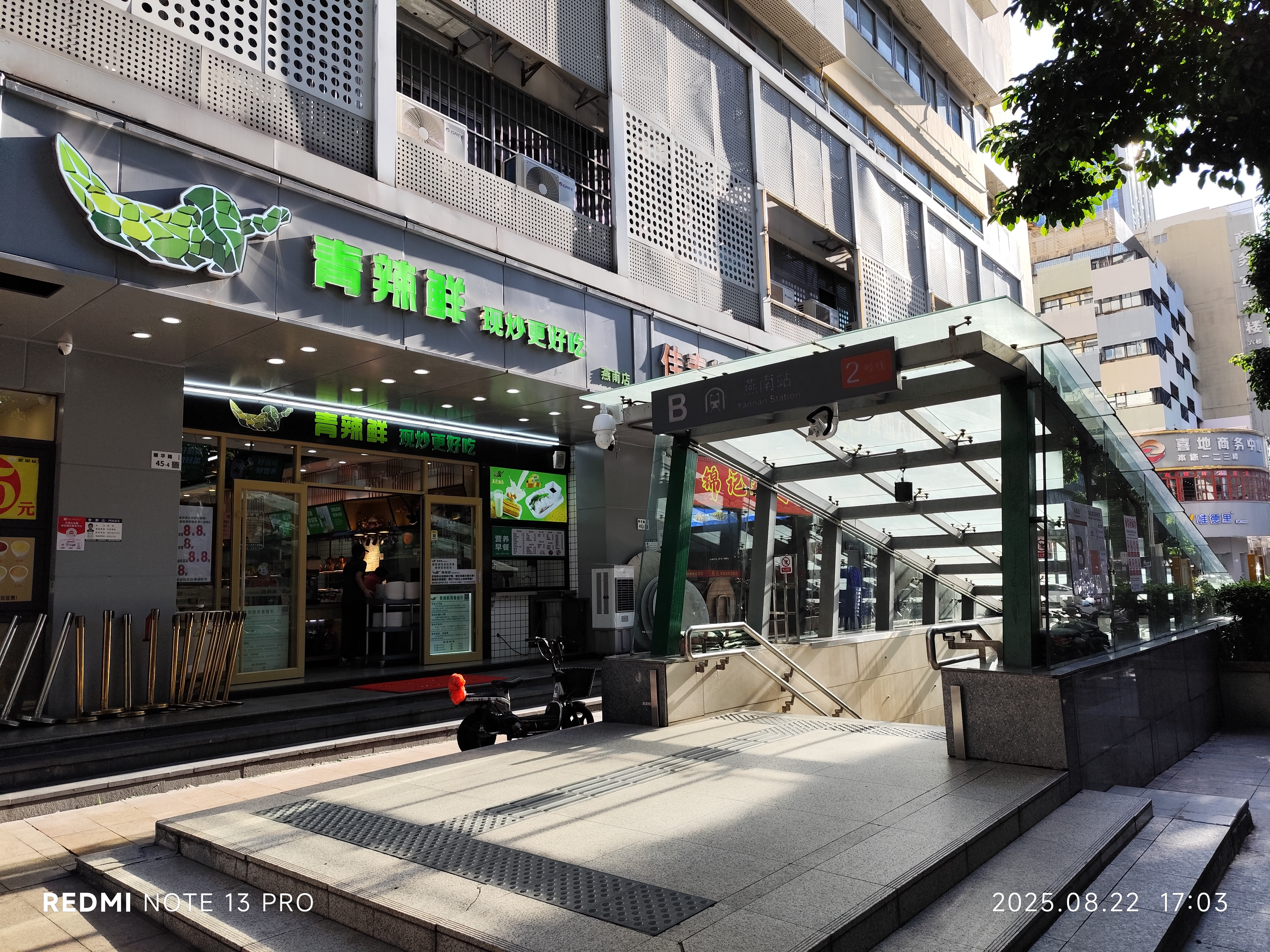
Exit B
