= Huaxin station =

Metro station in Shenzhen, Guangdong, China

Huaxin 华新
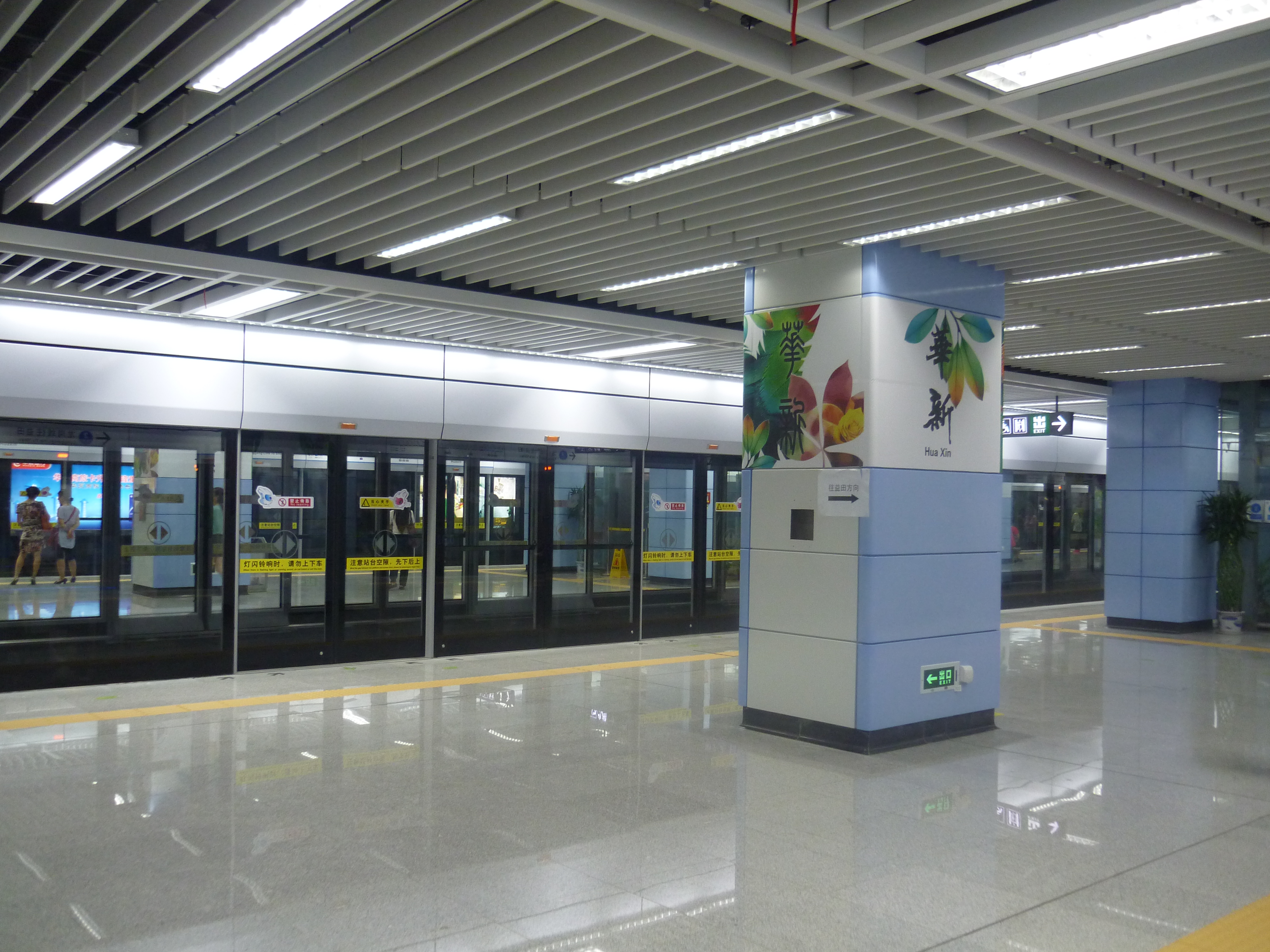
- Line 3 platform

General information
- Location: Futian District, Shenzhen, Guangdong; China
- Coordinates: 22°32′56″N 114°5′12″E
- Operated by: SZMC (Shenzhen Metro Group)
- Lines: Line 3; Line 7
- Platforms: 6 (3 island platforms)
- Tracks: 5

Construction
- Structure type: Underground
- Accessible: Yes

History
- Opened: Line 3: 28 June 2011 (15 years ago); Line 7: 28 October 2016 (9 years ago)

Services
Preceding station	Shenzhen Metro	Following station
Tongxinling towards Pingdi Liulian	Line 3	Lianhuacun towards Futian Bonded Area
Huaqiang North towards SZU Lihu Campus	Line 7	Huangmugang towards Tai'an
Track layout
3 Upper platforms
7 Lower platforms
Location

Huaxin station (Chinese: 华新站; pinyin: Huáxīn Zhàn), is a station of Shenzhen Metro Line 3 and Line 7. Line 3 platforms opened on 28 June 2011 and Line 7 platforms opened on 28 October 2016.

== Station layout ==
G	-	Exits A-F
B1F; Concourse	Lobby	Ticket Machines, Customer Service, Shops, Vending Machines
B2F; 3 Platforms	Platform	3 towards Futian Bonded Area (Lianhuacun)
B2F; 3 Platforms	Island platform, doors will open on the left or right
B2F; 3 Platforms	Platform ↑	3 termination platform
B2F; 3 Platforms	Platform ↓	3 A.M peak towards Tangkeng (Tongxinling); 3 towards Pingdi Liulian (Tongxinling)
B2F; 3 Platforms	Island platform, doors will open on the left or right
B2F; 3 Platforms	Platform	3 towards Pingdi Liulian (Tongxinling)
B3F; 7 Platforms	Platform	7 towards SZU Lihu Campus (Huaqiang North)
B3F; 7 Platforms	Island platform, doors will open on the left
B3F; 7 Platforms	Platform	7 towards Tai'an (Huangmugang)

== Exits ==
Exit		Destination
Exit A	A1	Hongli Road (S), Gongfa Road, Children's World, Zhenxing Hotel
Exit A	A2	Huaqiang North Road (S), Sundan, Gome, Women's World, Gang'ao Digital Town, Maoye Department Store
Exit B	B	Hongli Road (S), Huafa North Road, Qunxing Plaza, Suning, SEG Science & Technology Park
Exit B	B2	Hongli Road (E), SEG Science & Technology Park, Stars Square
Exit C		Hongli Road (N), Baihua 7th Road, Pavilion Hotel, Chunmanyuan Restaurant, Fenghuang Restaurant
Exit D		Hongli Road (N), Huaqiang North Road (N), Huaxincun, Bank of Communications' Building
Exit E		Changtai Garden, Changcheng Community Workstation, Baihua 4th Road, Changyi Garden
Exit F		Huaxincun, BCM Building, Huaxin Road
