= Changsheng =

Changsheng may refer to:

- Changsheng Bio-Technology, Changchun, China
- Ever Power IPP Co., Ltd. or Changsheng Power
  - Changsheng Power Plant, Taoyuan, Taiwan
- Luo teaching, or Changsheng teaching
- A courtesy name of Guan Yu
- Changsheng (長生國), the kingdom founded by Zhuang rebel, Nong Quanfu
