= Longjing Station =

Longjing Station may refer to:

- Longjing Station (Shenzhen) (龙井站) on Line 7 of the Shenzhen Metro in Shenzhen, People's Republic of China
- Longjing Station (Taiwan) (龍井車站) on the Western Line of the Taiwan Railway Administration
