= Taichung Power Plant =

Power plant in Longjing, Taichung, Taiwan

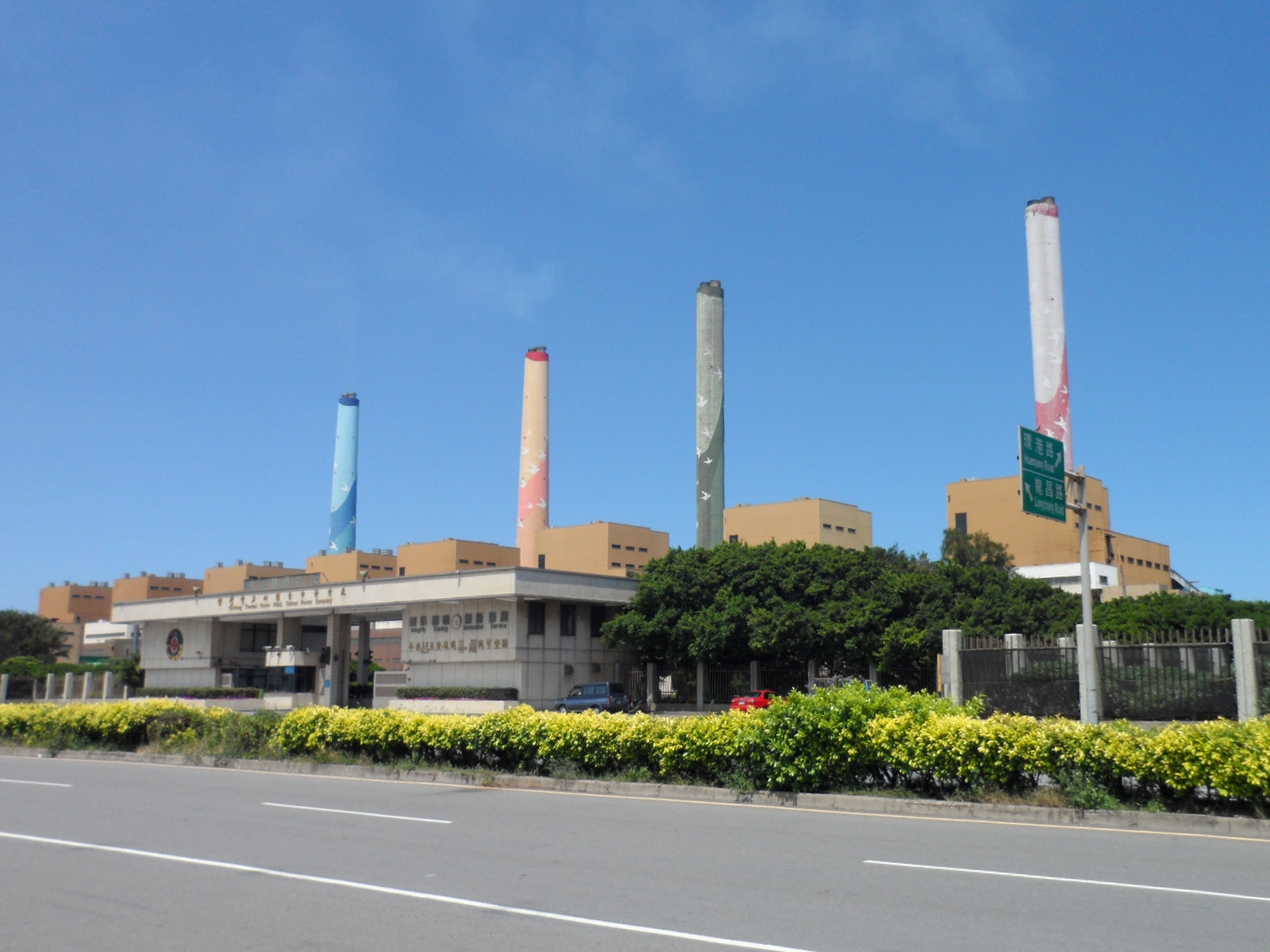
- Official name: 台中發電廠
- Country: Taiwan
- Location: Longjing District, Taichung City
- Coordinates: 24°12′46″N 120°28′52″E
- Status: Operational
- Construction began: 1986
- Commission date: July 1990 (Unit 1-4 gas); March 1991 (Unit 1 coal); August 1991 (Unit 2 coal); June 1992 (Unit 3 coal); October 1992 (Unit 4 coal); March 1996 (Unit 5 coal); May 1996 (Unit 6 coal); October 1996 (Unit 7 coal); June 1997 (Unit 8 coal); August 2005 (Unit 9 coal); June 2006 (Unit 10 coal)
- Owner: Taipower
- Operator: Taiwan Power Company

Thermal power station
- Primary fuel: Bituminous coal
- Secondary fuel: Natural gas

Power generation
- Units operational: 10 X 550 MW (coal); 4 X 70 MW (natural gas)
- Make and model: General Electric; Toshiba
- Nameplate capacity: 5,780 MW
- Annual net output: 27.61 TWh

External links
- Commons: Related media on Commons

The Taichung Power Plant (Chinese: 台中發電廠; pinyin: Táizhōng Fādiànchǎng) is a coal-fired power plant in Longjing, Taichung, Taiwan (ROC). With an installed coal-fired generation capacity of 5,500 MW, it is the fourth largest coal-fired power station in the world. Together with its gas-fired and wind generation units, the total installed capacity of the plant is 5,824 MW.

In November 2017, the Taichung city government ordered that the Taichung Power Plant reduce its coal consumption by 24% starting in January 2018. The plant is estimated to have been one of the ten most carbon polluting coal-fired power plants in the world in 2018, at 29.9 million tons of carbon dioxide, and relative emissions are estimated at 1.282 g per kWh.

== Generation units ==
The power plant consists of ten coal-fired units with nominal capacity of 550 MW each. Four original units were commissioned in 1991 and 1992. In 1996–1997, four additional units were added. The eight older units have a total estimated coal requirement of around 12 million tonnes of bituminous and 2.5 million tonnes of sub-bituminous coal a year. In August 2005 and June 2006, 550 MW sub-critical pressure units 9 and 10 were installed on the adjacent land reclaimed by depositing ash.

In addition to ten coal-fired steam turbines, Taichung Power Plant has another 4 gas turbines and 22 wind turbines which contribute 280 MW and 44 MW of additional power generation capacity, respectively.

== Components ==
The plant has a complex conveyor system. There are three belts from the harbour which bring the coal into the plant via six ship unloaders, two bucket type and four screw type. The coal is either directed straight to a unit or stacked in the coal yard by five stacker/reclaimers. The coal can be reclaimed from here and sent to any of the 10 units. There is built-in redundancy in the critical conveyor paths.

All of the belts are equipped with fire detection system to monitor the temperature along the belt and to sound alarm in the case of fire to minimize damage. The coal-receiving facilities were completed in 1992.

The boiler for each unit is drum type, water-cooled, naturally circulated with dry bottom furnace, balance draft and coal and oil-fired capability.

The steam turbine for each unit is a tandem-compound with four flow exhaust, single reheat and 550 MW rated capacity.

The generators are supercritical steam high power density.

The electrostatic precipitator removes 99.8% of the particulates and classifies them for industrial cement and land reclamation.

The power plant is connected to the grid via a 345 kV switchyard.

== Function ==
The power plant is designed for base load service and is able for daily startup and shutdown operation. The plant's electricity is being sold to Taipower under a 25-year power purchase agreement.

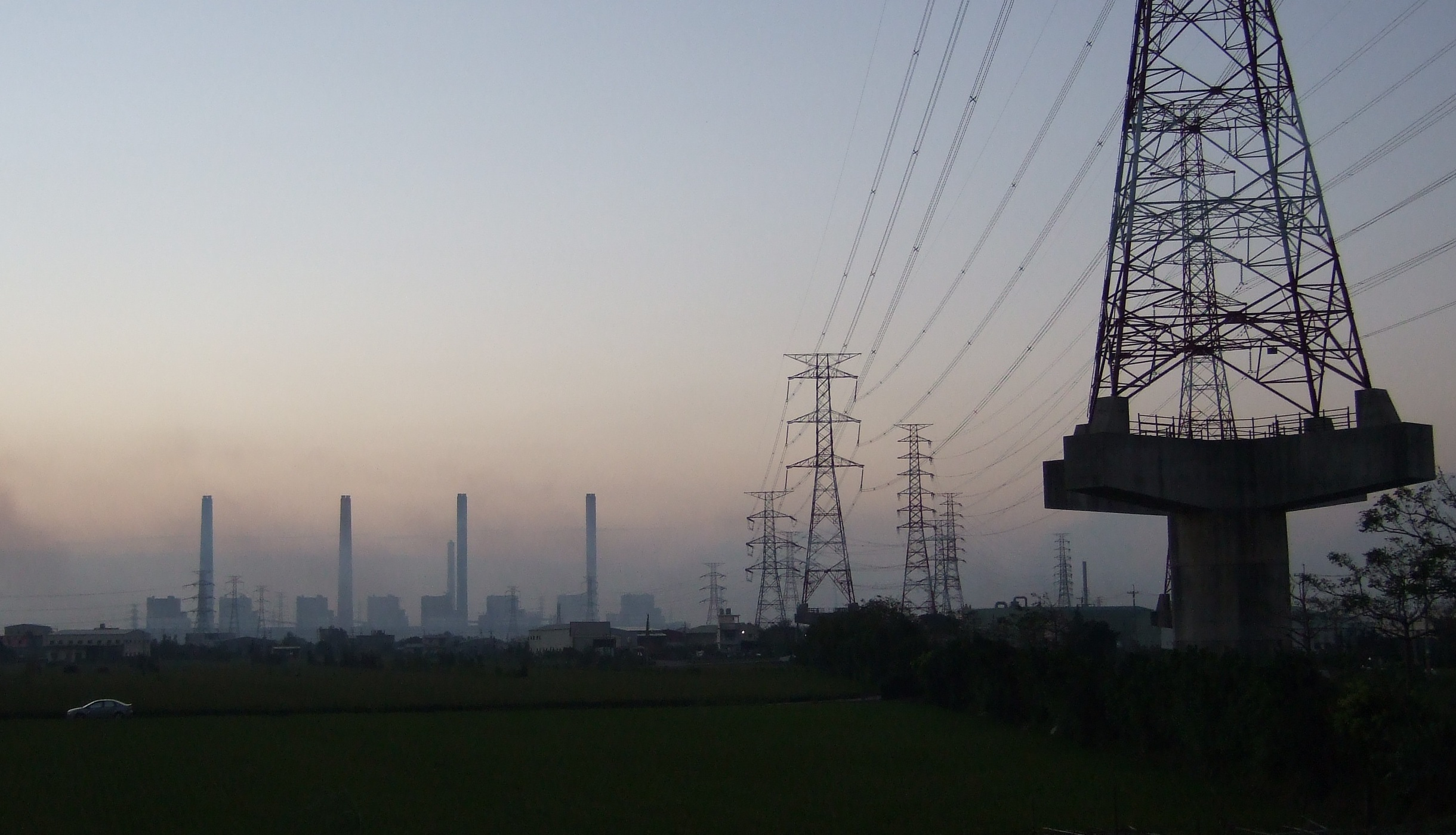
Outgoing transmission line from Taichung Power Plant

== Fuel supply ==
The power plant uses 12 million tons of bituminous and 2.5 million tons of sub-bituminous coal a year. Taipower buys most of the plant coal supply through long-term contracts from Australia, United States, South Africa, Indonesia and other sources. Indonesia is the prime source for the sub-bituminous coal. The remainder of its coal supply is purchased on the spot market.

== Pollution ==
During warnings by the scientific community about increasing prevalence of lung cancer in Taiwan in December 2015, it was claimed that Taichung Power Plant along with the Sixth Naphtha Cracking Plant of the Formosa Plastics Group account for roughly seventy percent of the air pollution in the Central Taiwan region of the country, emitting large quantities of sulfur oxides.

== Future projects ==
Taichung Power Plant plans to add two gas-fired Combined Cycle units each with a capacity of 1.3 gigawatts by 31 August 2025 and 31 August 2026 respectively. Additionally, anywhere from two to four coal-powered units will be decommissioned by 2030 in order to align with the government's policy of air quality improvement.

== Events ==
=== 2017 ===
On 4 August 2017, unit 7 generator of the plant tripped at 9:25 a.m, due to low vacuum in its steam condenser system which triggered the safety protection system. The event caused a power reduction of 500 MW, but it was quickly restored and restarted at 12:35 p.m.

On 5 August 2017, unit 1 generator of the plant malfunctioned due to a broken boiler pipe which led to the reduction of 530 MW power generation.

=== 2021 ===
On 10 June 2021, a fire broke out at the coal conveyor belt of the plant. It started at 7:03 a.m and had been extinguished within 3 hours.

== Awards ==
On 8 November 2010, the power plant won the outstanding award at the 23rd National QCC Competition, organized by Industrial Development Bureau of the Ministry of Economic Affairs.

On 10 July 2016, this power plant won the international award of COLS, organized by the Taiwan Ministry of Power.

== Transportation ==
Taichung Power Plant is accessible West from Longjing Station of Taiwan Railway.

== See also ==
- List of power stations in Taiwan
- Hai-Fu Power Station
- List of coal power stations
- List of largest power stations in the world
- Electricity sector in Taiwan
