= Sun Ba Power Corporation =

Independent power producer of Taiwan

Sun Ba Power Corporation 森霸電力
- Industry: Electric power
- Founded: 29 August 2000
- Headquarters: Neihu, Taipei, Taiwan
- Number of employees: 83
- Website: Official website (in Chinese)

The Sun Ba Power Corporation (traditional Chinese: 森霸電力; simplified Chinese: 森霸电力; pinyin: Sēnbà Diànlì) is an independent power producer company in Taiwan.

== History ==
The Sun Ba Power Corporation was established on 29 August 2000. On 19 August 2004, the company was listed as public company.

== Business ==
The company involves with the business of generation, transmission and distribution of electricity. It is affiliated with Taiwan Cogeneration Corporation, a publicly traded company with active interests in the transmission of electricity, and Taiwan Sugar Corporation, a private company with active interests in the production and distribution of sugar.

== Power plants ==
- Sun Ba Power Plant in Shanshang District, Tainan

== See also ==
- Electricity sector in Taiwan
- List of power stations in Taiwan
