= Sun Ba Power Plant =

Power plant in Shanshang, Tainan, Taiwan

- Official name: 森霸電廠
- Country: Republic of China
- Location: Shanshang, Tainan, Taiwan
- Coordinates: 23°04′56″N 120°21′26″E
- Status: Operational
- Commission date: 29 March 2004
- Owner: Sun Ba Power Corporation
- Operator: Sun Ba Power Corporation

Thermal power station
- Primary fuel: Natural gas

Power generation
- Units operational: 4 (gas); 2 (steam); 4 (heat recovery steam)
- Make and model: Mitsubishi Heavy Industries, Toshiba, Babcock-Hitachi
- Nameplate capacity: 980 MW

The Sun Ba Power Plant or Fong Der Power Plant (traditional Chinese: 森霸電廠; simplified Chinese: 森霸电厂; pinyin: Sēnbà Diànchǎng) is a combined cycle gas-fired power plant in Shanshang District, Tainan, Taiwan. The installed capacity of the power plant is 980 MW.

== History ==
The power plant was commissioned on 29 March 2004. It has an IPP agreement with Taiwan Power Company for 25 years.

== See also ==
- List of power stations in Taiwan
- Electricity sector in Taiwan
