= Chaguan =

Chaguan may refer to:

- Chaguan people, an Indigenous people of South America
- Teahouse (Chinese: 茶馆; pinyin: cháguǎn), an establishment which primarily serves tea
- Teahouse (play) (Chinese: 茶馆; pinyin: cháguǎn), by Lao She, 1957
- Chaguan, a variety of Warao language

== See also ==
- Chaguang station, on the Shenzhen Metro
