= Taipower Exhibit Center in Southern Taiwan =

Science center in Hengchun, Pingtung County, Taiwan

- 台電南部展示館
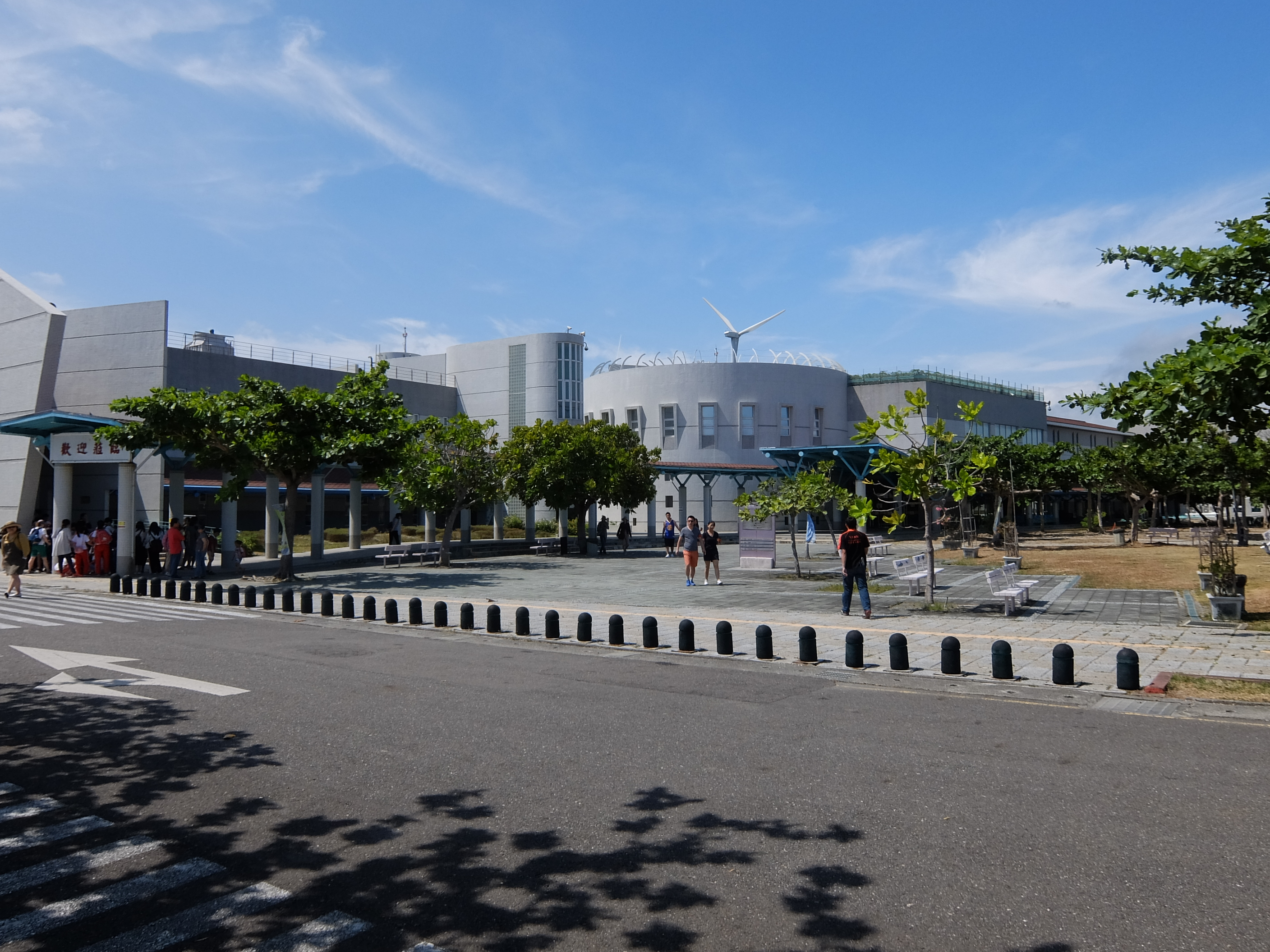
- Interactive map of the Taipower Exhibit Center in Southern Taiwan area

General information
- Type: science center
- Location: Hengchun, Pingtung County, Taiwan
- Coordinates: 21°56′57.0″N 120°44′39.8″E
- Opened: 31 August 2005
- Owner: Taiwan Power Company

The Taipower Exhibit Center in Southern Taiwan (simplified Chinese: 台电南部展示馆; traditional Chinese: 台電南部展示館; pinyin: Táidiàn Nánbù Zhǎnshì Guǎn) is a science center about Taiwan electricity sector in Hengchun Township, Pingtung County, Taiwan. The center is owned by Taiwan Power Company.

== History ==
The center was opened on 31 August 2005.

== Architecture ==
The center features exhibition hall, movie theater and an outdoor solar panel.

== Exhibitions ==
The center exhibits various information regarding electricity sectors in Taiwan, ranging from electric power overview, electricity generation, nuclear power, radioactive waste etc.

== See also ==
- List of tourist attractions in Taiwan
- List of science centers#Asia
