= Tainan Shan-Shang Garden and Old Waterworks Museum =

Museum in Shanshang, Tainan, Taiwan

- 山上花園水道博物館
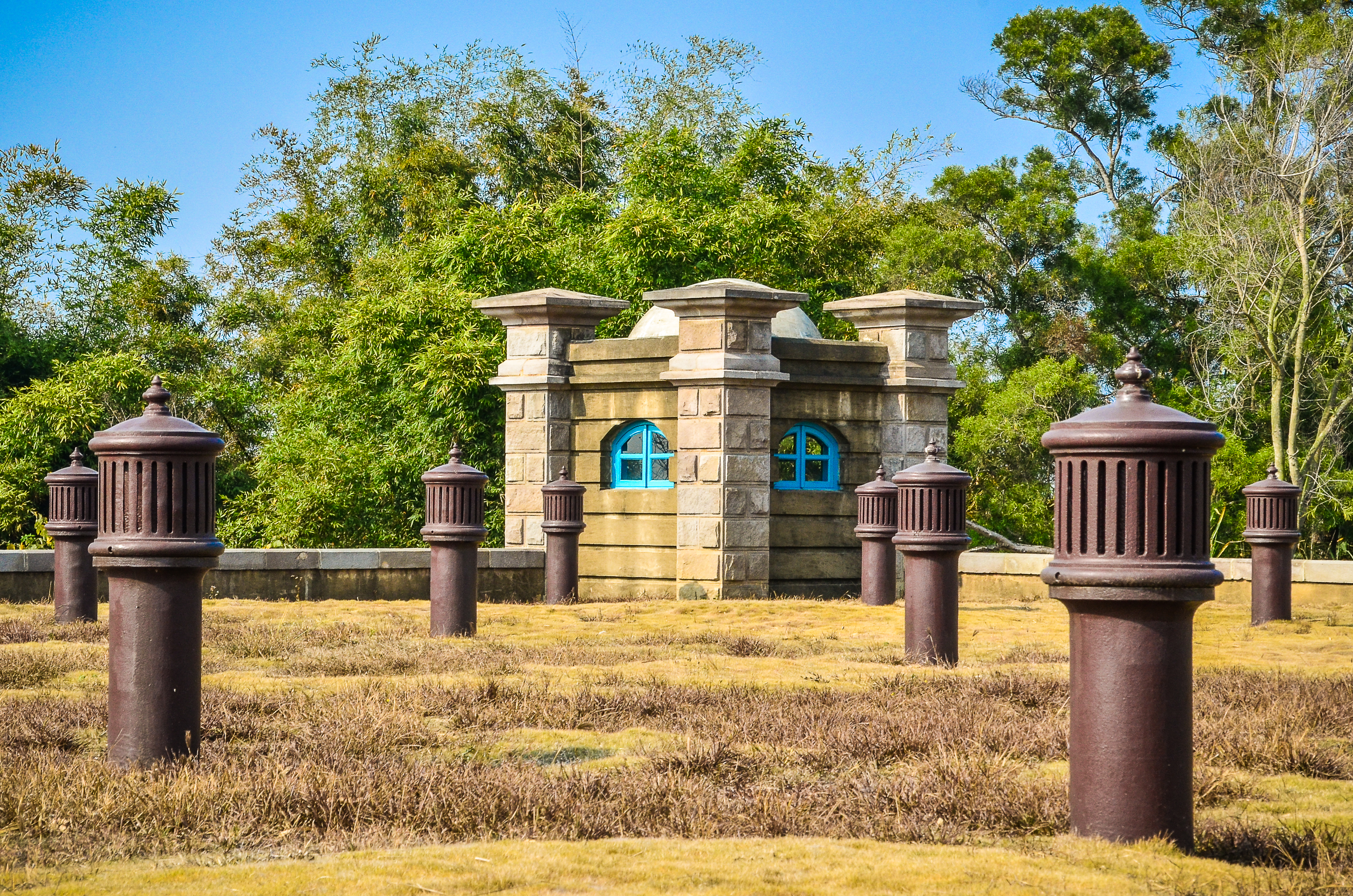
- Established: 10 October 2019
- Location: Shanshang, Tainan, Taiwan
- Coordinates: 23°05′20.7″N 120°21′29.9″E
- Type: museum
- Website: Official website

The Tainan Shan-Shang Garden and Old Waterworks Museum (traditional Chinese: 山上花園水道博物館; simplified Chinese: 山上花园水道博物馆; pinyin: Shānshàng Huāyuán Shuǐdào Bówùguǎn) is a museum in Shanshang District, Tainan, Taiwan.

== History ==
The museum used to be the old Tainan watercourse and water treatment plant. In 2005, the structure was declared a historic site. The museum opened to the public on 10 October 2019.

== Architecture ==
The museum complex spans an area of 20 hectares (0.01 km^{2}).

== See also ==
- List of museums in Taiwan
