= Zhuguang station =

Metro station in Shenzhen, China

Zhuguang 珠光
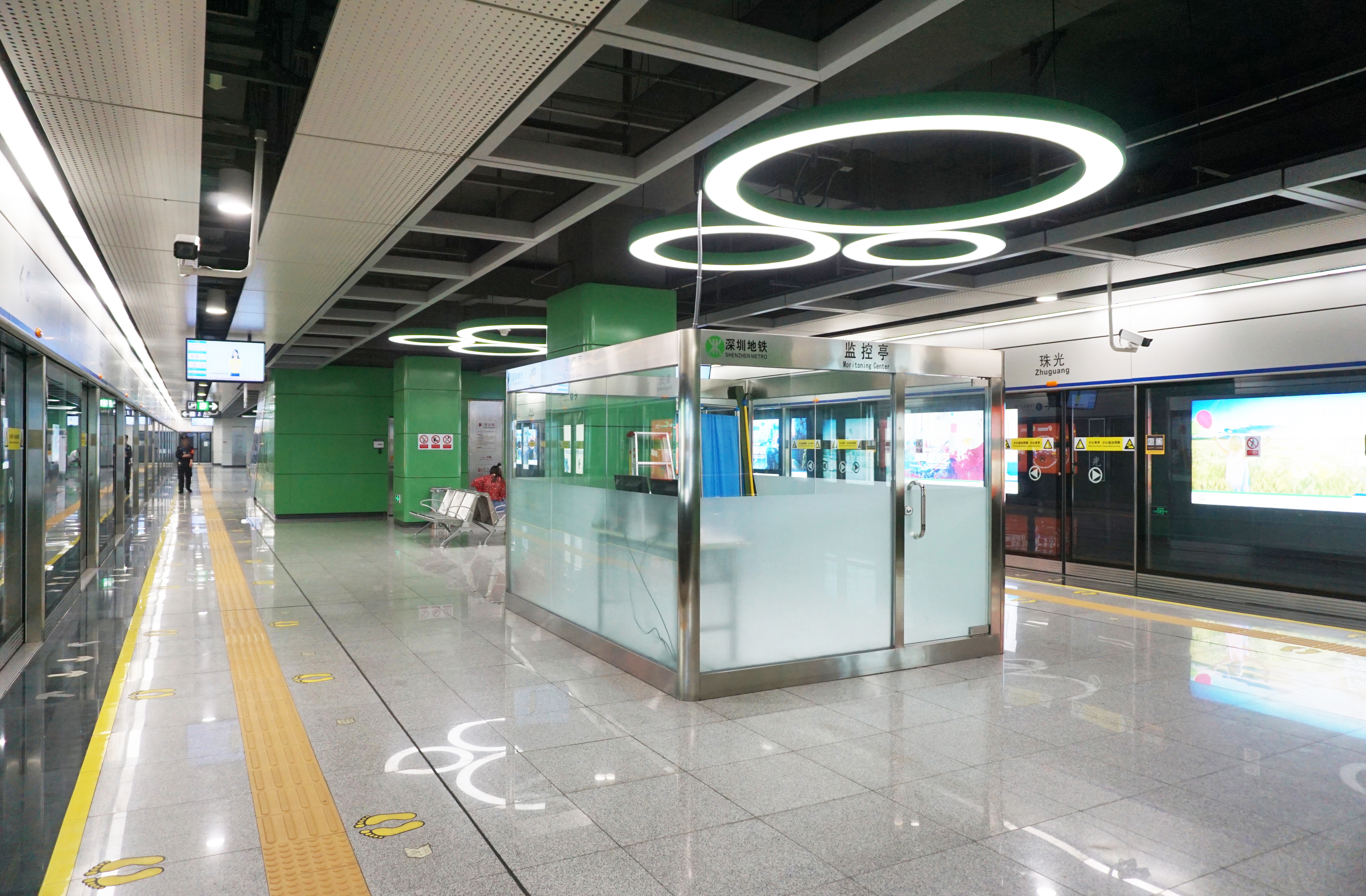
- Platform

General information
- Location: Nanshan District, Shenzhen, Guangdong; China
- Coordinates: 22°34′17″N 113°57′21″E
- Operated by: SZMC (Shenzhen Metro Group)
- Line: Line 7
- Platforms: 2 (1 island platform)
- Tracks: 2

Construction
- Structure type: Underground
- Accessible: Yes

History
- Opened: 28 October 2016 (9 years ago)

Services
Preceding station	Shenzhen Metro	Following station
Chaguang towards SZU Lihu Campus	Line 7	Longjing towards Tai'an
Location

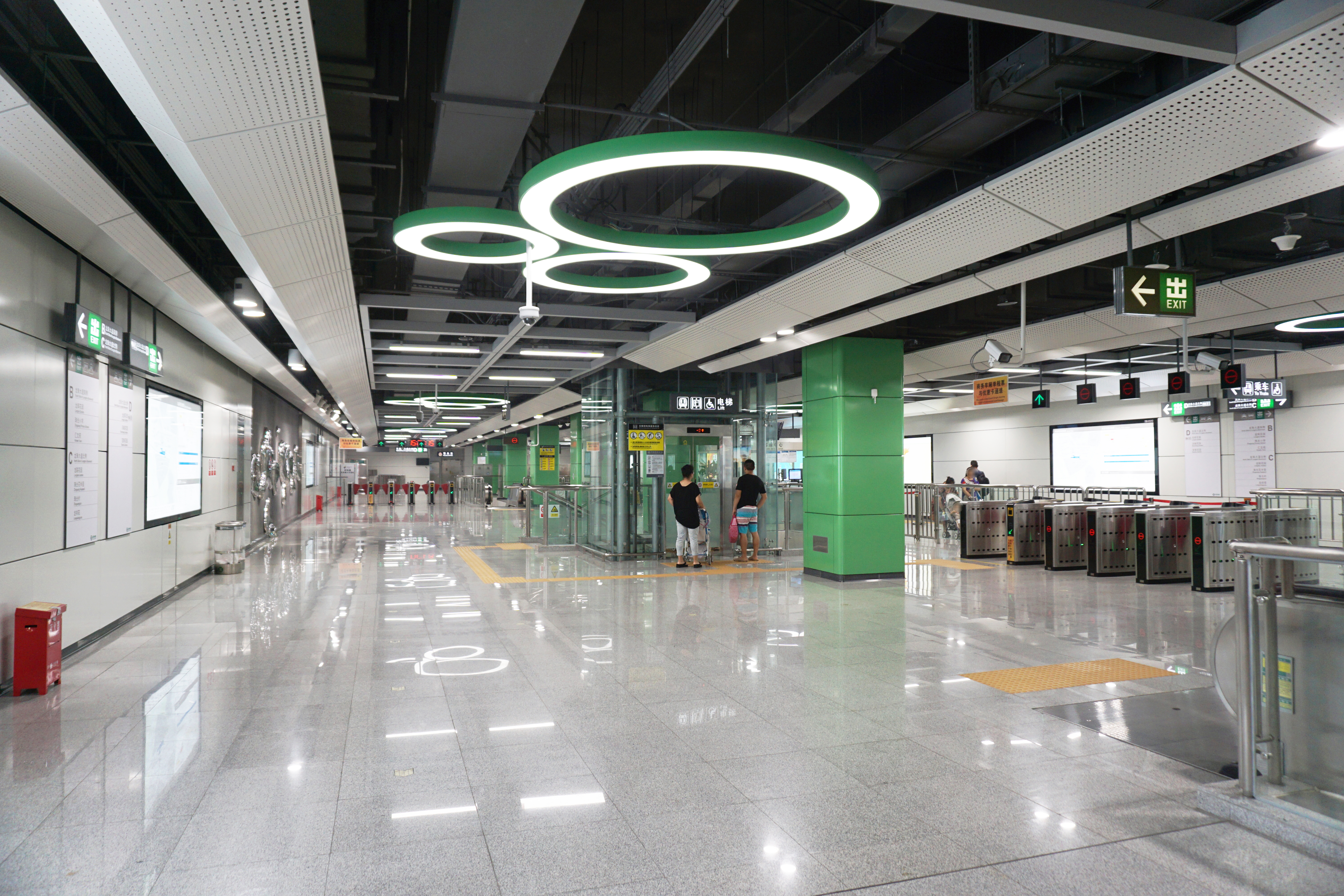
Concourse

Zhuguang (Chinese: 珠光; pinyin: Zhūguāng) is a metro station on Shenzhen Metro's Line 7. It opened on 28 October 2016.

== Station layout ==
G	-	Exits A-D
B1F; Concourse	Lobby	Ticket Machines, Customer Service, Shops, Vending Machines
B2F; Platforms	Platform	7 towards SZU Lihu Campus (Chaguang)
B2F; Platforms	Island platform, doors will open on the left
B2F; Platforms	Platform	7 towards Tai'an (Longjing)

== Exits ==
Exit	Destination
Exit A	Reserved Exit
Exit B	Longzhu Boulevard (S), Longhui Garden, Zhuguang Primary School, Huiwen Yuan
Exit C	Longzhu Boulevard (N), Longlian Garden, Zhuguang Huabanli, Zhuguangcun, Longxiangyuan
Exit D	Longzhu Boulevard (N), Longdu Garden, Runcheng Garden, Baozhu Garden
