= Shenyun station =

Shenzhen Metro station

Shenyun 深云
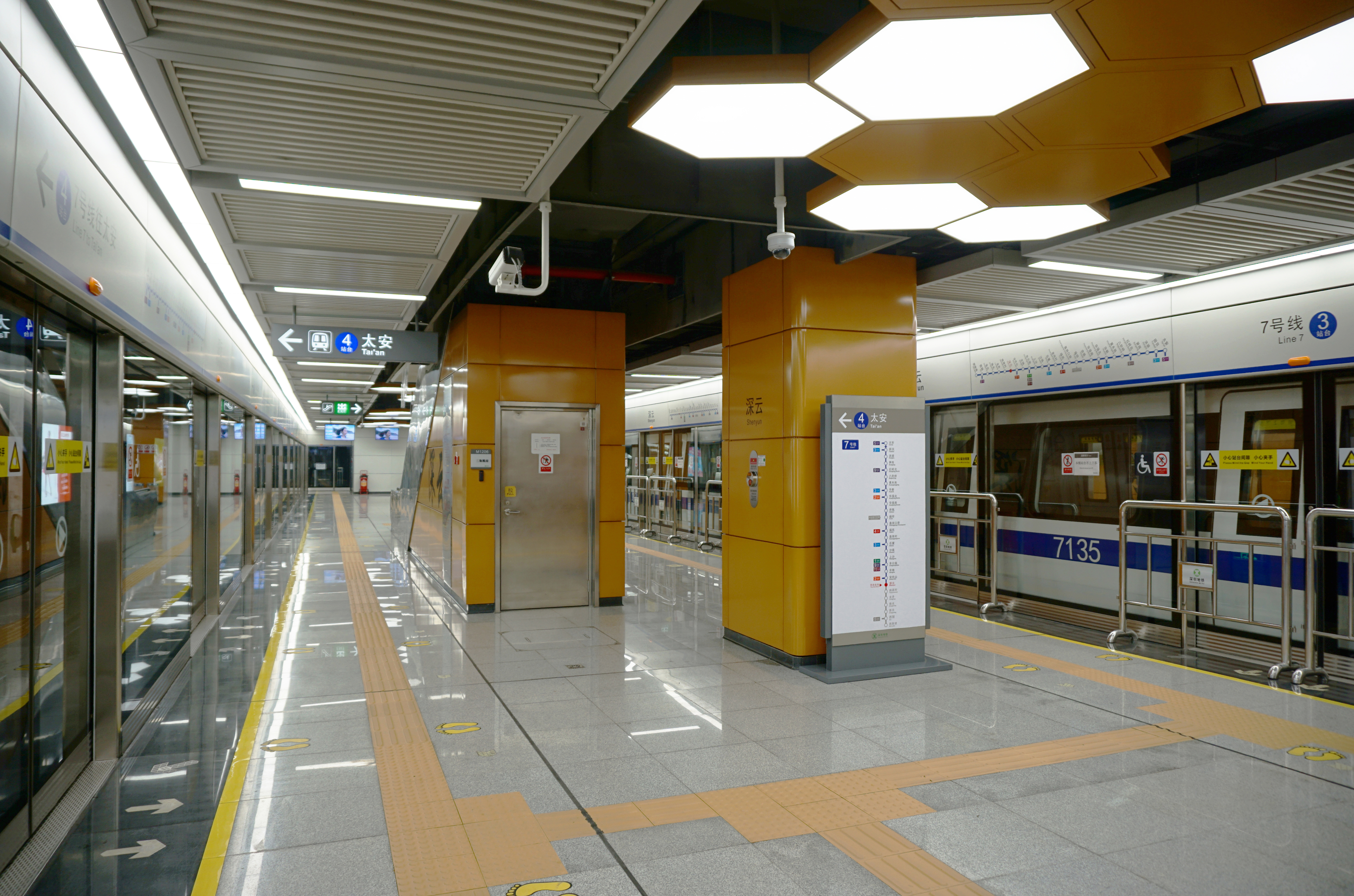
- Platform

General information
- Location: Nanshan District, Shenzhen, Guangdong; China
- Coordinates: 22°33′32″N 113°59′24″E
- Operated by: SZMC (Shenzhen Metro Group)
- Line: Line 7
- Platforms: 4 (2 island platforms)
- Tracks: 3

Construction
- Structure type: Underground
- Accessible: Yes

History
- Opened: 28 October 2016 (9 years ago)

Services
Preceding station	Shenzhen Metro	Following station
Taoyuancun towards SZU Lihu Campus	Line 7	Antuo Hill towards Tai'an
Wenti Park Terminus	Line 7 Branch	Terminus
Location

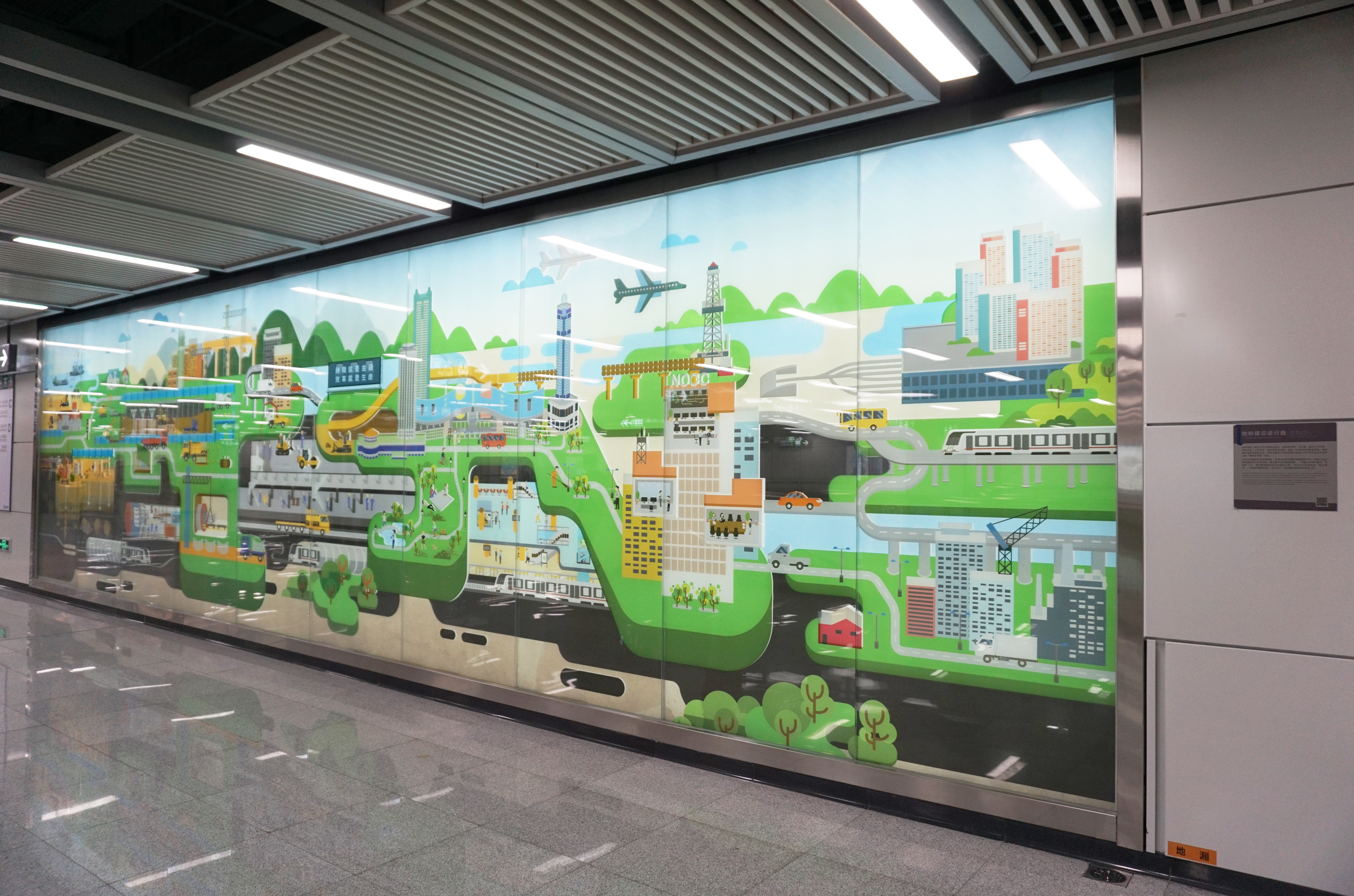
Art Wall - The March of the Metro Construction

Shenyun station (Chinese: 深云站; pinyin: Shēnyún Zhàn) is a station on Line 7 of the Shenzhen Metro. It opened on 28 October 2016.

== Station layout ==
G	-	Exits A-D
B1F; Concourse	Lobby	Ticket Machines, Customer Service, Shops, Vending Machines
B2F; Platforms	Platform	7 towards SZU Lihu Campus (Taoyuancun)
B2F; Platforms	Island platform, doors will open on the left or right
B2F; Platforms	Platform ↑ Platform ↓	7 towards Wenti Park (terminus) (Staff only)
B2F; Platforms	Island platform, doors will open on the left or right
B2F; Platforms	Platform'	7 towards Tai'an (Antuo Hill)

The center track is used for a staff-only shuttle which leads to the staff-only Wenti Park station in the depot, and is operated with a special 3-car train instead of the typical 6-car trains.

== Exits ==
Exit	Destination
Exit A	Beihuan Boulevard (Side Road)
Exit B	Beihuan Boulevard, Shenyuncun
Exit C	Beihuan Boulevard (N), Qiaocheng North Bus Depot
Exit D	Beihuan Boulevard (N), Shenzhen Metro Shenyun Depot, Xiangruiyuan
