= Electricity sector in Taiwan =

Electricity sector of Taiwan
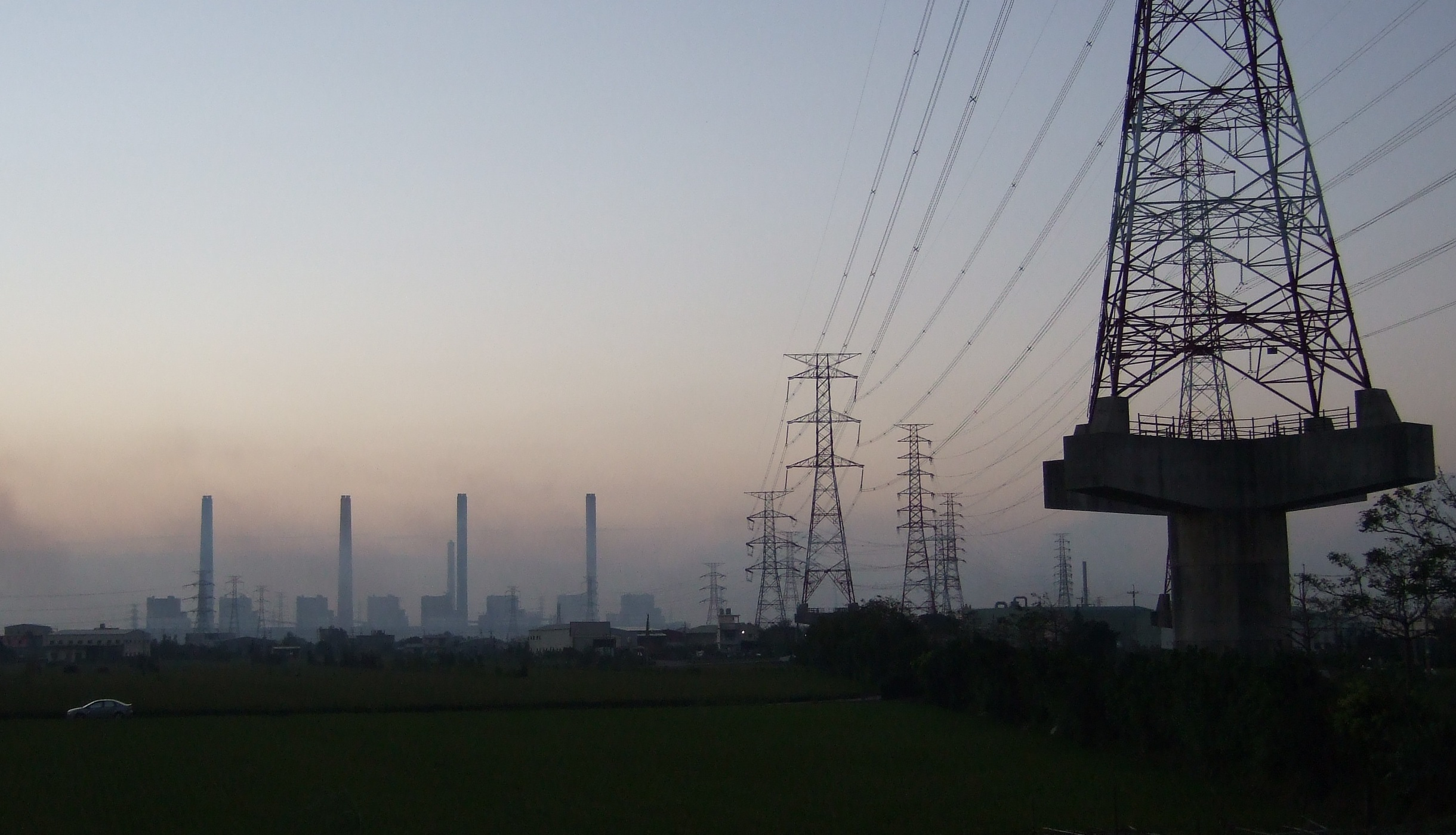

Data
- Installed capacity (2016): 49.06 GW

Consumption by sector (% of total)
- Residential: 18.2 (2017)
- Industrial: 54.0 (2017)
- Agriculture: 1.2 (2017)
- Commercial: 18.5 (2017)

Institutions
- Responsibility for transmission: Taiwan Power Company
- Responsibility for regulation: Taiwan Power Company
- Responsibility for policy-setting: Ministry of Economic Affairs

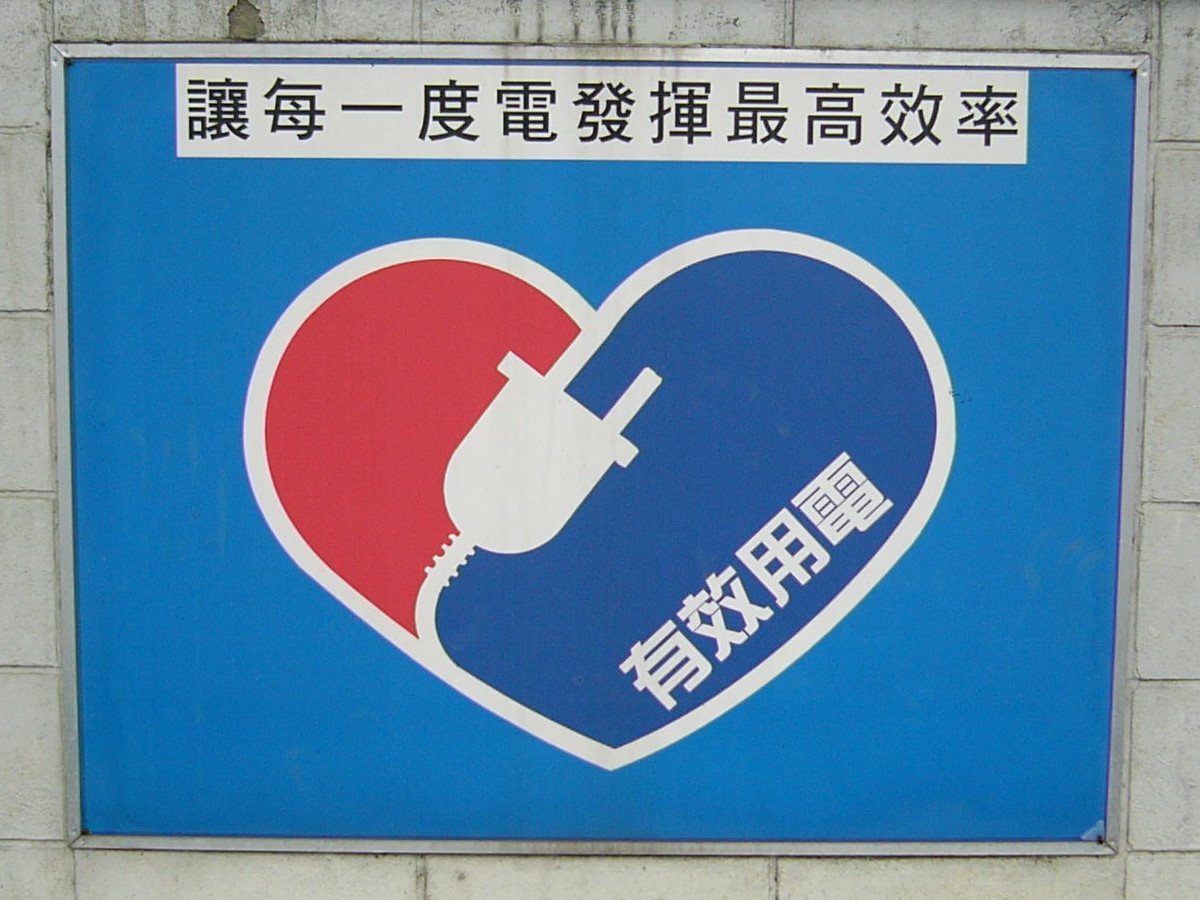
Logo promoting the use of electricity efficiently in Taiwan

The electricity sector in Taiwan ranges from generation, transmission, distribution and sales of electricity, covering Taiwan island and its offshore islands.

== Regulator ==
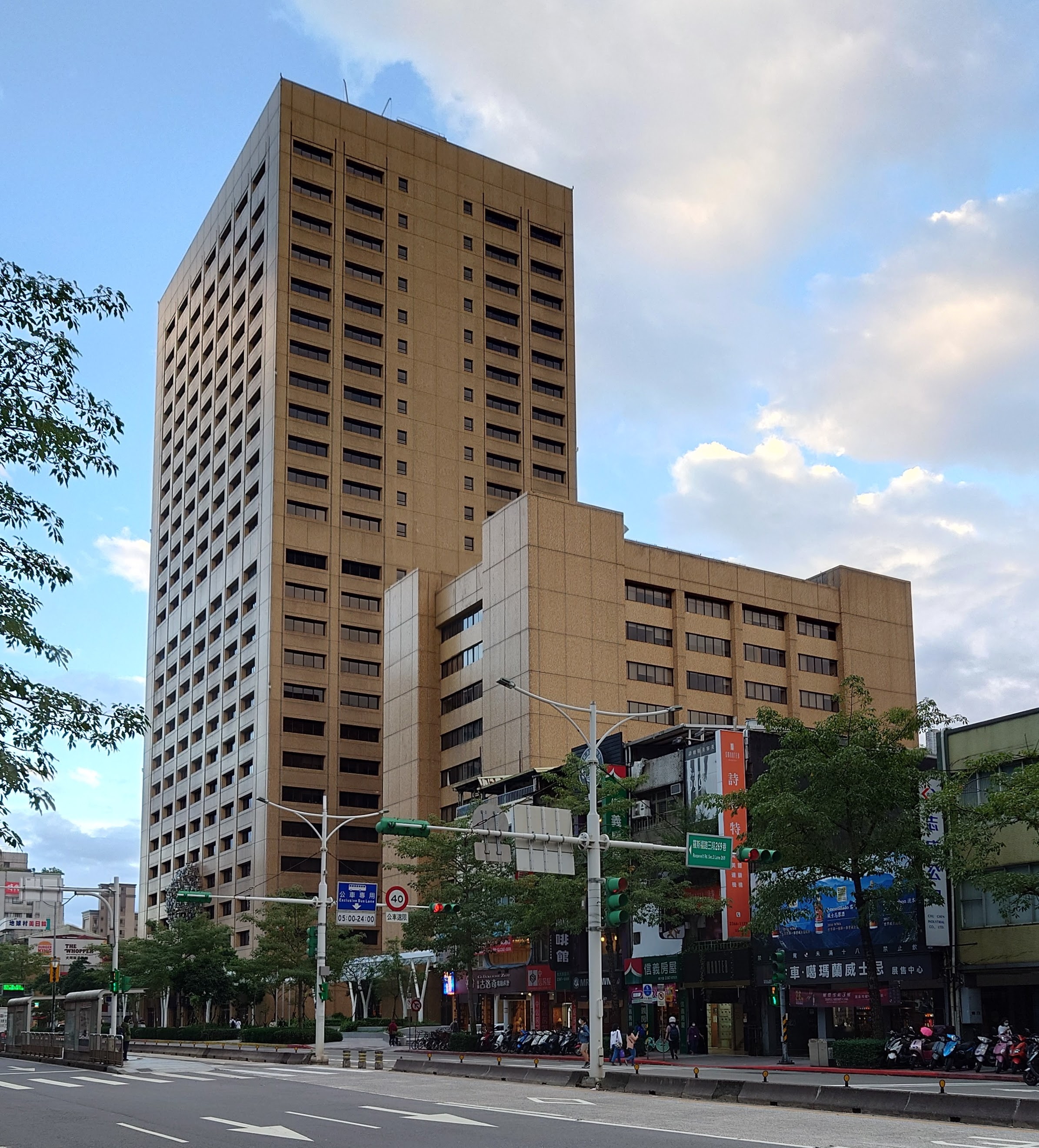
Taipower headquarter building in Taipei.

Electricity sector in Taiwan is regulated by its state-owned electric power utility company Taiwan Power Company (Taipower), established on 1 May 1946.

=== Independent power producers ===
After the liberalization of Taiwan electricity market in January 1995, there are total of 9 independent power producers in Taiwan up to date, which are:

- Ever Power IPP Co., Ltd.
- Ho-Ping Power Company
- Hsin Tao Power Corporation
- Mai-Liao Power Corporation
- Star Energy Power Corporation
- Sun Ba Power Corporation
- Chiahui Power Corporation
- Kuo Kuang Power Corporation
- Hsing Yuan Power Corporation (Star Buck Power Corporation)

== Generation ==
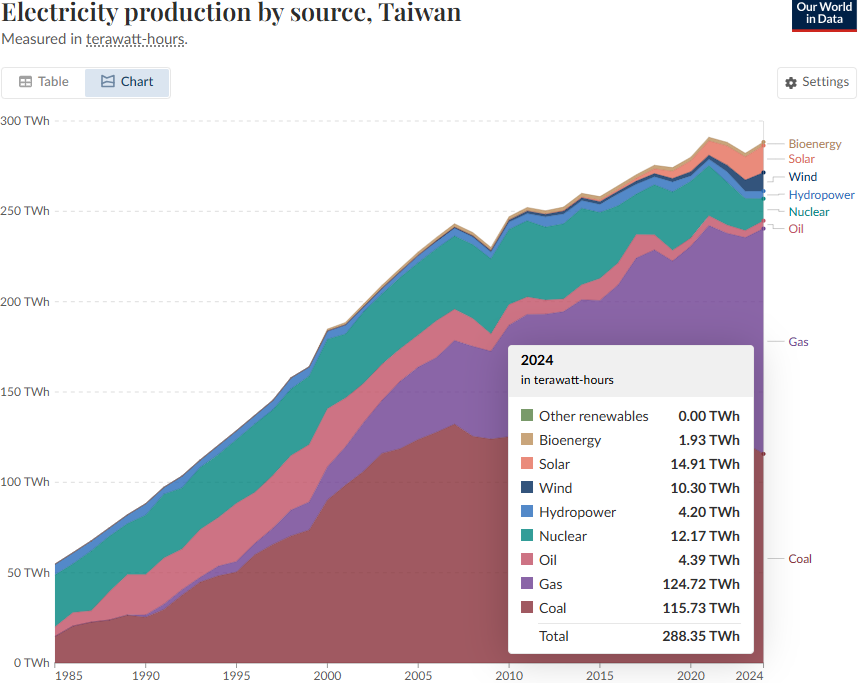
2024 TWh: Gas 124, Coal 115, Solar 15, Nuclear 12

=== Installed capacity ===
At the end of 2016, the total installed capacity of electricity in Taiwan was 49.06 GW, which came from coal-based thermal (34.73%), gas-based thermal (32.32%), nuclear (10.49%), renewable energy (9.10%), fuel-based thermal (8.06%) and pumped storage hydro (5.3%).

=== Power generation ===
Total power generation in 2017 was 270,279 GWh – which was supplied from coal (46.6%), natural gas (34.6%), nuclear (8.3%), renewables (4.6%), oil (4.7%), and pumped-storage hydro (1.2%).

In 2012, Taipower purchased electricity from nine Independent Power Producers with a total capacity of 7,652.1 MW. Taiwan has seen an annual growth of 4.4% in terms of electricity generation in 1992–2012.

In terms of the price to produce electricity, the average generation cost of electricity in Taiwan was US$7.0 cent/kWh, which consists of US$1.9 cent/kWh for nuclear, US$5.8 cent/kWh for coal and US$11.25 cent/kWh for natural gas.

Taipower operates three types of power plant based on the generation characteristics, which are peaking power plant, load following power plant and base load power plant.

In 2012, the base load power sources constituted 42.4% of the total power generation in Taiwan, below the expected level of 55–65%. Over the past decade, the capacity of peak load energy sources was between 10.3 and 14.8%, slightly lower than the expected 10–15% value.

=== Power plants ===
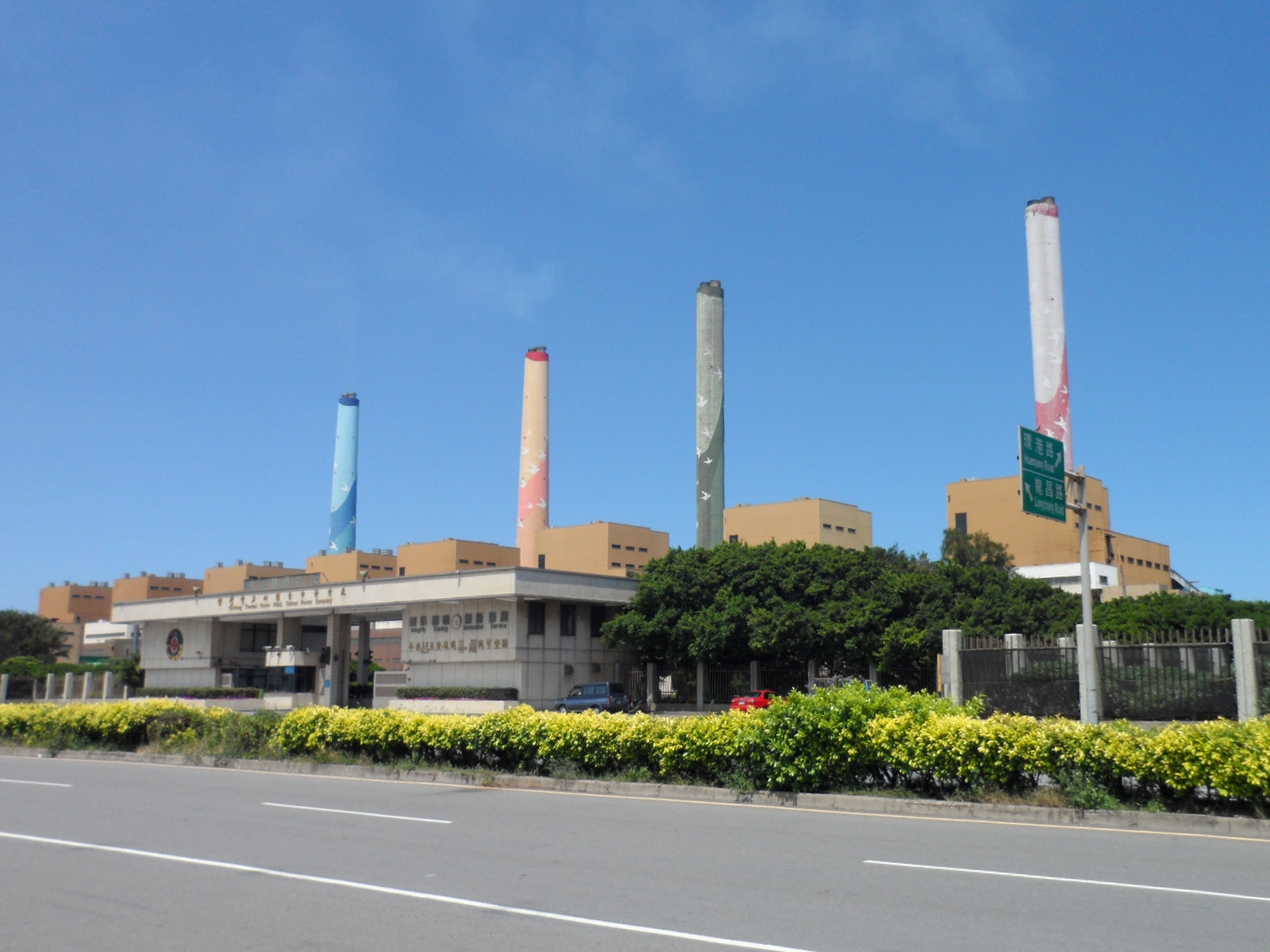
Taichung Power Plant in Taichung.

As of 2007, Taiwan had a total of 78 power plants, which are 39 hydro power plants, 27 thermal power plants, 9 wind farms and 3 nuclear power plants.

==== World records ====
Taiwan is home to Taichung Power Plant, the world's fourth largest coal-fired power plant with a 5,500 MW installed capacity, with an additional 324 MW from its gas turbines and wind turbines. The power plant is located in Longjing District, Taichung. The plant is also the largest power plant in Taiwan.

The Tatan Power Plant in Guanyin, Taoyuan is the world's largest combined cycle gas turbine power plant with a capacity of 4,419 MW.

==== Efficiency ====
In 2013, for steam turbine-based power plants, the plants have 31.89% for oil-fired plants, 35.71% for coal-fired plants and 30.93% for gas-fired plants of efficiency. The power plants also have efficiency of 37.17% for diesel engine plants, 25.08% for gas turbine plants and 44.78% for combined cycle plants.

=== Reserved margin ===
Taiwan set the operating reserve margin between power availability and power demand to be 6% minimum. Any value below that number would trigger an alert. Once the reserve margin falls below the 900 MW alert level, power rationing will be put into place.

In 2014, the reserve margin of electricity in Taiwan was 14.7%, in 2015 it fell to 10.4%. On 19 October 2016, it fell to 2.38% which is below the 900 MW threshold value, triggering the warning.

== Transmission and distribution ==
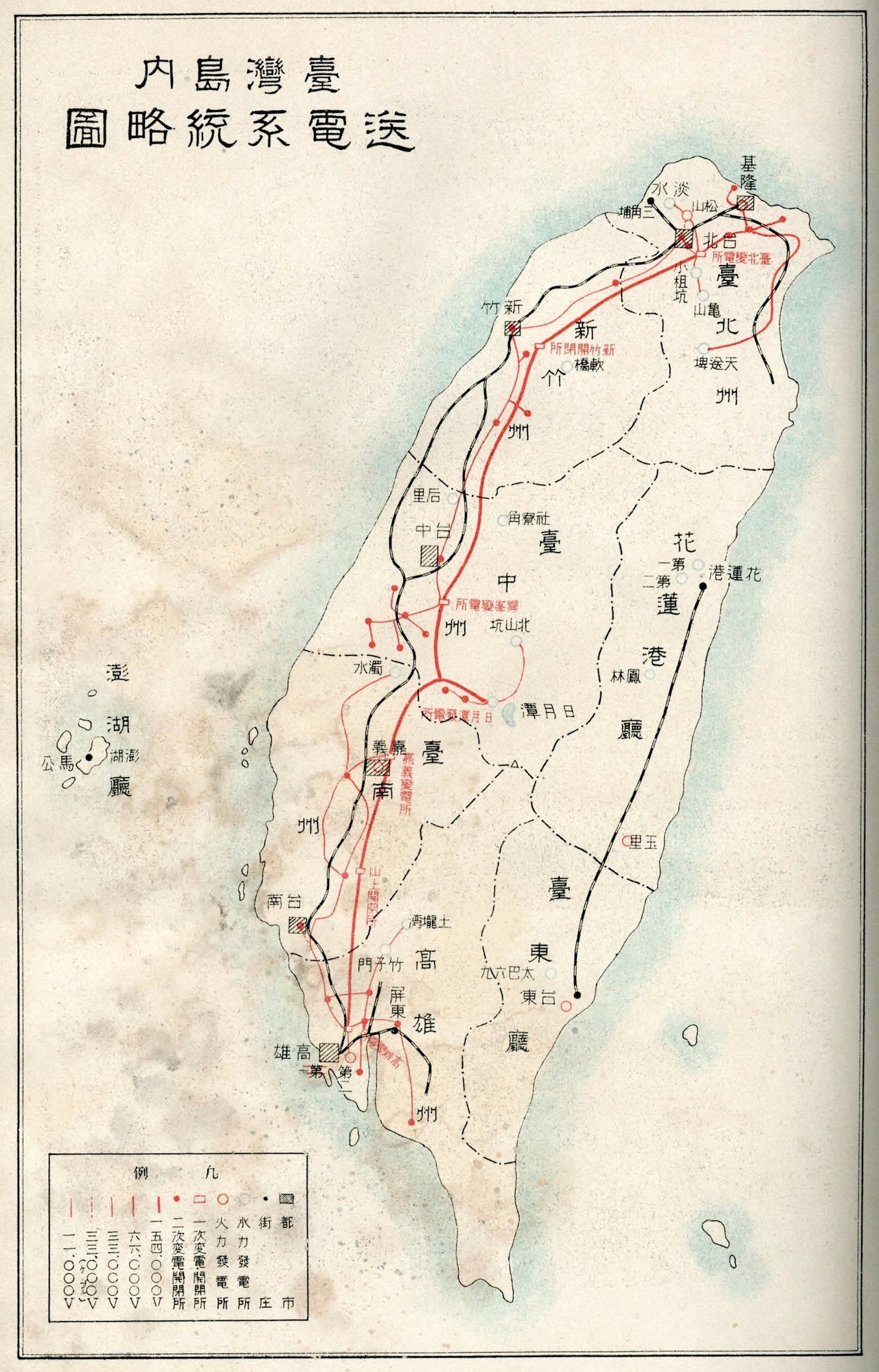
Electricity transmission in Taiwan in 1934.

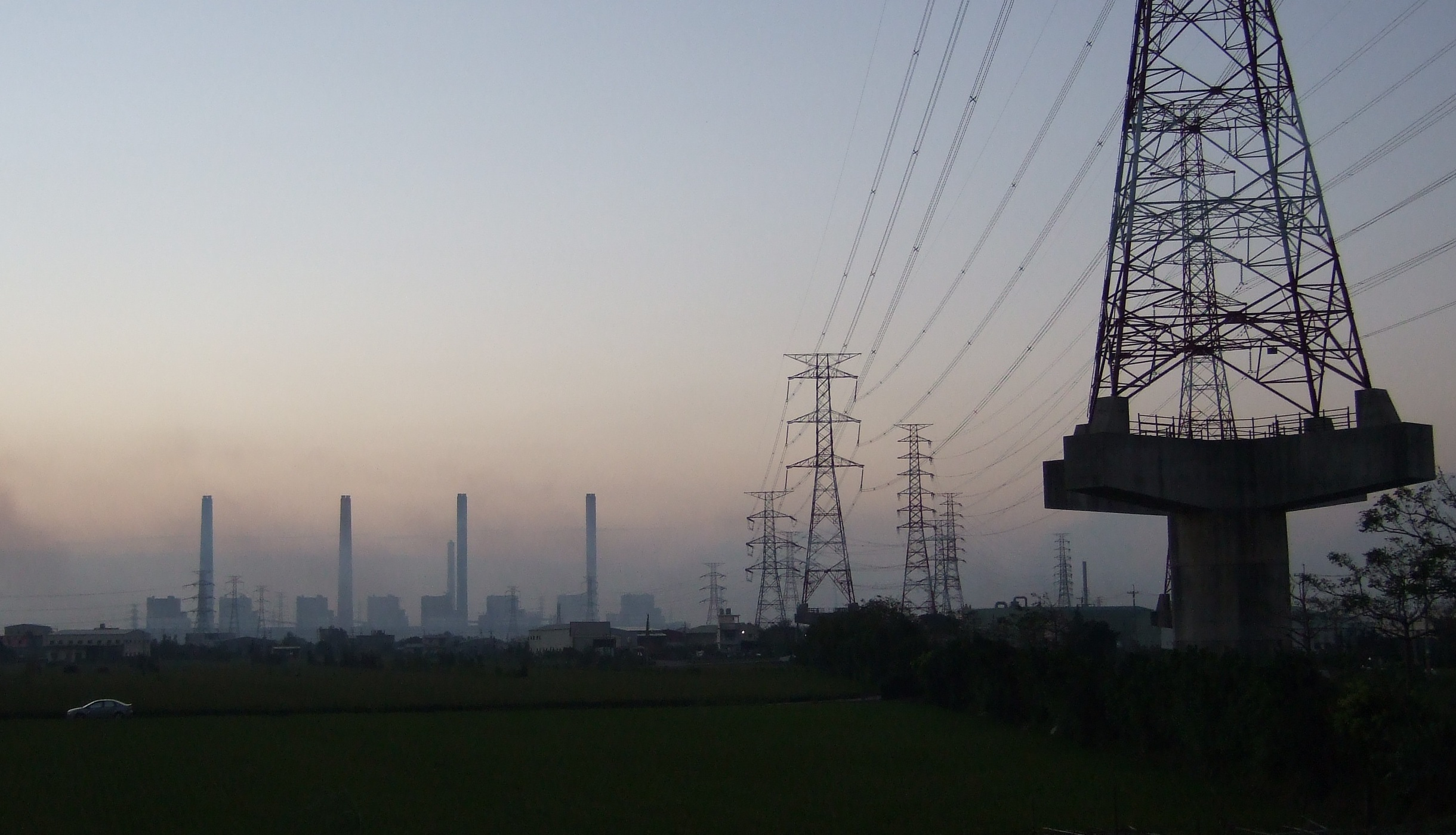
Electricity transmission line in Taichung.

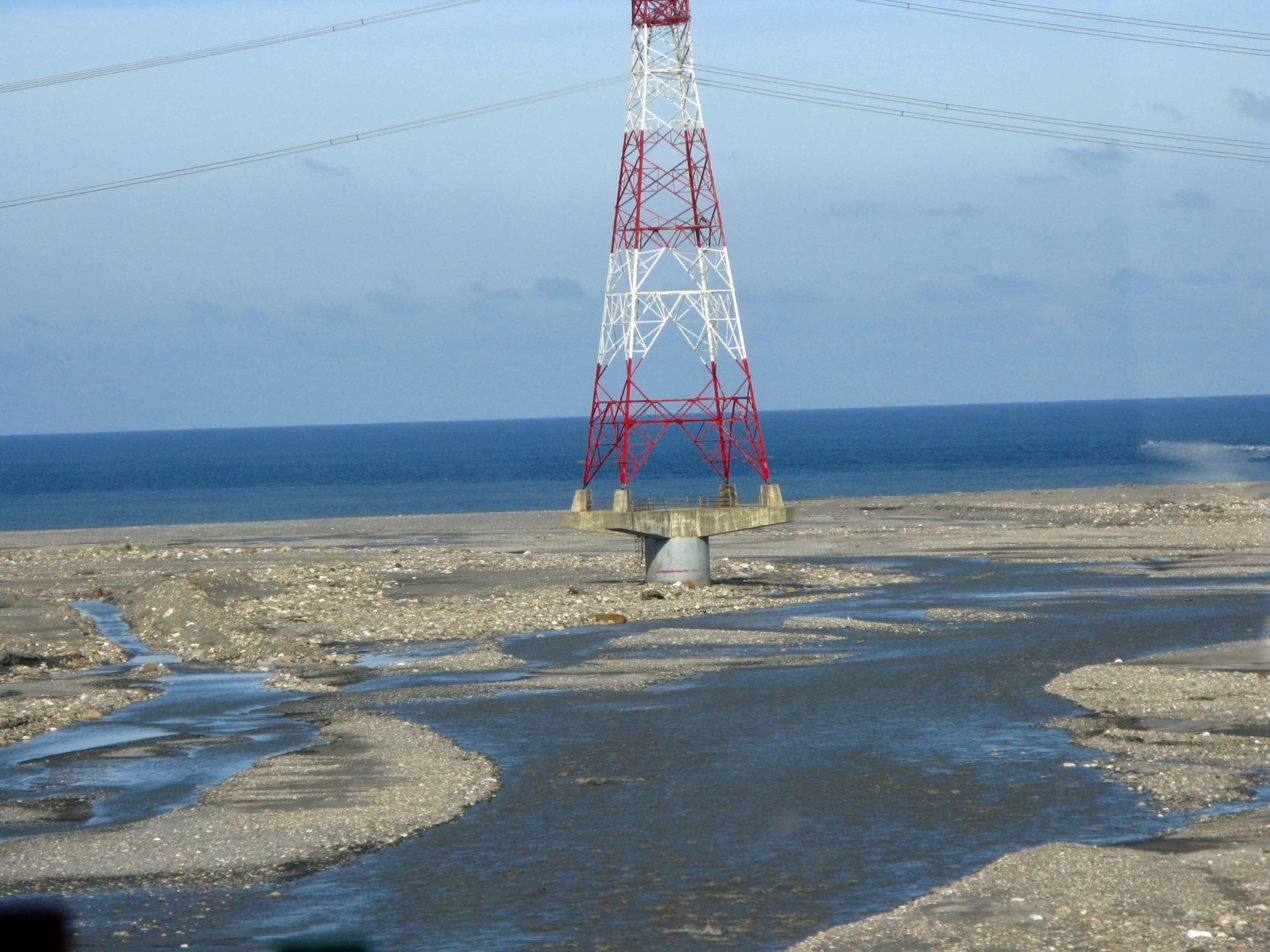
Electricity transmission line river crossing in Yunlin County.

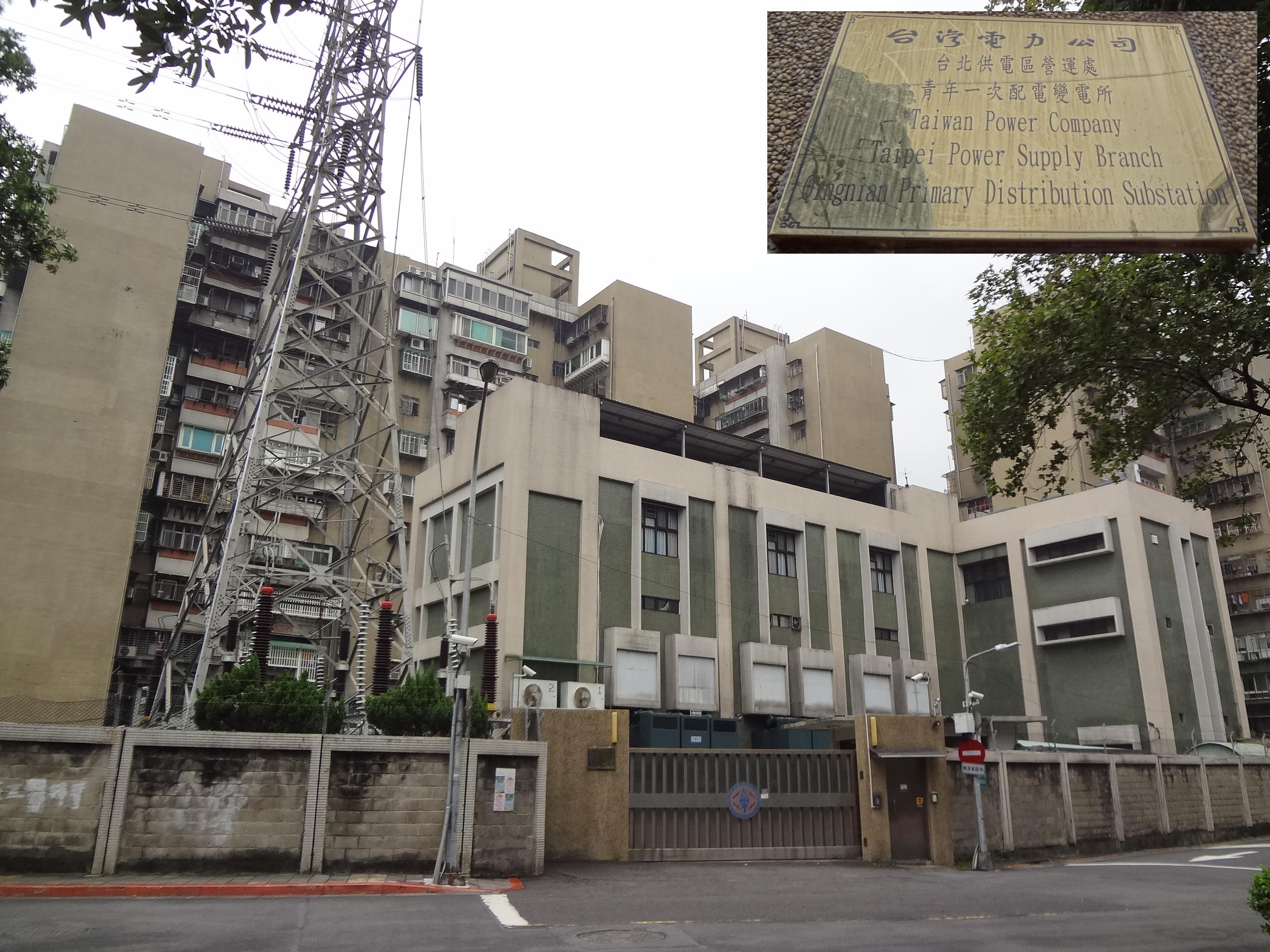
Primary Substation in Taipei.

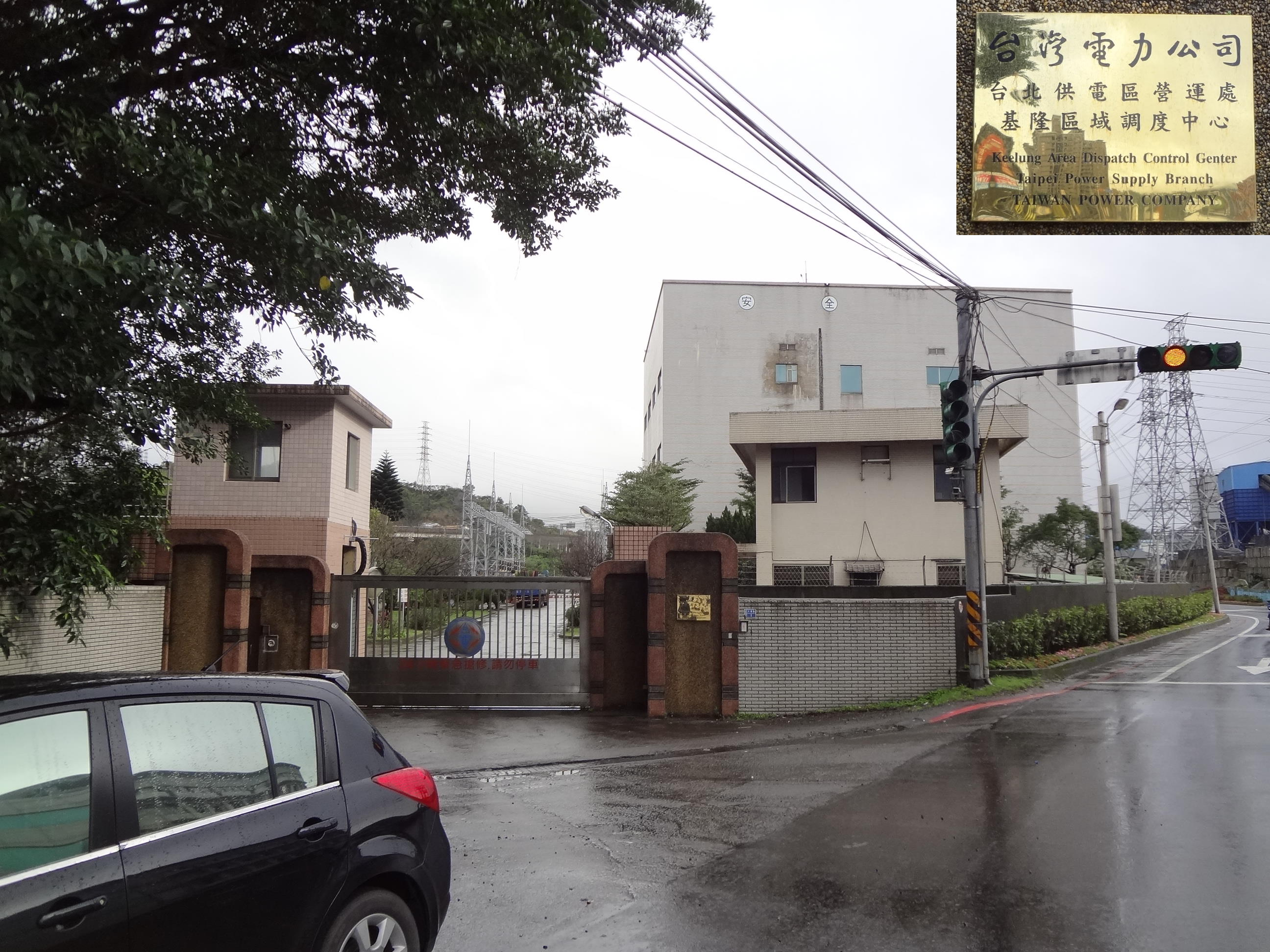
Dispatch center in Keelung.

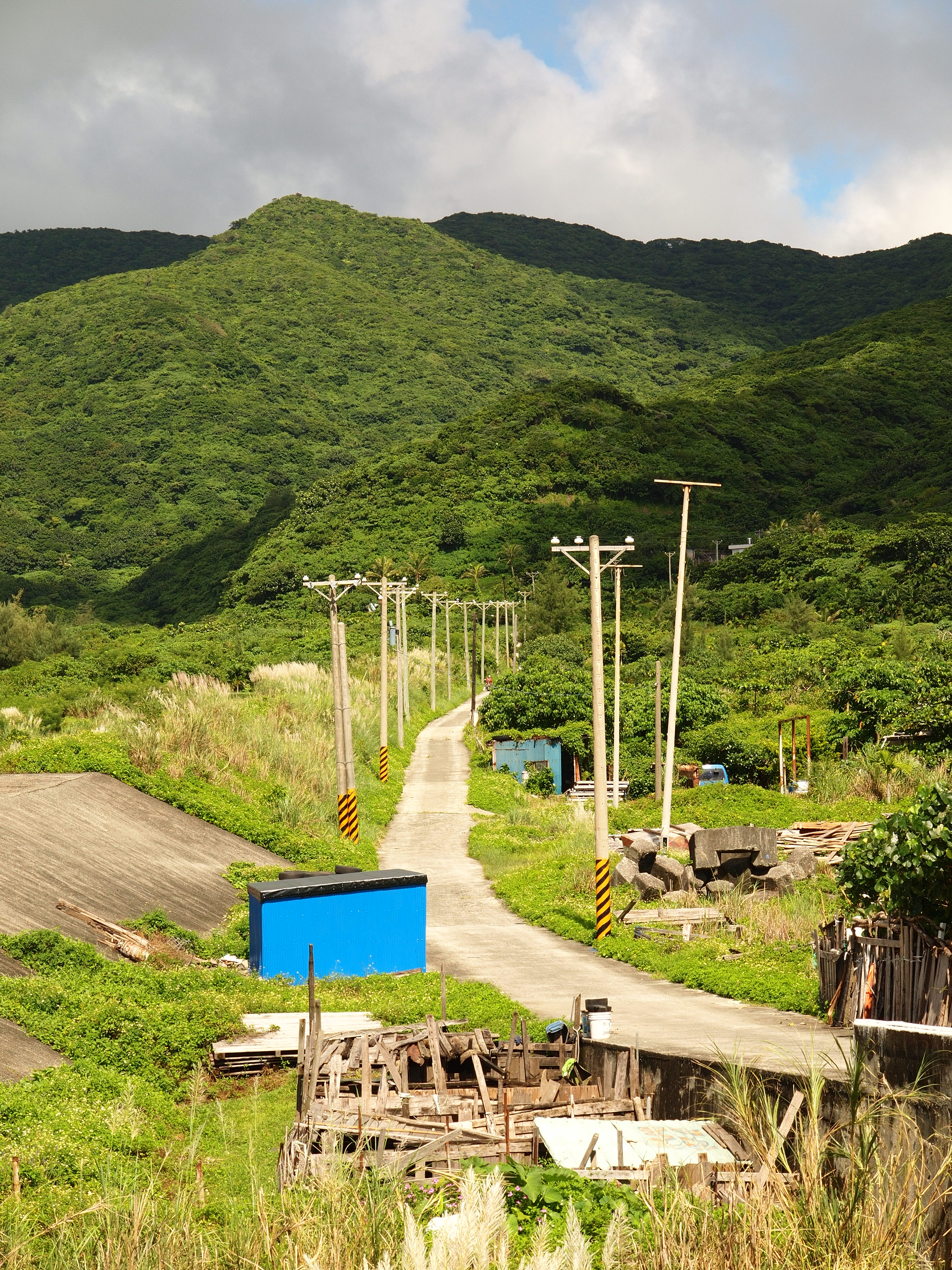
Electricity distribution line in Orchid Island, Taitung County.

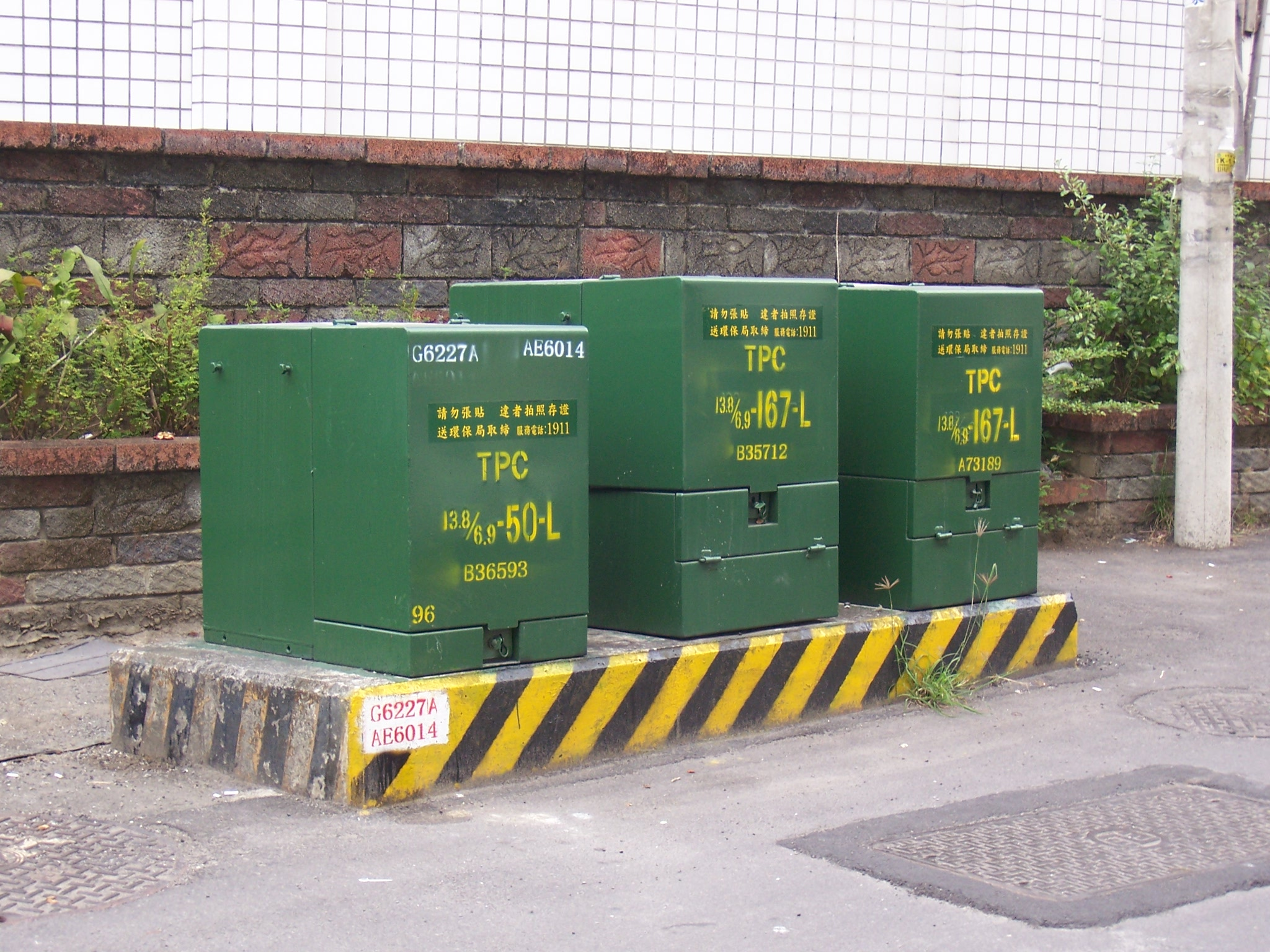
Distribution transformers.

=== Transmission and distribution lines ===
As of end of 2013, Taiwan owned a total of 17,054 km length of transmission line with the voltage levels of the transmission system are 345 kV and 161 kV. All of the transmission lines are fully owned by Taipower. The total length of the distribution line is 351,474 km and it goes up deep as the 4th level for underground distribution.

Currently, Taipower is implementing the 6-year 7th Power Transmission and Substation Project starting January 2010 until December 2015 with a total investment of NT$238.9 billion. The project will complete a new and expanded section of transmission lines running 2,370 km, a group of 130 substations and an expanded main transformer capacity of 23,560 MVA.

=== Substations and distribution system ===
As of end of 2013, there were 598 substations within Taiwan's electrical grid, which consist of 29 EHV substations, 275 primary substations and 294 secondary substations with a capacity of 58,500 MVA, 71,480 MVA and 22,127 MVA respectively. Around 70% of its distribution system has been fully automated.

=== Smart grid ===
Taipower allocated US$800 million worth of investment for the development of distribution automation and smart substations. In 2007, Taipower completed a smart grid roadmap for the future 20 years. It contains three phases, which are short term, medium term and long term. It also targets four areas, namely power grid safety and reliability, energy efficiency, customer service quality and integration of distributed power sources.

=== Losses ===
In 2013, Taiwan's line losses accounted for 7,290.9 GWh or 2.96% of total domestic consumption.

== Load ==
=== Rating ===
At the customers end, electricity in Taiwan uses 110 V and 60 Hz.

=== Peak load ===
The peak load in Taiwan's electrical grid was 33,957 MW in 2013 and 34,820 MW in 2014. It is predicted that the peak load will reach 43,010 MW in 2026. On 2 July 2015 at 1:48 p.m. local time, electricity load instantaneously reached its highest peak ever in Taiwan history at 35,380 MW. On 6 July 2015, the peak load record was broken when electricity consumption reached 35,560 MW at 1:45 p.m. local time, pushing the reserve margin to an alarming low of 3.07%.

Historical peak load in Taiwan
Date	Time	Peak load
15 July 2014	1:40 p.m.	35,090 MW
2 July 2015	1:48 p.m.	35,380 MW
6 July 2016	1:45 p.m.	35,560 MW
27 July 2016	1:46 p.m.	35,821 MW
28 July 2016	1:43 p.m.	36,199 MW

=== Electricity consumption ===
In the past decade (as of 2023) total energy consumption has grown in Taiwan almost every year from 211.71 TWh in 2012 to 248.81 TWh in 2021. The per capita electricity consumption in 2012 was 10,424 kWh. As of 2015, electricity consumption was projected to grow by 1.9% annually. Northern Taiwan consumes 40% of the total power generated in Taiwan, and it generally imports power transmitted from Central Taiwan and Southern Taiwan.

=== Customers ===
In 2012, there were a total of almost 13 millions of electricity customers in Taiwan, ranging from residential (89.4%), commercials (7.6%), industrial (1.6%) and others (1.4%).

=== Electricity metering ===
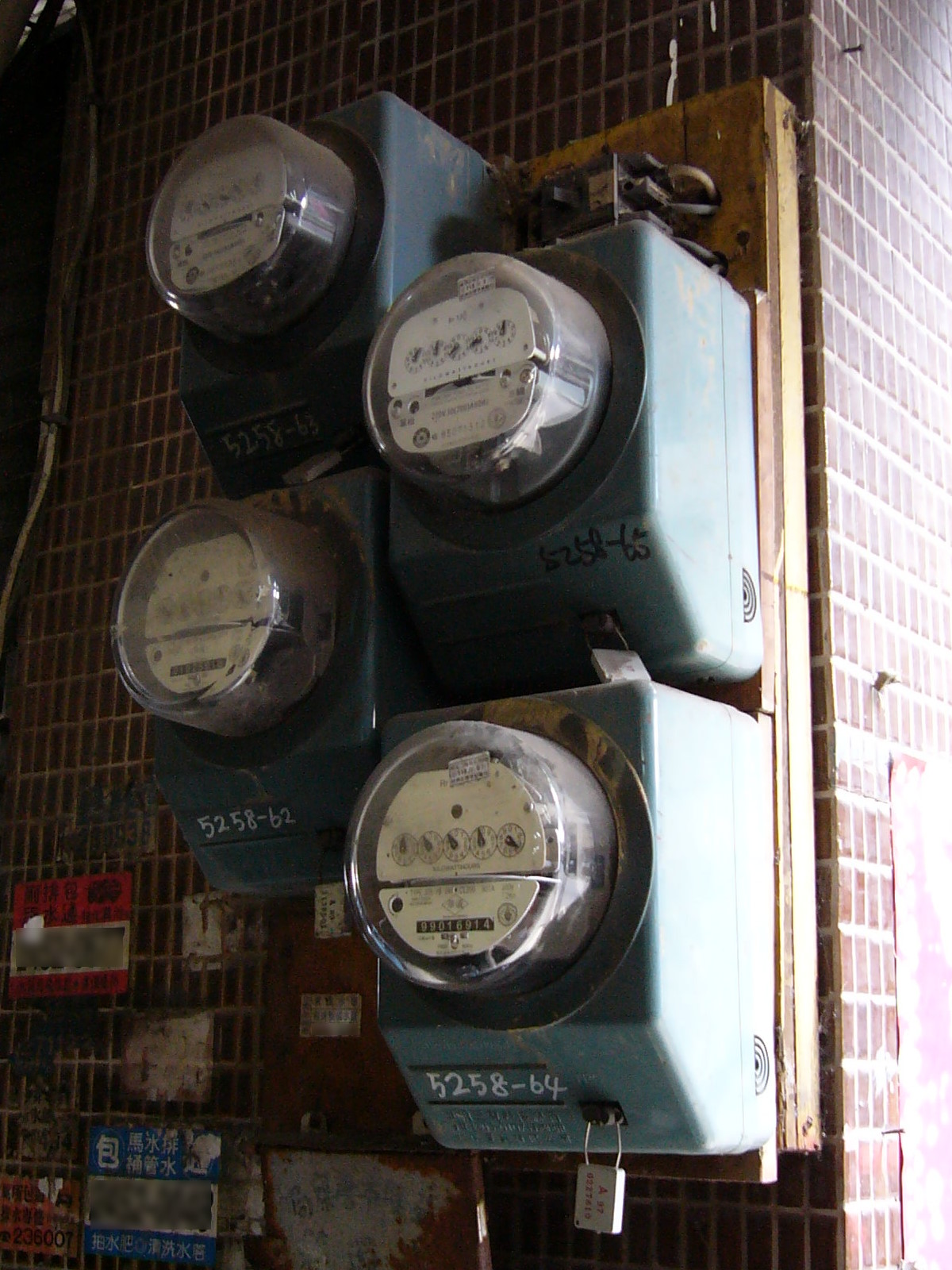
Taipower customer kWh meters

Taiwan implements the usage of advanced metering infrastructure (AMI) as one of the demand side management strategy to cut down energy consumption and upgrade energy usage efficiency with a total investment of US$2.74 billion. The Bureau of Energy of the Ministry of Economic Affairs instructed Taipower to conduct AMI installations on 23,600 high voltage customers and 10,000 low voltage customers in 2012. As of the end of 2011, Taipower has completed the 1,200 AMI installations for 1,200 high voltage customers.

=== Electricity saving ===
To encourage the public for energy and electricity saving, Taipower continued to launch the Power-Saving Initiative Measures and Energy Conservation Competitions to encourage the public to save electricity. After the measures were taken in 2012, a total amount of 4.833 TWh of electricity was saved in that year with carbon dioxide reduction reaching 2.59 million tons.

In October 2016, due to the reduced reserve capacity of Taipower because of the continuing hot weather, the Executive Yuan ordered government offices around Taiwan reduce power usage between 12:00 and 14:00, especially air conditioners and lights.

=== Electricity rationing ===
Taipower uses a five-point color scale to indicate the level of electricity reserve at a given moment. Green indicates a reserve margin of more than 10% of total power generation, yellow indicates a margin between 6–10%, orange indicates a margin below 6%, red indicates a margin of less than 900 MW, and black indicates a margin of less than 500 MW initiating electricity rationing. Since 1988, Taiwan has experienced 57 rationing events with the most recent occurrence in 2002.

In the event of power rationing, Taipower would first reduce the power supply to business customers with loads more than 5 MW by 5%, followed by a 5% reduction to those consuming between 1–5 MW if problem persists. Rationing would be increased to 10–15% if the reserve continues to drop. If problem still continues, rationing would be imposed to business and households with loads less than 1 MW.

=== Electricity tariff ===
For the customers end, the current tariff of electricity before tax in 2013 is NT$3.1165/kWh for lighting and NT$2.8020/kWh for power. Summer electricity rates is imposed to customers during summer seasons between June and September every year for usage more than 400 kWh per month.

=== Blackout ===
The largest power outage in Taiwan due to a storm occurred on 9 August 2015 when Typhoon Soudelor hit the island, leaving 4.85 million households without electricity.

On 15 August 2017 at 4:52 p.m., six generators of Tatan Power Plant in Guanyin District, Taoyuan City fully tripped due to operation technical error, disrupting the supply of 4 GW of electricity. The outage hit northern half of Taiwan Island, affecting 6.68 million households.

=== Efficiency ===
In 2015, Taiwan ranked 2nd worldwide among 189 for providing electricity to users in an efficient manner in the category of Getting Electricity in the Doing Business 2016 rankings released by the World Bank.

== Security ==
On 17 September 2019, Taipower signed an agreement with Investigation Bureau of the Ministry of Justice on digital security of their operating system.

== Tourism ==
Tourism-purpose electrical-related objects in Taiwan are:

- Cijin Wind Turbine Park in Cijin District, Kaohsiung
- Taipower Exhibit Center in Northern Taiwan in Wanli District, New Taipei
- Taipower Exhibit Center in Southern Taiwan in Hengchun Township, Pingtung County
- Tower of Light in Sanmin District, Kaohsiung

== See also ==
- Energy in Taiwan
- Energy security
- Net Capacity Factor
- Renewable energy in Taiwan
- Nuclear power in Taiwan
- List of power stations in Taiwan
- Taiwan Power Company
- List of electricity sectors
