= Longjing station (Shenzhen Metro) =

Metro station in Shenzhen, China

Longjing 龙井
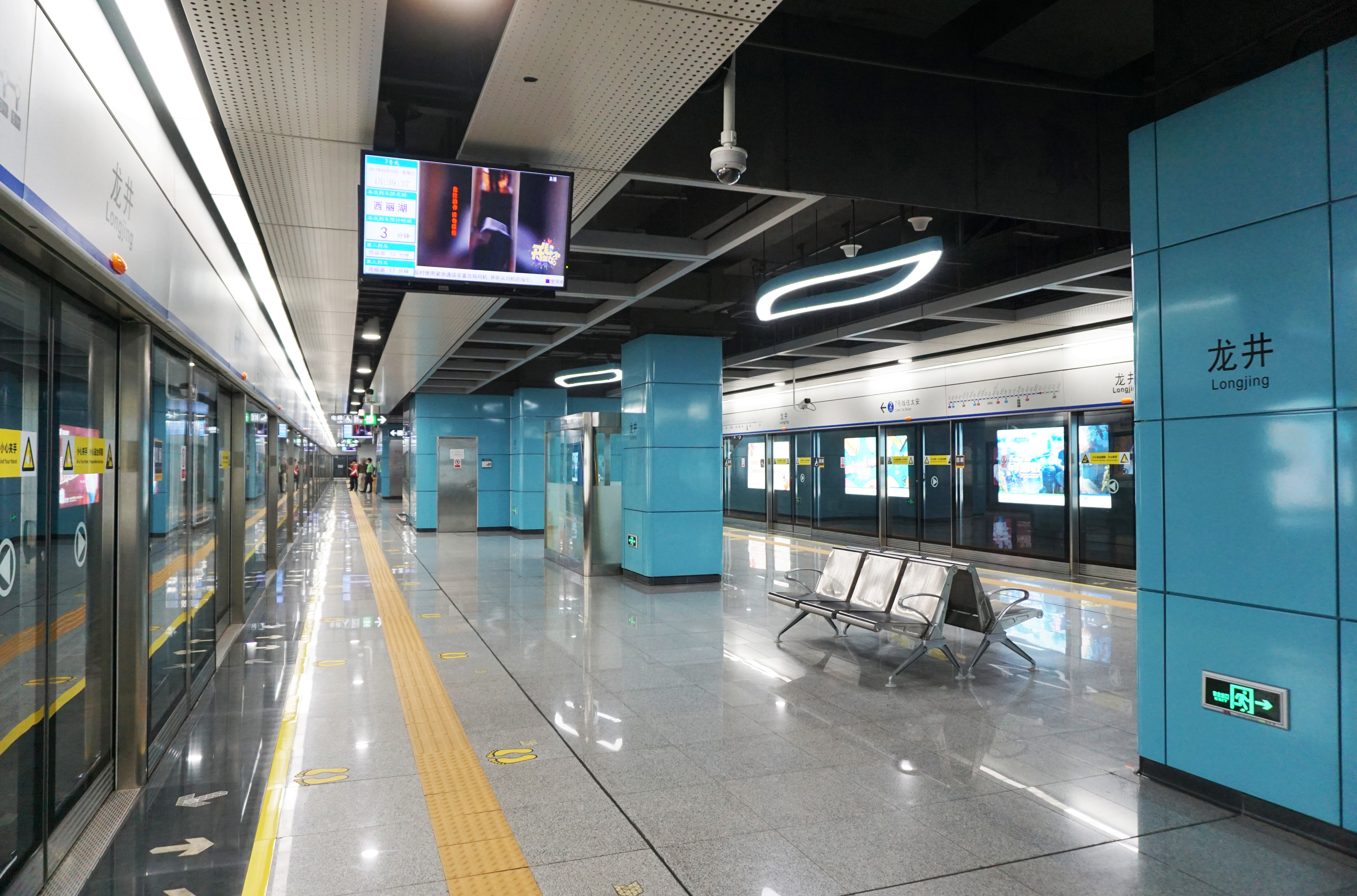
- Platform

General information
- Location: Nanshan District, Shenzhen, Guangdong; China
- Coordinates: 22°34′02″N 113°58′11″E
- Operated by: SZMC (Shenzhen Metro Group)
- Line: Line 7
- Platforms: 2 (1 island platform)
- Tracks: 2

Construction
- Structure type: Underground
- Accessible: Yes

History
- Opened: 28 October 2016 (9 years ago)

Services
Preceding station	Shenzhen Metro	Following station
Zhuguang towards SZU Lihu Campus	Line 7	Taoyuancun towards Tai'an
Location

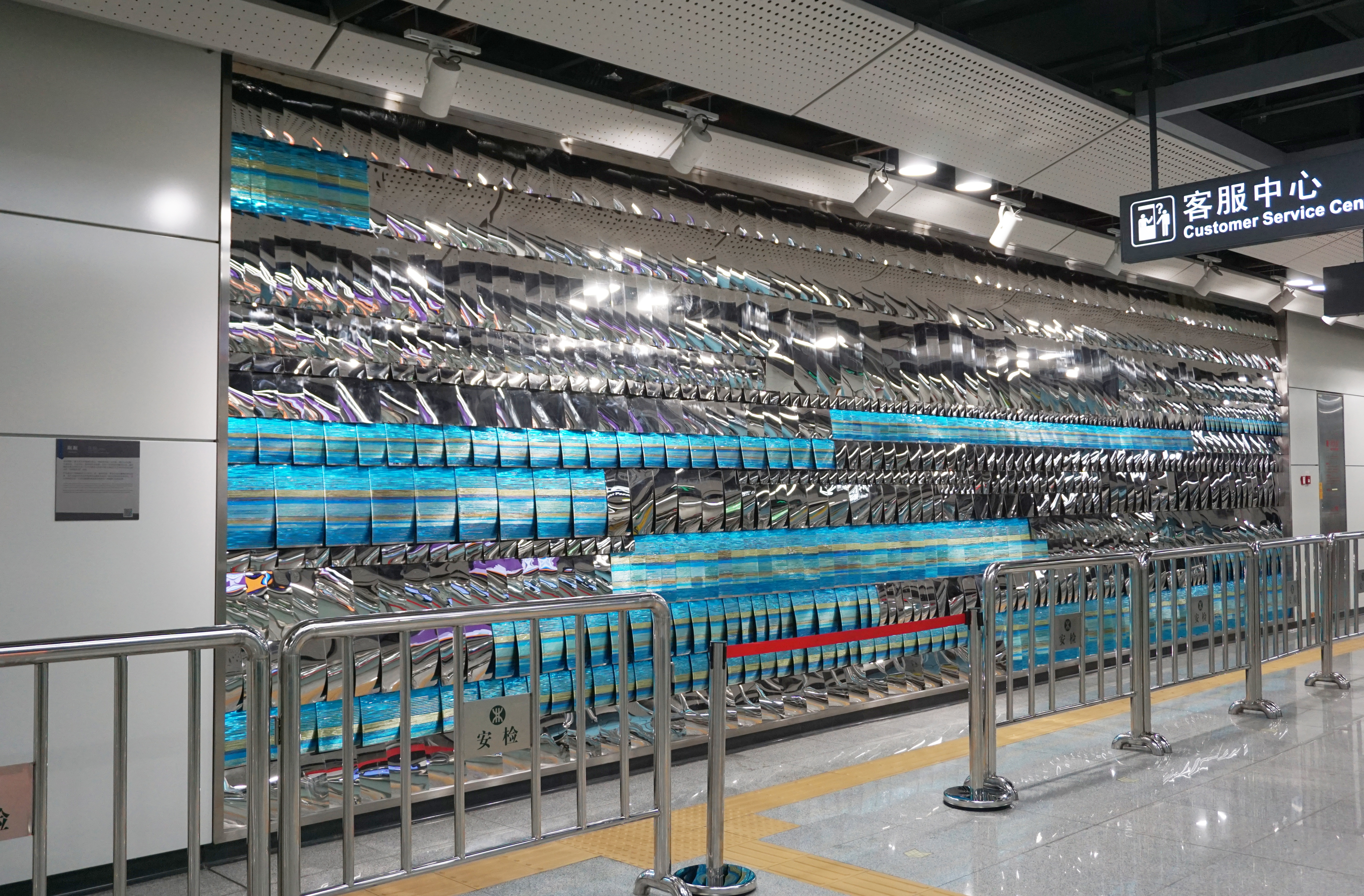
Art Wall - Glistening

Longjing station (Chinese: 龙井站; pinyin: Lóngjǐng Zhàn) is a station on Line 7 of the Shenzhen Metro. It opened on 28 October 2016.

== Station layout ==
G	-	Exits A-D
B1F; Concourse	Lobby	Ticket Machines, Customer Service, Shops, Vending Machines
B2F; Platforms	Platform	7 towards SZU Lihu Campus (Zhuguang)
B2F; Platforms	Island platform, doors will open on the left
B2F; Platforms	Platform	7 towards Tai'an (Taoyuancun)

== Exits ==
Exit	Destination
Exit A	Reserved Exit
Exit B	Longzhu Boulevard (S), Longzhu 5th Road, Nanfen Building, Longjing Village, Yiran Tiandiju, Shenzhen Institute of Legal Education, Shenzhen Reeducation Center, Xili Driving Test Center
Exit C	Longzhu Boulevard (N), School of Administration of the State, Administration for Industry and Commerce, City Holiday Garden, Shiwufeng, Tanglang Hill Park
Exit D	Longzhu Boulevard (N), Dingshengshan Linju, Nanping Expressway, Shenzhen Deao Training School
