= Longjing District =

District of Taichung, Taiwan

Longjing 龍井區 Lungching, Tatsui
- District
- Longjing District
- Longjing District in Taichung City
- Coordinates: 24°12′36.1″N 120°31′4.8″E
- Country: Taiwan
- Region: Western Taichung
- Divisions: List: 15 villages

Government
  - Mayor: Dai Yanru (戴燕如)

Area
  - Total: 38.04 km^{2} (14.69 sq mi)

Population (February 2023)
  - Total: 78,049
  - Rank: 14 out of 29
  - Density: 2,052/km^{2} (5,314/sq mi)
- Postal code: 434
- Website: www.longjing.taichung.gov.tw (in Chinese)

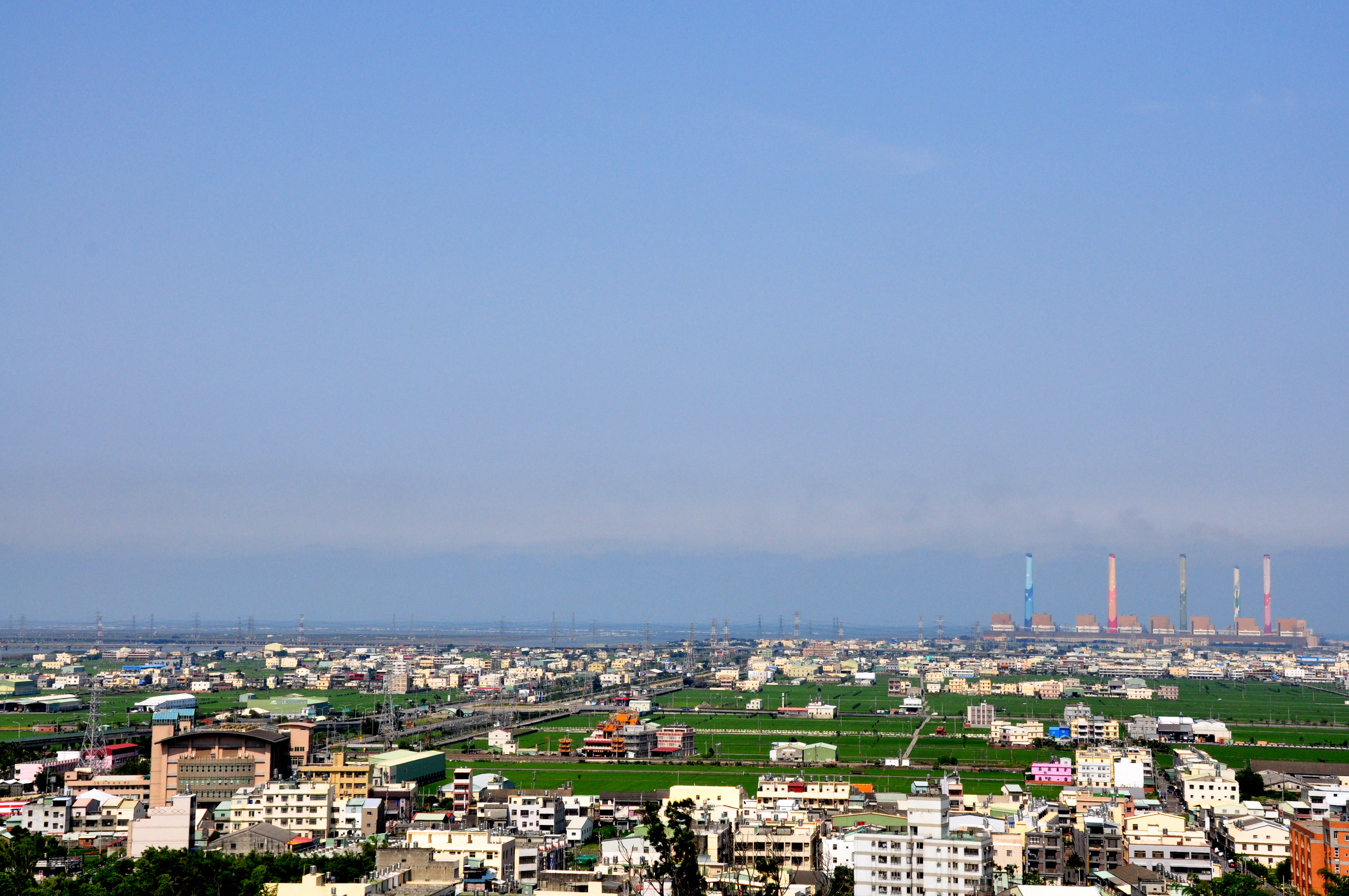
Longjing District. The Taichung Power Plant could be seen on the right.

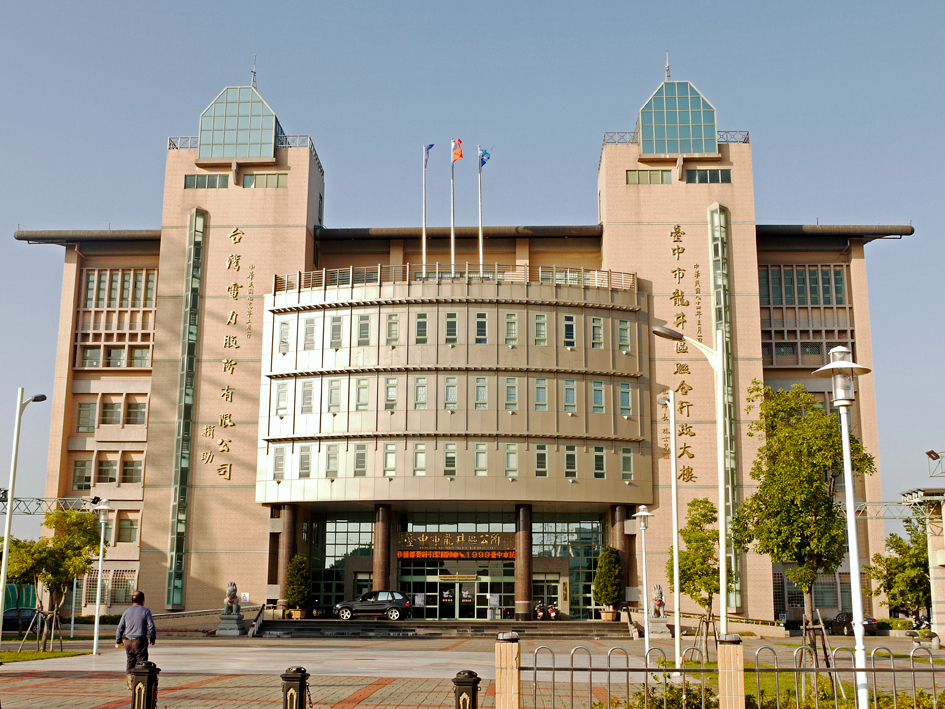
Longjing District office

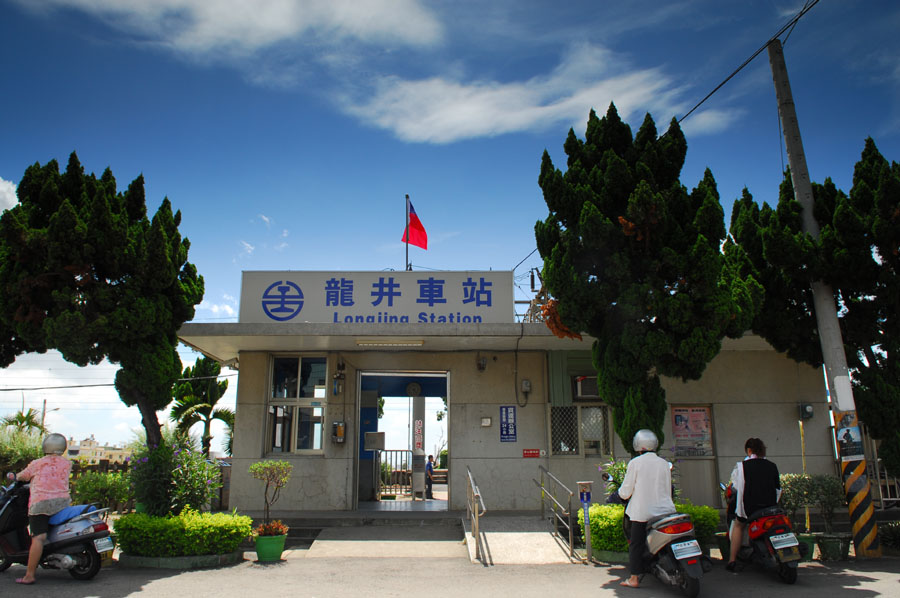
Longjing railway station

Longjing District (Chinese: 龍井區; pinyin: Lóngjǐng Qū) is a coastal suburban district in western Taichung, Taiwan.

== Geography ==
Longjing shares borders with Wuqi and Shalu to the north, Xitun to the east, the Pacific Ocean to the west, Dadu and Shengang in Changhua County to the south. The eastern part of Longjing is located on the Dadu Plateau.

== Name and history ==
The area was originally occupied by the aboriginal Papora people. The term Longjing (龍井) means "Dragon Well"; a well is located in the area. Prior to Japanese rule, the district was called "Chie Tou Village" (茄投庄). During Japanese rule over Taiwan the district was renamed to Longjing (龍井), taken from the name of a famous well in the area named Dragon Eye Well (龍目井)

Dragon Eye Well is located in Longquan Village, under an old camphor tree. One of the Qing governors of Changhua recorded that the well's water was cool and refreshing, and the atmosphere was serene around the well. The name "Dragon Eye" comes from the two rocks around the well that makes it look like a dragon.

== Administrative divisions ==
English name	Chinese name
Zhukeng Village	竹坑里
Longtung Village	龍東里
Longxi Village	龍西里
Tianzhong Village	田中里
Lishui Village	麗水里
Longjin Village	龍津里
Sande Village	三德里
Zhonghe Village	忠和里
Shanjiao Village	山腳里
Longquan Village	龍泉里
Longgang Village	龍崗里
Xinzhuang Village	新庄里
Nanjiao Village	南寮里
Tunghai Village	東海里
Xintung Village	新東里

== Infrastructure ==
Longjing houses Taichung Power Plant, the world's largest coal-fired power plant.

== Transportation ==
The district is served by a variety of national roads.

- National Freeway 3
- Provincial Highway 1
- Provincial Highway 17
- Provincial Highway 61

The district can be reached by rail through TR Longjing Station.

== See also ==
- Taichung
