= Hai-Fu Power Plant =

Power station in Luzhu District, Taoyuan City, Taiwan

Hai-Fu Power Plant 海湖發電廠
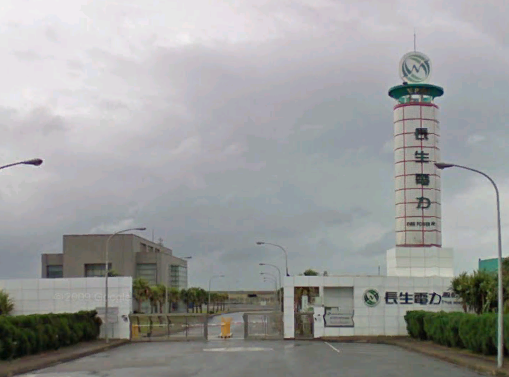
- Country: Taiwan
- Location: Hai-Fu, Luzhu District; Taoyuan City
- Coordinates: 25.116863°N 121.256915°E
- Status: Operational
- Commission date: 1999
- Owner: EverPower IPP Co. Ltd.
- Operator: Ever Power IPP Co., Ltd.

Thermal power station
- Primary fuel: Natural gas
- Combined cycle?: Yes

Power generation
- Units operational: 2
- Nameplate capacity: 980 MW

External links
- Commons: Related media on Commons

The Hai-Fu Power Plant (Chinese: 海湖發電廠; pinyin: Hǎihú Fādiànchǎng) is a 980 MW combined cycle power station located in Luzhu District, Taoyuan City, Taiwan. The station is located 5 km (3 mi) north east of Taoyuan International Airport. The power station runs on natural gas and consists of two KA24-2 turbines. The turnkey project was awarded in 1996 to ABB. The customer is EverPower IPP Co. Ltd. with its head office in Taichung.

== See also ==
- List of largest power stations in the world
- List of natural gas power stations
- Electricity sector in Taiwan
