= Chaguang station =

Metro station in Shenzhen, China

Chaguang 茶光
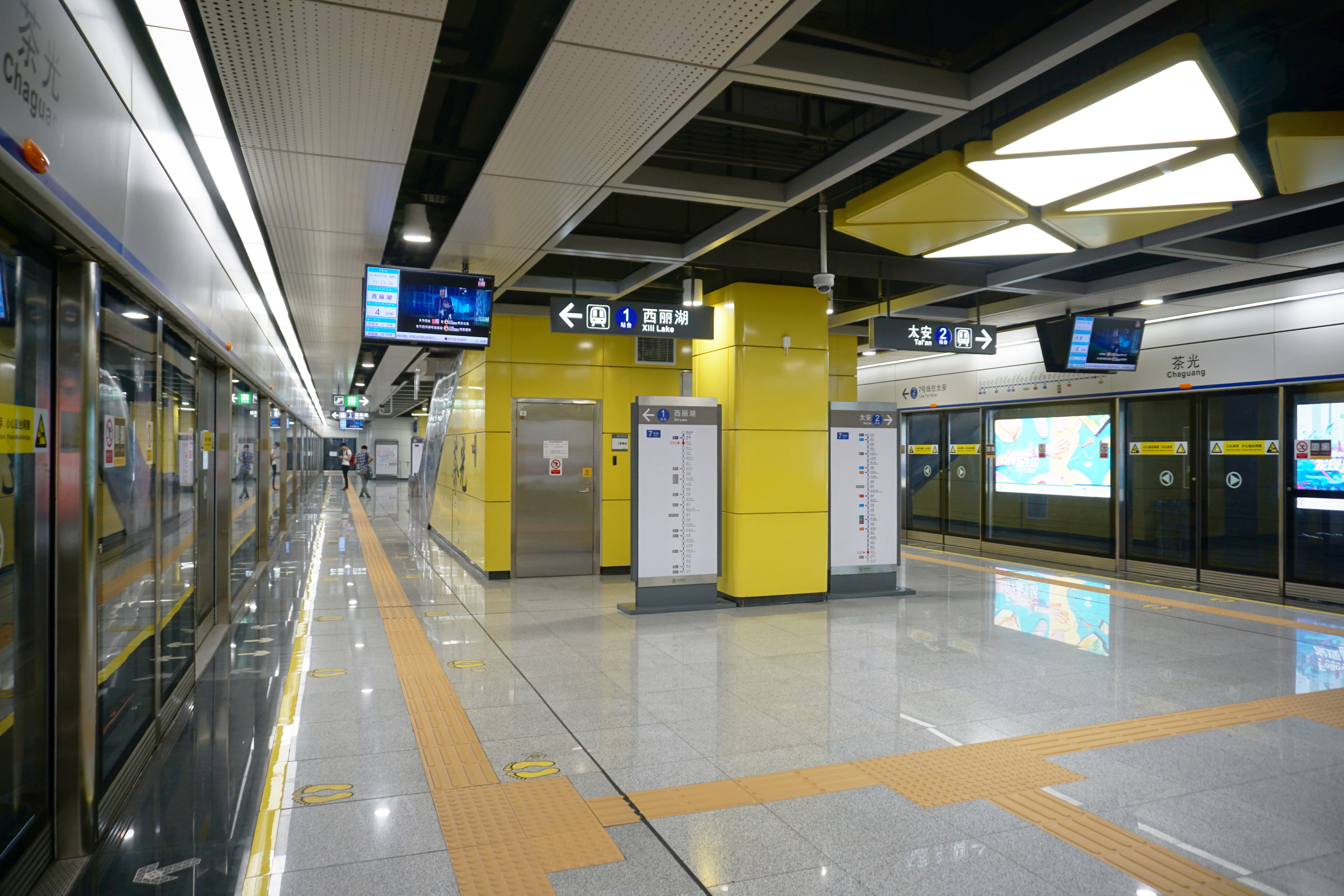
- Platform

General information
- Location: Nanshan District, Shenzhen, Guangdong; China
- Coordinates: 22°34′37″N 113°56′58″E
- Operated by: SZMC (Shenzhen Metro Group)
- Line: Line 7
- Platforms: 2 (1 island platform)
- Tracks: 2

Construction
- Structure type: Underground
- Accessible: Yes

History
- Opened: 28 October 2016 (9 years ago)

Services
Preceding station	Shenzhen Metro	Following station
Xili towards SZU Lihu Campus	Line 7	Zhuguang towards Tai'an
Location

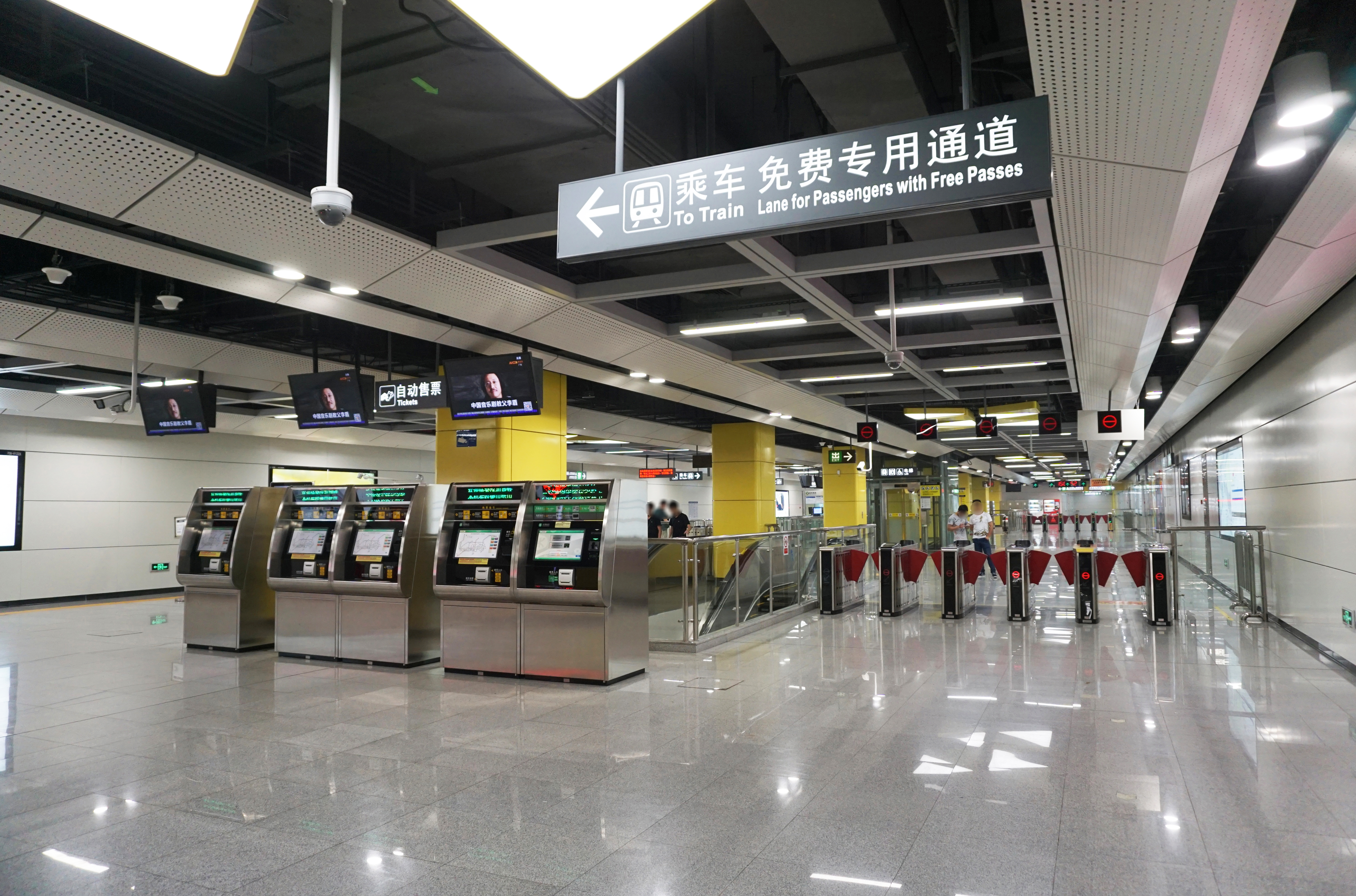
Concourse

Chaguang station (Chinese: 茶光站; pinyin: Cháguāng Zhàn) is a station on Line 7 of the Shenzhen Metro It opened on 28 October 2016.

== Station layout ==
G	-	Exits A-D
B1F; Concourse	Lobby	Ticket Machines, Customer Service, Shops, Vending Machines
B2F; Platforms	Platform	7 towards SZU Lihu Campus (Xili)
B2F; Platforms	Island platform, doors will open on the left
B2F; Platforms	Platform	7 towards Tai'an (Zhuguang)

== Exits ==
Exit	Destination
Exit A	Shahe West Road (W), Liyuancun, Xili South Road
Exit B	Shahe West Road (W), Zhuguang Yuan, Chaguang Industrial Area
Exit C	Shahe West Road (E), Longzhu Boulevard
Exit D	Shahe West Road (E), Shenzhen Nanshan Arts Experimental School, Zhenbao Garden, Lizhu Garden, Taoyuan Cultural & Sports Center
