= Changsheng Bio-Technology =

Chinese biotechnology company

- Native name: Changsheng Bio-Technology Co., Ltd. (Chinese: 长生生物科技股份有限公司)
- Type: Private
- Industry: Health Care
- Founded: 1992
- Headquarters: Lianyungang, China

Changsheng Bio-Technology
- Simplified Chinese: 长生生物科技股份有限公司
- Traditional Chinese: 長生生物科技股份有限公司
- Literal meaning: Long Life Biotechnology Joint-Stock Corporation
Transcriptions
Standard Mandarin
- Hanyu Pinyin: Chángshēng Shēngwùkējì Gǔfènyǒuxiàngōngsī

Changsheng Bio-Technology Co., Ltd. (Chinese: 长生生物科技股份有限公司) is a biotechnology company based in Changchun Jilin, China, specializing in vaccines.

== History ==
The company was founded in 1992 as a state-owned enterprise but became a family-owned private company in 2003.

It reported 566 million yuan in net profits in 2017.

A sales representative was found, in July 2018, to have paid 164,000 yuan (US$24,200) in bribes to the head of the Changling County disease control centre.

Its DPT vaccines, sold to the Shandong Centre for Disease Control and Prevention, which had been given to 215,184 children were found to be ineffective. It was fined 3.4 million yuan.

In October 2018, a unit of the company, Changchun Changsheng Life Sciences Ltd was fined 9.1 billion Yuan ($1.32 billion) for falsifying data for a rabies vaccine and producing an ineffective vaccine for babies. 14 of its executives were banned from working in the drugs sector. It was separately fined 600,000 yuan by the China Securities and Regulatory Commission and four executives were banned for life four of Changsheng Bio-technology's executives and banned them from the securities market because of violation of information disclosure rules. It proposes to pay compensation of between 200,000 and 650,000 yuan per person to those who have suffered from the vaccine.

It lost nearly half of its share value after the China Food and Drug Administration uncovered its data forgery and was publicly condemned by Chinese Communist Party general secretary Xi Jinping and State Council premier Li Keqiang.

Police planned to arrest 18 people, including the chairwoman Gao Junfang, on suspicion of producing and selling substandard drugs.
