= Longjing railway station =

Railway station in Taichung, Taiwan

Longjing Station 龍井車站
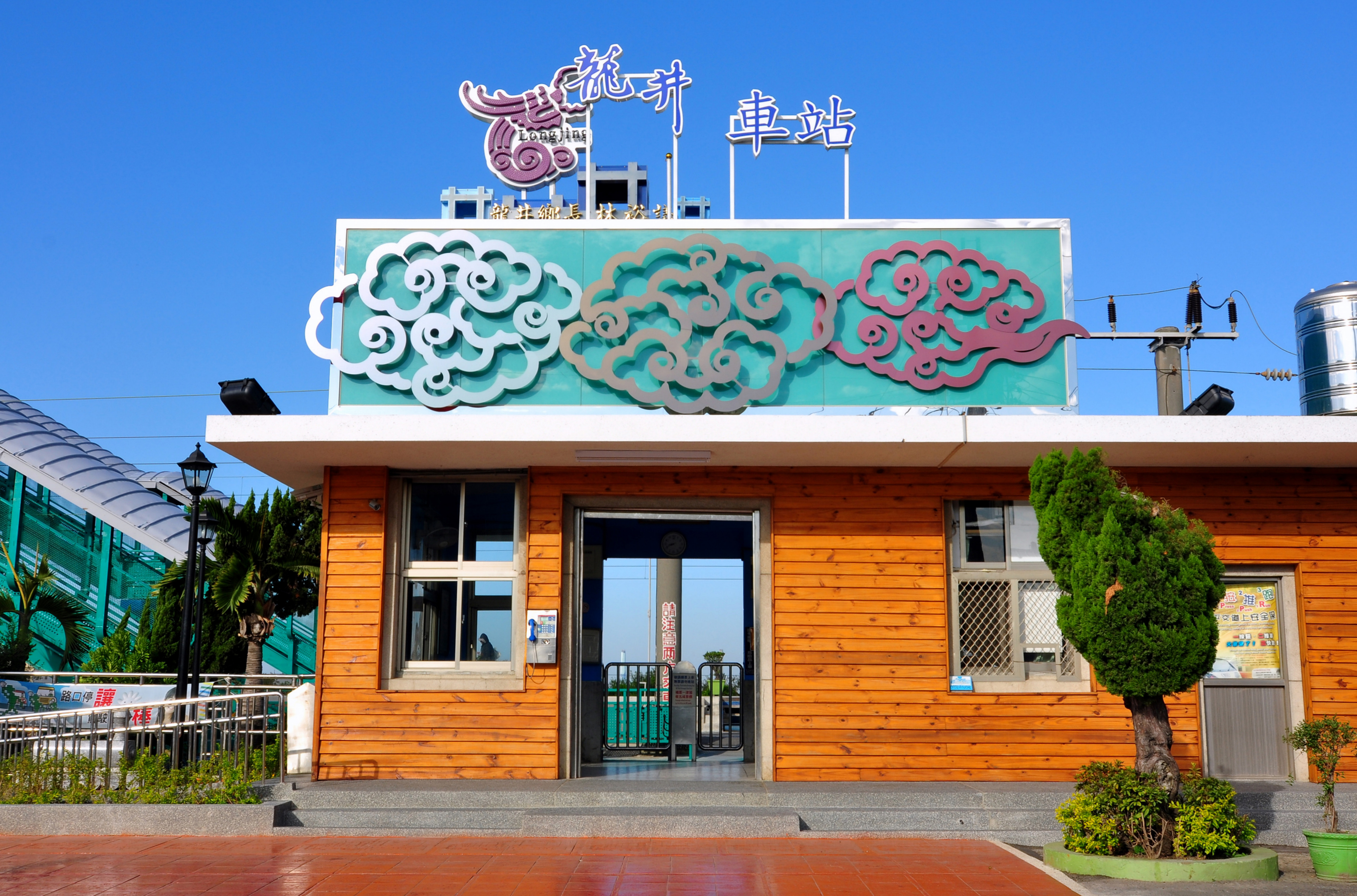

General information
- Location: Longjing, Taichung, Taiwan
- Coordinates: 24°11′51.2″N 120°32′36.0″E
- System: Train station
- Owner: Taiwan Railway Corporation
- Operator: Taiwan Railway Corporation
- Line: Western Trunk line
- Train operators: Taiwan Railway Corporation

History
- Opened: 25 December 1920

Passengers
- 1,037 daily (2024)
Location

Longjing (Chinese: 龍井車站; pinyin: Lóngjǐng Chēzhàn) is a railway station on Taiwan Railway West Coast line (Coastal line) located in Longjing District, Taichung, Taiwan.

== History ==
The station was opened on 15 December 1920.

== Structure ==
There is an island platform at the station.

There is an overpass as of November 2017, but it can only be accessed when station staff open the gates.

== Service ==
Longjing station is primarily serviced by local trains.

== Around the station ==
- Taichung Power Plant

== See also ==
- List of railway stations in Taiwan

Preceding station	Taiwan Railway	Following station
Shalu towards Keelung	Western Trunk line	Dadu towards Pingtung
