= Ever Power IPP =

Independent power producer of Taiwan

Ever Power IPP Co., Ltd. 長生電力
- Industry: electric power
- Founded: 30 January 1996
- Headquarters: Luzhu, Taoyuan City, Taiwan

The Ever Power IPP Co., Ltd. (traditional Chinese: 長生電力; simplified Chinese: 长生电力; pinyin: Chángshēng Diànlì) is an independent power producer company in Taiwan. It operates as the subsidiary of Singapore Power International Pte. Ltd.

== History ==
The company was founded on 30 January 1996.

== Power plants ==
- Changsheng Power Plant in Luzhu District, Taoyuan City.

== See also ==
- Electricity sector in Taiwan
- List of power stations in Taiwan
