= Shanshang District =

District in Tainan, Taiwan

Coordinates: 23.09126°N 120.368759°E

Shanshang 山上區 Yamakami
- District
- Shanshang District in Tainan City
- Location: Tainan, Taiwan

Area
  - Total: 28 km^{2} (11 sq mi)

Population (May 2022)
  - Total: 6,966
  - Density: 250/km^{2} (640/sq mi)
- Website: shanshang.tainan.gov.tw/en/

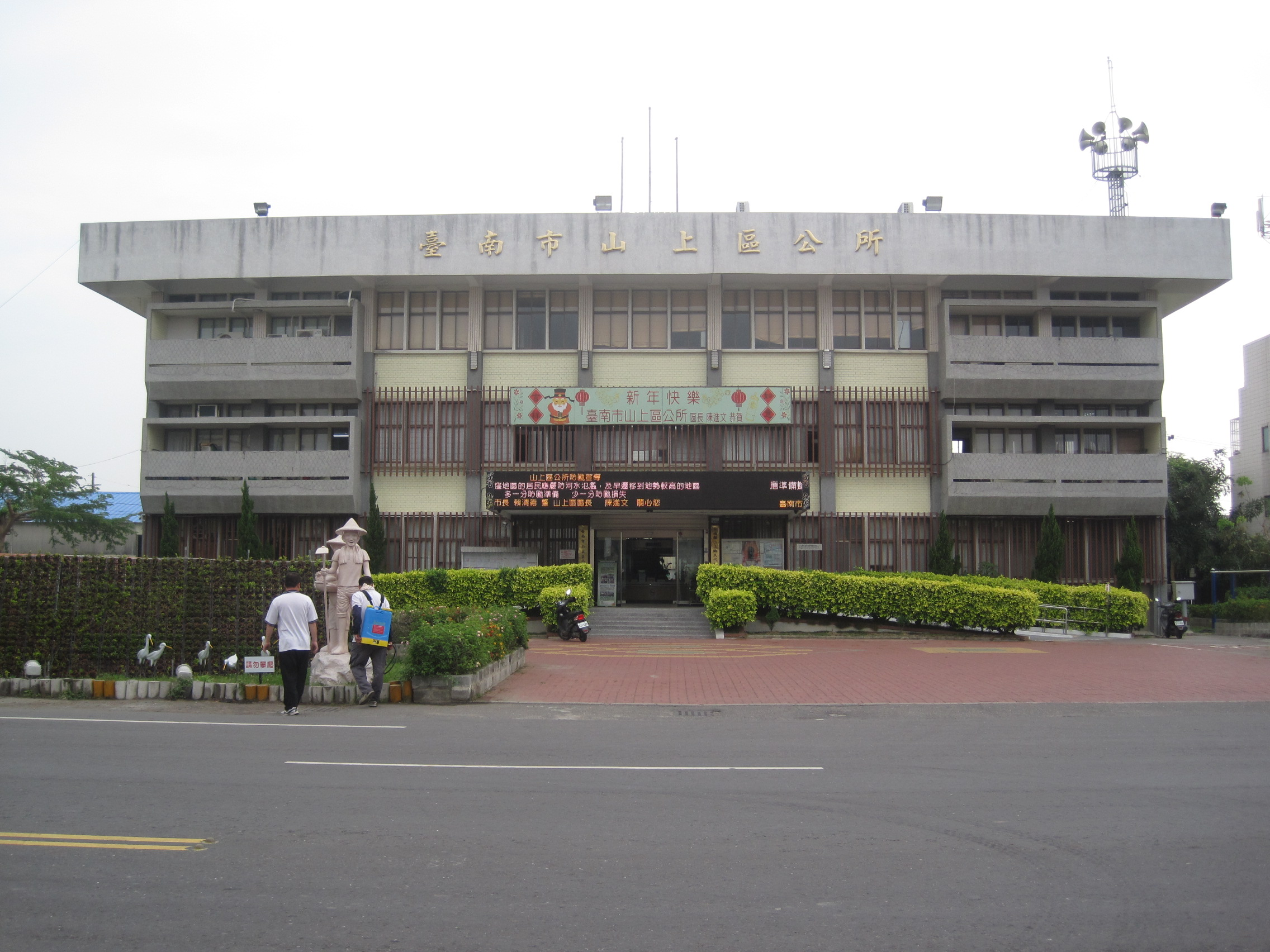
Shanshang District office

Shanshang District (Chinese: 山上區; pinyin: Shānshàng Qū; Pe̍h-ōe-jī: San-siōng-khu) is a rural district of about 6,966 residents in Tainan, Taiwan.

== History ==
In July 1946, the villages of Dashe and Tanding, originally part of Shanshang, were transferred to the administration of Sinshih Township.

== Administrative divisions ==
The district consists of Minghe, Nanzhou, Shanshang, Xinzhuang, Yufeng, Pingyang and Fengde Village.

== Infrastructure ==
- Sun Ba Power Plant

== Tourist attractions ==
- Tainan Shan-Shang Garden and Old Waterworks Museum
- Mingde Minimum Security Prison
- Shanshang Township Water Treatment Plant
- Tianhou Temple

== See also ==
- Tainan
