= China Merchants Bank Tower Global HQ =

Skyscraper in Shenzhen, Guangdong, China

- 招银环球金融中心
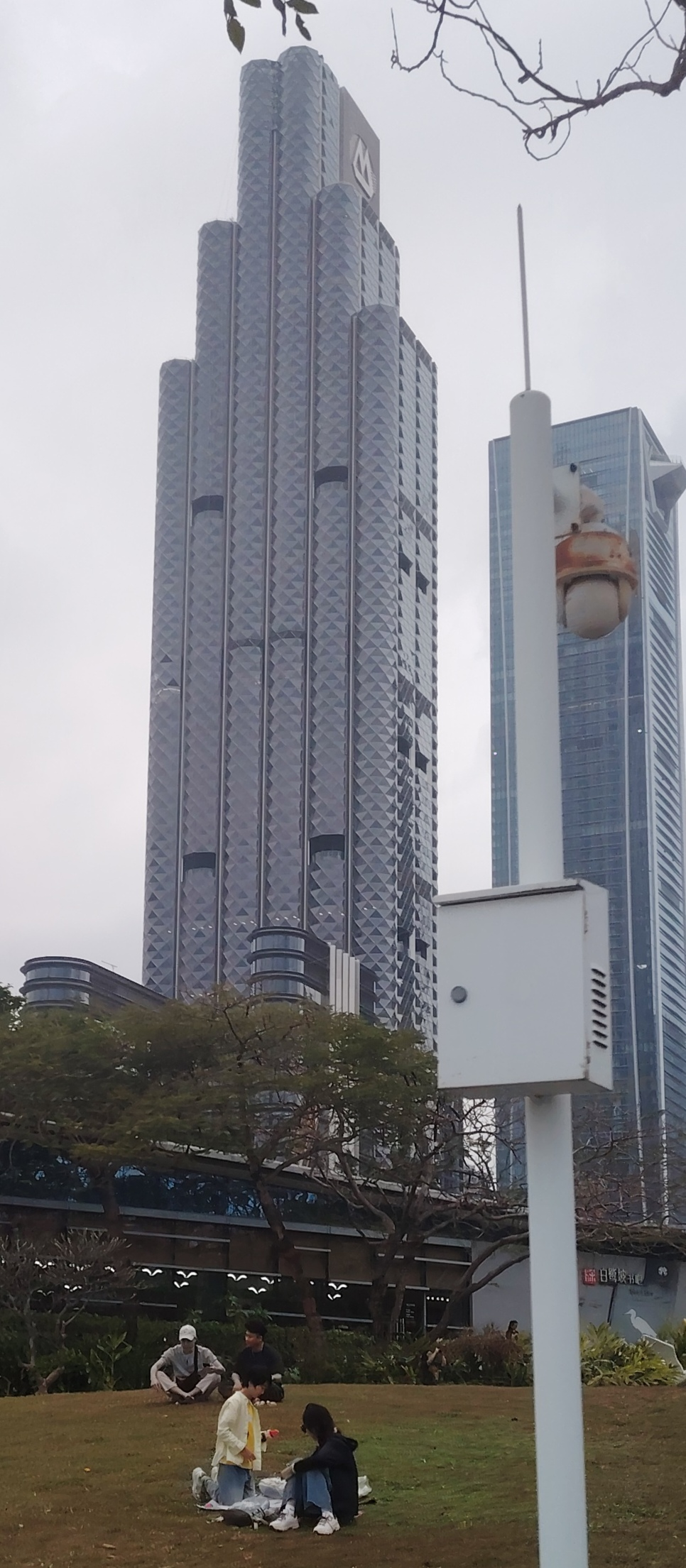
- Building in March 2026
- Interactive map of the China Merchants Bank Tower Global HQ area
- Former names: 招商银行全球总部大厦

General information
- Status: Completed
- Type: Office
- Location: Baishi 4th Road & Shenwan 2nd Road, Nanshan District, Shenzhen, Guangdong, China
- Coordinates: 22°31′31″N 113°57′55″E
- Groundbreaking: December 2018
- Completed: 4 December 2025

Height
- Roof: 393 m (1,289 ft) (Main Tower)

Technical details
- Floor count: 77 (+4 underground) (Main Tower)
- Floor area: 470,000 m^{2} (5,060,000 sq ft)

Design and construction
- Architects: Foster + Partners & CCDI Group
- Developer: China Merchants Bank

Renovating team
- Main contractor: China Construction Eighth Engineering Division; Shanghai Construction Group

Other information
- Public transit: 9 11 Hongshuwan South

China Merchants Bank Tower Global HQ (Chinese: 招银环球金融中心) is a mixed-use skyscraper building complex in Shenzhen, Guangdong, China. Built between 2019 and 2025, the complex consists of five towers with the tallest one (Main Tower) standing at 393 m (1,289 ft) tall with 77 floors which is the third tallest building in Shenzhen.

== Architecture ==
The main tower will replace the China Merchants Bank Tower as the new headquarters of China Merchants Bank. Construction began in 2019, was adjusted during the pandemic, and was redesigned before resuming construction, with completion delayed until 2025. The China Merchants Bank Global Headquarters Building consists of an office building that is 393 meters high and four auxiliary buildings on the south side, with a total area of 470,000 m^{2} (5,060,000 sq ft).

=== Construction ===
In December 2016, China Merchants Bank won the land rights of the T207-0051 plot where the project is located for RMB 5.95 billion. In September 2017, the design bidding for the China Merchants Bank Global Headquarters Building officially commenced, and Norman Foster + Partners was ultimately awarded the contract at the end of 2018. In December 2018, the project's foundation work officially began. In March 2022, the authorities approved the redesigned plan for the project, increasing the height of the main building from 350 meters to 393 meters.

== See also ==
- List of tallest buildings in Shenzhen
- List of tallest buildings in China
