= Shopping Park station =

Metro station in Shenzhen, Guangdong, China

Shopping Park 购物公园
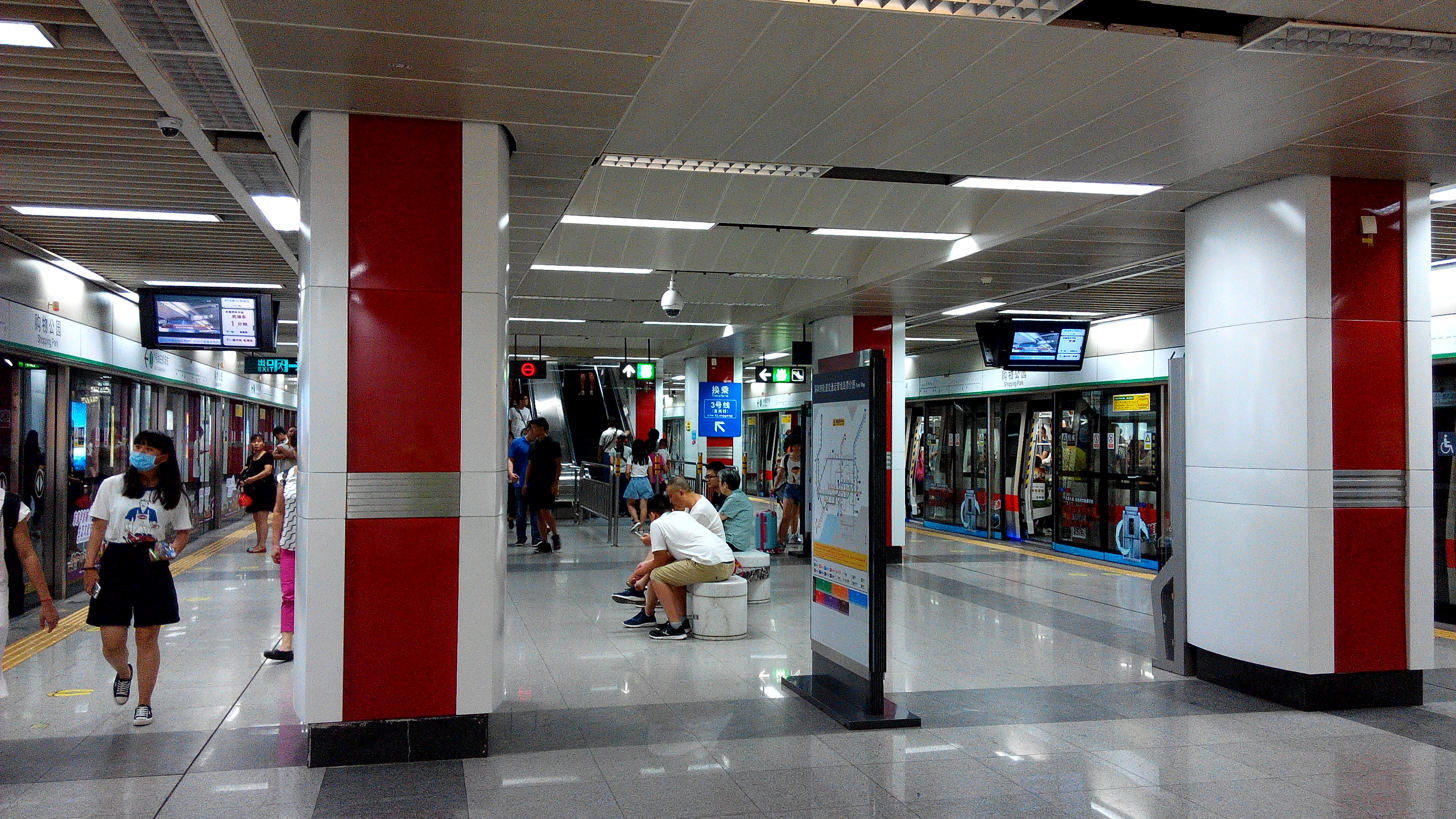
- Line 1 platform

Chinese name
- Traditional Chinese: 購物公園
- Simplified Chinese: 购物公园
Transcriptions
Standard Mandarin
- Hanyu Pinyin: Gòuwù Gōngyuán
Yue: Cantonese
- Jyutping: Gau/Kau3 Mat6 Gung1jyun4/2

General information
- Location: Futian District, Shenzhen, Guangdong; China
- Coordinates: 22°32′4″N 114°3′17″E
- Operated by: SZMC (Shenzhen Metro Group)
- Lines: Line 1; Line 3
- Platforms: 4 (2 island platforms)
- Tracks: 4

Construction
- Structure type: Underground
- Accessible: Yes

Other information
- Station code: 122 (Line 1); 304 (Line 3)

History
- Opened: Line 1: 28 December 2004 (21 years ago); Line 3: 28 June 2011 (14 years ago)
- Previous names: Gouwugongyuan

Services
Preceding station	Shenzhen Metro	Following station
Xiangmihu towards Airport East	Line 1	Convention and Exhibition Center towards Luohu
Futian towards Pingdi Liulian	Line 3	Shixia towards Futian Bonded Area
Route map
B2F
B3F
Location

Shopping Park station (simplified Chinese: 购物公园站; traditional Chinese: 購物公園站; pinyin: Gòuwù Gōngyuán Zhàn; Jyutping: Gau/Kau3 Mat6 Gung1 Jyun4/2 Zaam6), formerly known in English as the Gouwugongyuan station, is a station on Line 1 and Line 3 of the Shenzhen Metro. The Line 1 platforms opened on 28 December 2004 and the Line 3 platforms opened on 28 June 2011. It is located underneath the junction of Fuhua Road (福华路; 福華路), Yitian Road (益田路) and Mintian Road (民田路) in Futian District, Shenzhen, China. The station takes its name from COCO Park (星河购物公园; 星河購物公園), a major shopping mall. It also has underground connections to Futian station via Link City and the Ping An Finance Centre.

== Station layout ==
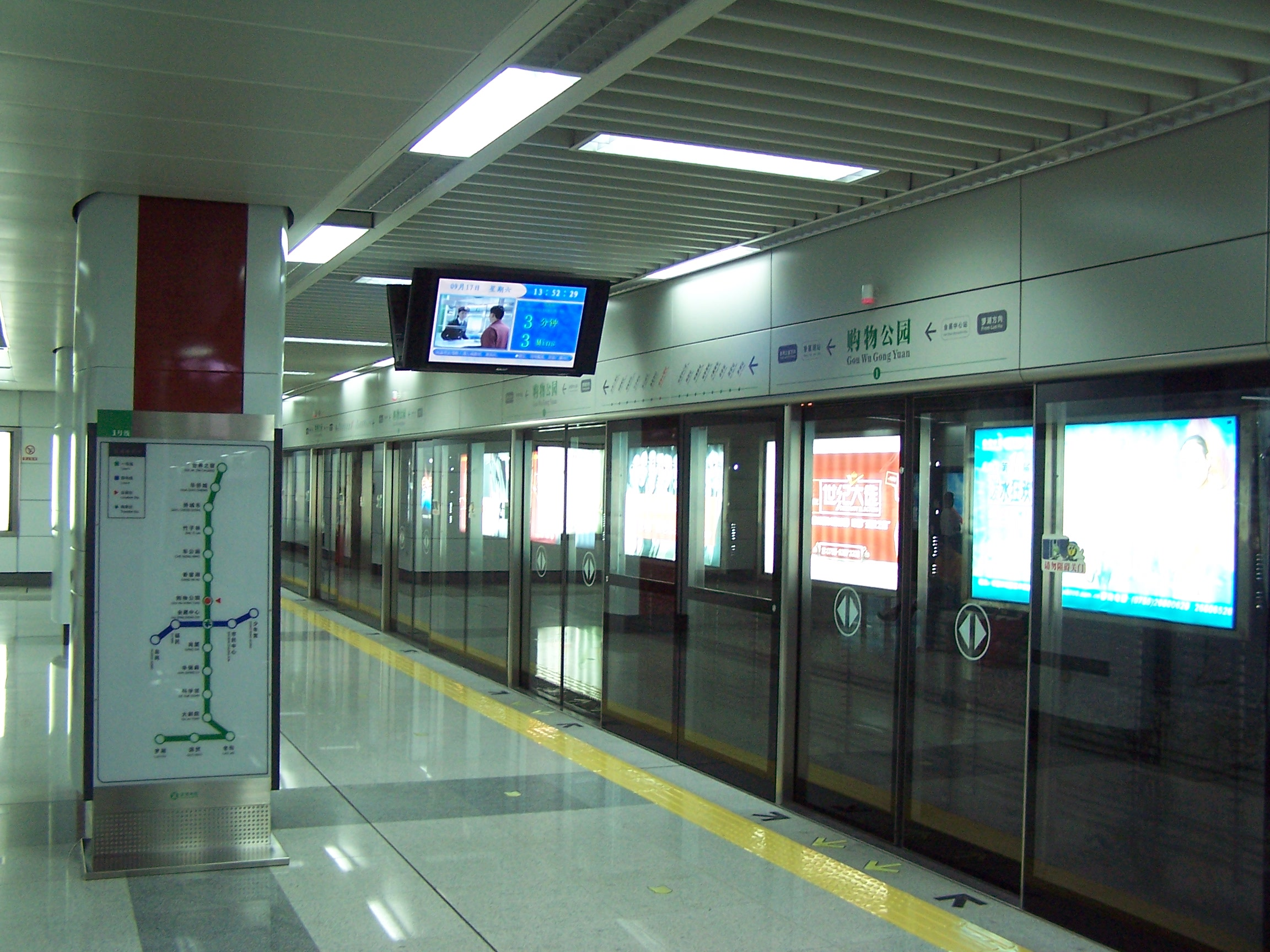
Shopping Park station (previous name Gouwugongyuan) platform in 2005

G	-	Exits A-H
B1F; Concourse	Lobby	Ticket machines, customer service, shops, vending machines, transfer passage between Line 1 and Line 3
B2F; 1 Platforms	Platform	1 towards Airport East (Xiangmihu)
B2F; 1 Platforms	Island platform, doors will open on the left
B2F; 1 Platforms	Platform	1 towards Luohu (Convention and Exhibition Center)
B3F; 3 Platforms	Platform	3 towards Futian Bonded Area (Shixia)
B3F; 3 Platforms	Island platform, doors will open on the left
B3F; 3 Platforms	Platform	3 towards Pingdi Liulian (Futian)

== Exits ==
Exit	Destination
Exit A	Fuhua Road (N), Yitian Road, Futian (China Railway Highspeed, Shenzhen Metro Line 2, Line 3, Line 11)
Exit B	Fuhua Road (N), Mintian Road, COCO Park, Investment Building, Bus Transfer Station, Link City, Excellence Building, Hangtian Building, Huarong Building, Duty-free Business Building, NCI Building, China Union Building, Central Business Building, Times Finance Center
Exit C	Fuhua Road (S), Mintian Road, DREAMS-ON Department Store, Marco Polo Shenzhen, COCO Park, Chengzhong Yayuan, Fazhan Xingyuan
Exit D	Fuhua Road (S), Yitian Road, Futian Shangri-La, Galaxy International, Huangdu Plaza, Excellence Times Plaza, Duty-free Business Building
Exit D2	Ping An Finance Centre
Exit E	Fuhua 2nd Road, Fuhua 3rd Road, Mintian Road (E), Miantian Road Bus Terminal, International Garden, Chengzhongyayuan
Exit F	COCO Park
Exit G	COCO Park
Exit H	Fuhua Road (S), Xinzhou Road, Mintian Road (W), Zhonghaihuating
