= Chegongmiao station =

Metro station in Shenzhen, Guangdong, China

Chegongmiao 车公庙
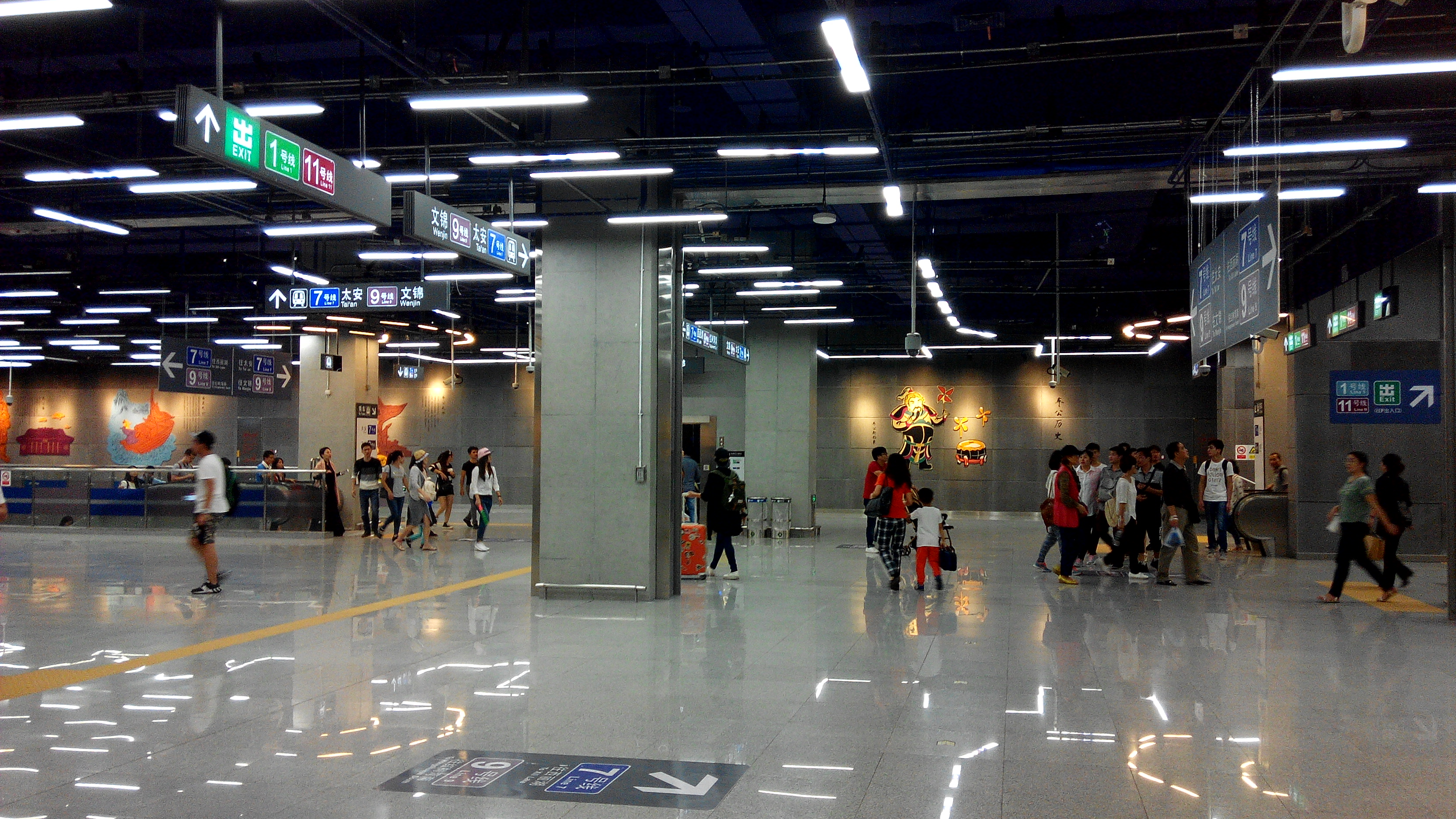
- Lines 7 and 9 concourse

Chinese name
- Traditional Chinese: 車公廟
- Simplified Chinese: 车公庙
- Literal meaning: Charioteer Temple
Transcriptions
Standard Mandarin
- Hanyu Pinyin: Chēgōngmiaò
Yue: Cantonese
- Yale Romanization: Chēgūngmiuh
- Jyutping: Ce1gung1miu6

General information
- Location: Futian District, Shenzhen, Guangdong; China
- Coordinates: 22°32′10″N 114°1′33″E
- Operator: SZMC (Shenzhen Metro Group)
- Lines: Line 1; Line 7; Line 9; Line 11
- Platforms: 8 (4 island platforms)
- Tracks: 8

Construction
- Structure type: Underground
- Accessible: Yes

Other information
- Station code: 120 (Line 1); 712 (Line 7); 915 (Line 9); 1117 (Line 11)

History
- Opened: 28 December 2004 (21 years ago) (Line 1); 28 June 2016 (10 years ago) (Line 11); 28 October 2016 (9 years ago) (Lines 7 & 9)

Passengers
- 2015: 57,528 daily
- Rank: 9th of 118

Services
Preceding station	Shenzhen Metro	Following station
Zhuzilin towards Airport East	Line 1	Xiangmihu towards Luohu
Nonglin towards SZU Lihu Campus	Line 7	Shangsha towards Tai'an
Xiangmei towards Wenjin	Line 9	Xiasha towards Qianwan
Hongshuwan South towards Bitou	Line 11	Futian towards Hongling South
Track layout
1 11 Upper platforms
7 9 Lower platforms
Location

Chegongmiao station is a station on Line 1, Line 7, Line 9 and Line 11 of the Shenzhen Metro. It is located underneath Shennan Road, at the west of Xiangmihu Road, in Futian District, Shenzhen, China. It is near China Merchants Bank Tower and Donghai Pacific Mall.

It is the first four-line interchange station in the Shenzhen Metro, and the second in mainland China after the Century Avenue station of the Shanghai Metro. The Line 1 platforms opened on 28 December 2004, the Line 11 platforms opened on 28 June 2016 and the Line 7 and Line 9 platforms opened on 28 October 2016.

This station provides cross-platform interchange between Line 7 and Line 9, but not between Line 1 and Line 11.

== Station layout ==
G	-	Exits A-H, J
B1F; Concourse	Lobby	Ticket machines, customer service, shops, vending machines, transfer passage between Line 1, Line 7, Line 9, and Line 11
B2F; 1 and 11 Platforms		1 towards Airport East (Zhuzilin)
B2F; 1 and 11 Platforms	Island platform, doors will open on the left
B2F; 1 and 11 Platforms		1 towards Luohu (Xiangmihu)
B2F; 1 and 11 Platforms		11 towards Bitou (Hongshuwan South)
B2F; 1 and 11 Platforms	Island platform, doors will open on the left
B2F; 1 and 11 Platforms		11 towards Hongling South (Futian)
B3F; 7 and 9 Platforms		7 towards SZU Lihu Campus (Nonglin)
B3F; 7 and 9 Platforms	Island platform, doors will open on the right
B3F; 7 and 9 Platforms		9 towards Qianwan (Xiasha)
B3F; 7 and 9 Platforms		7 towards Tai'an (Shangsha)
B3F; 7 and 9 Platforms	Island platform, doors will open on the left
B3F; 7 and 9 Platforms		9 towards Wenjin (Xiangmei)

== Gallery ==
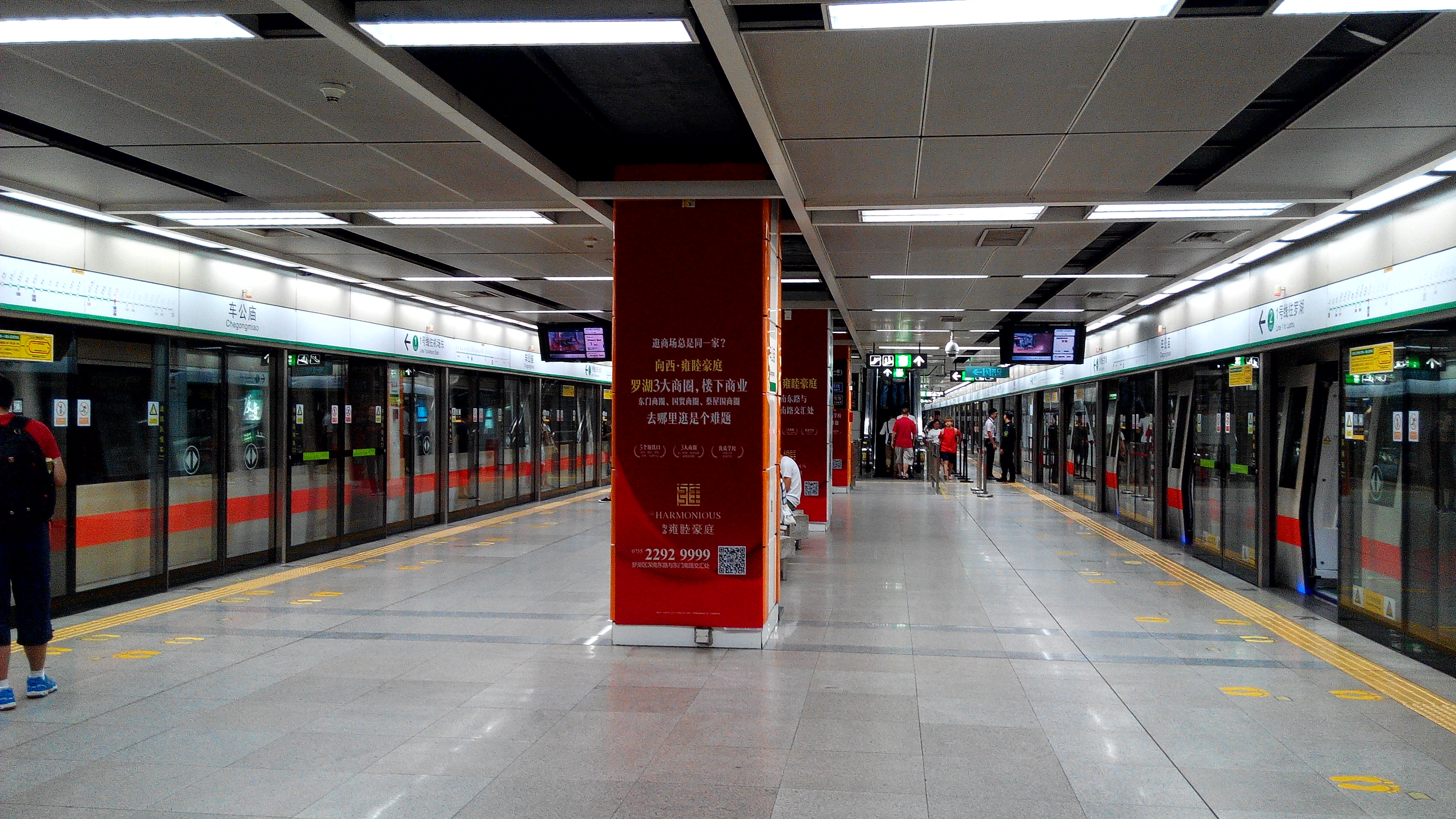
platform of line 1

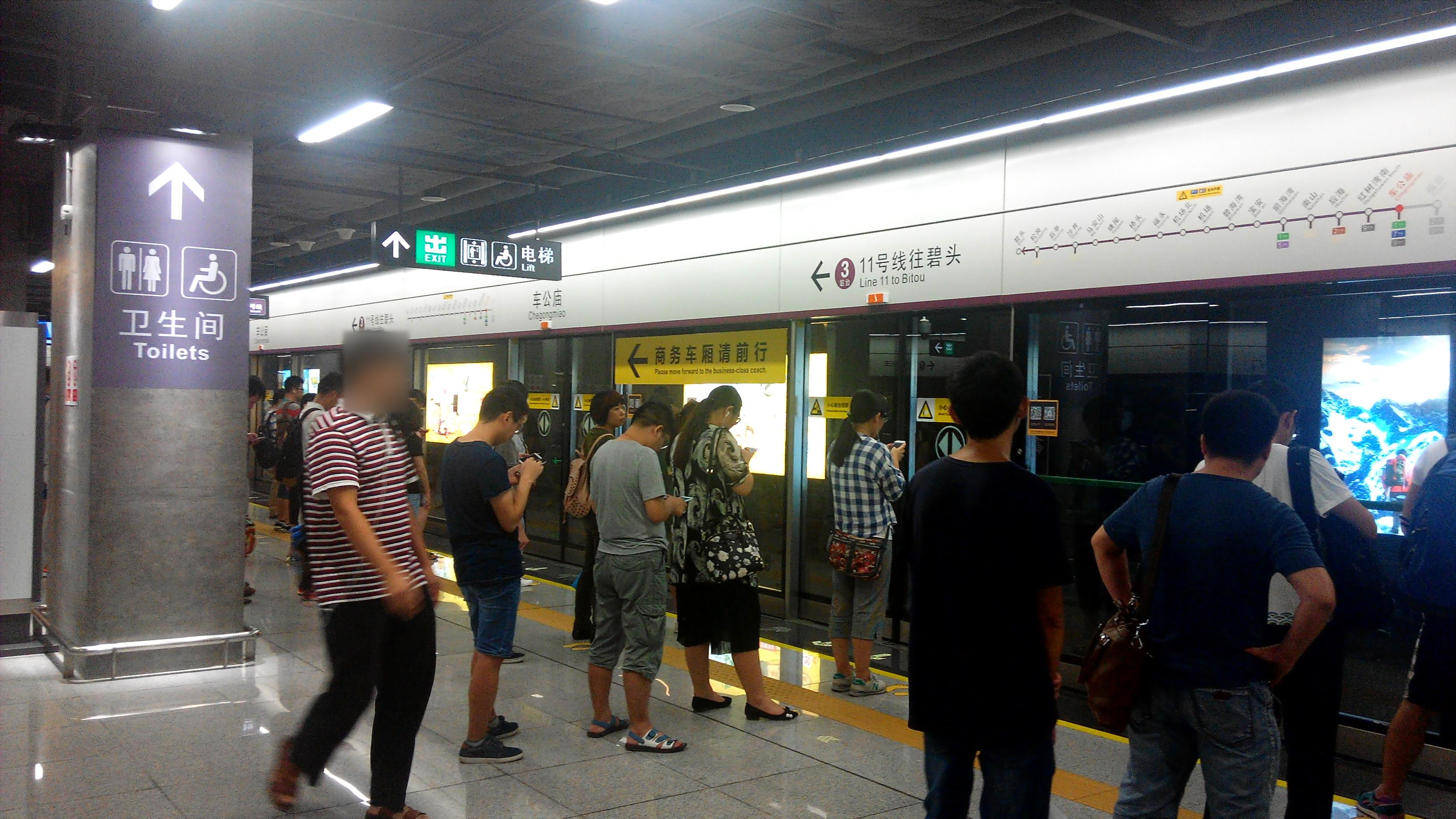
platform of line 11

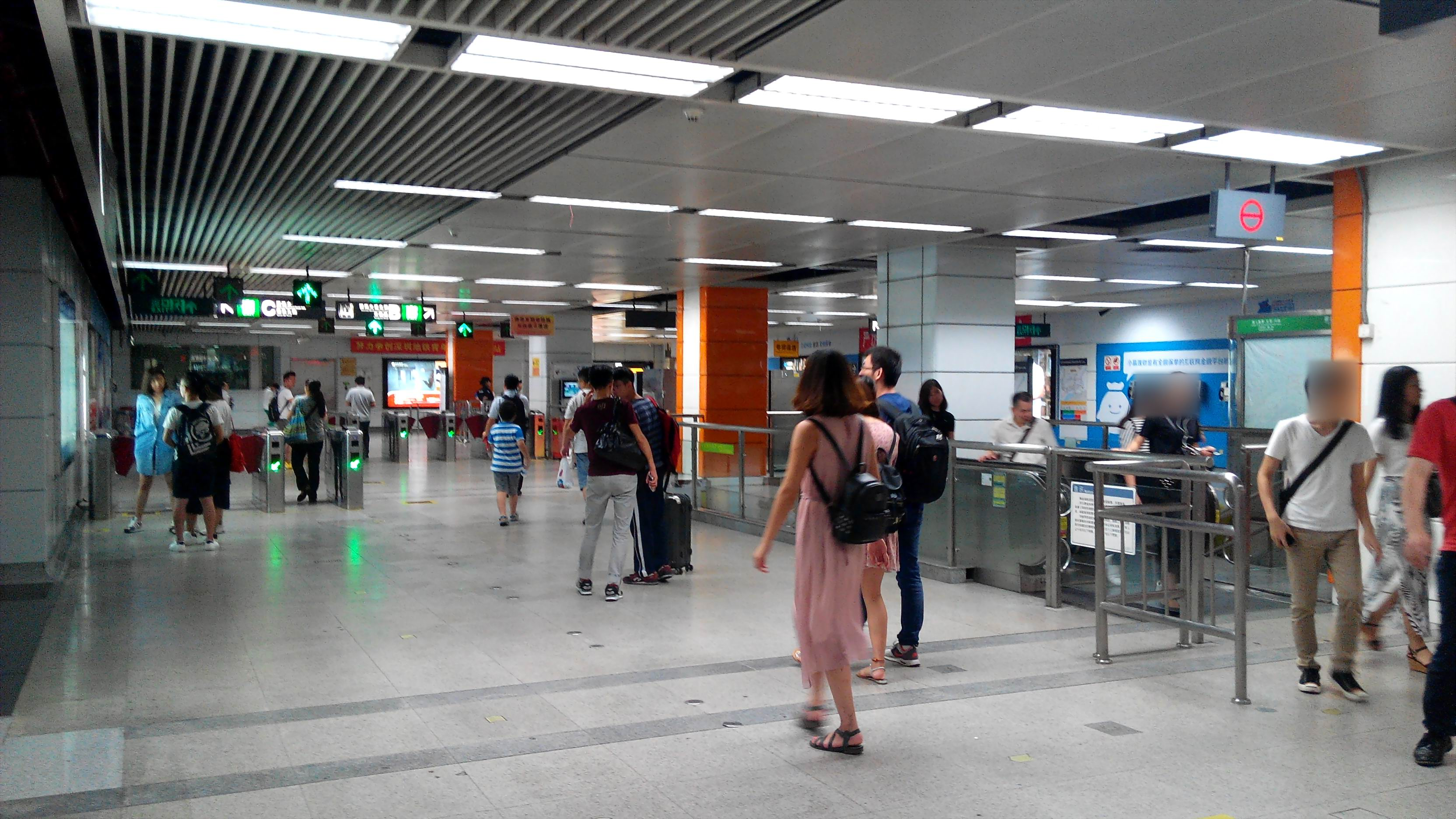
Hall of line 1

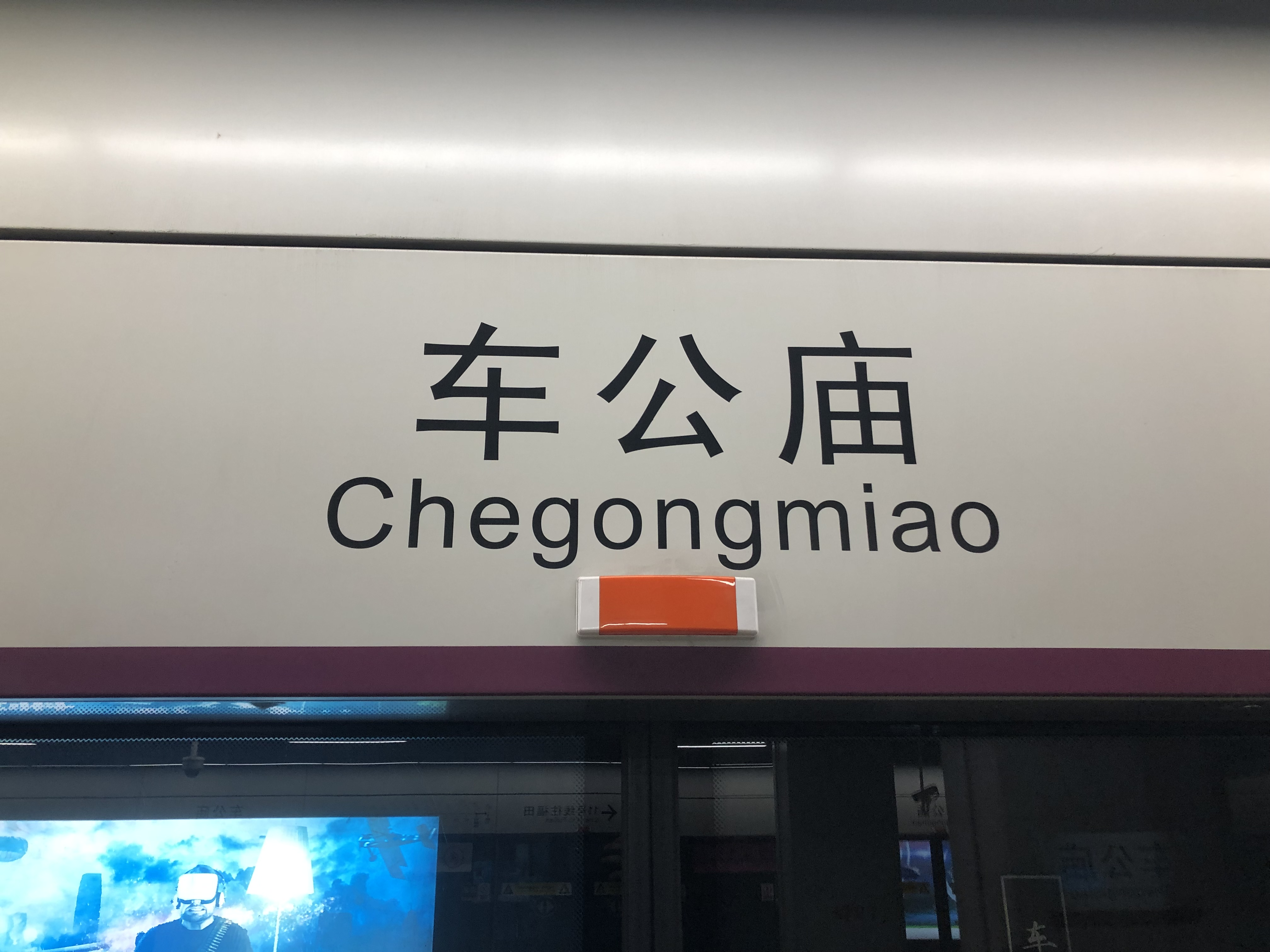

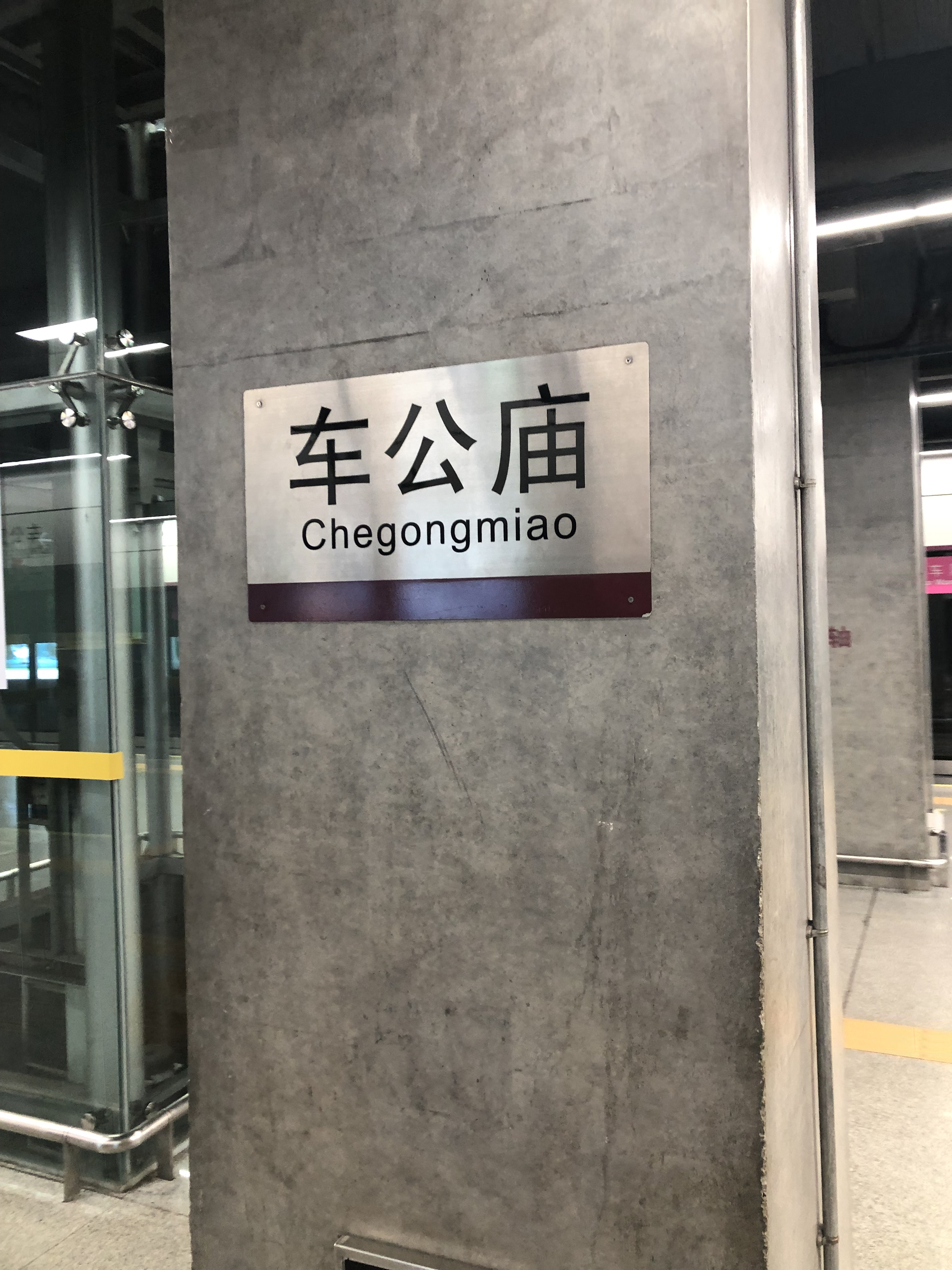

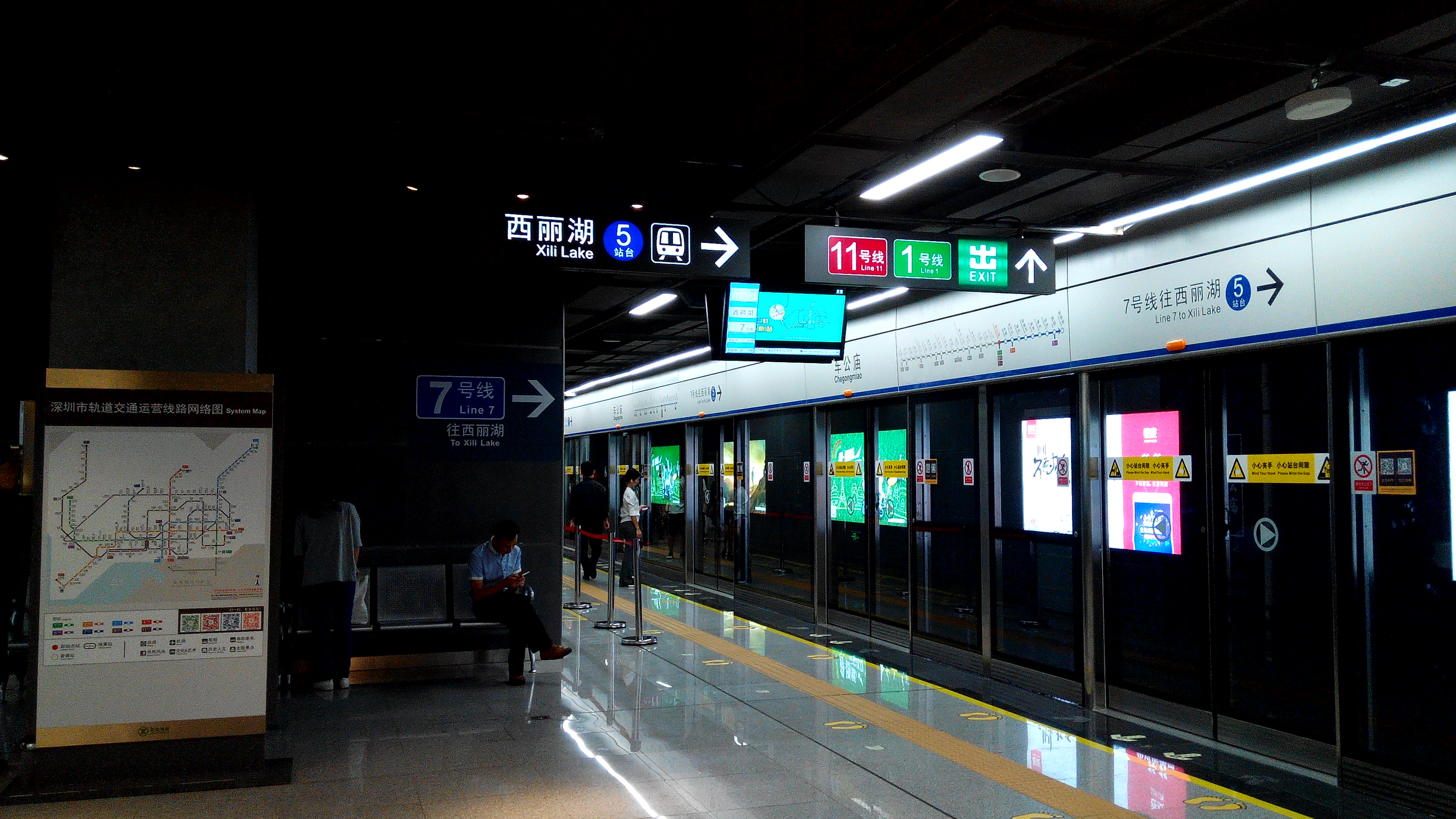
Platform 5, Line 7

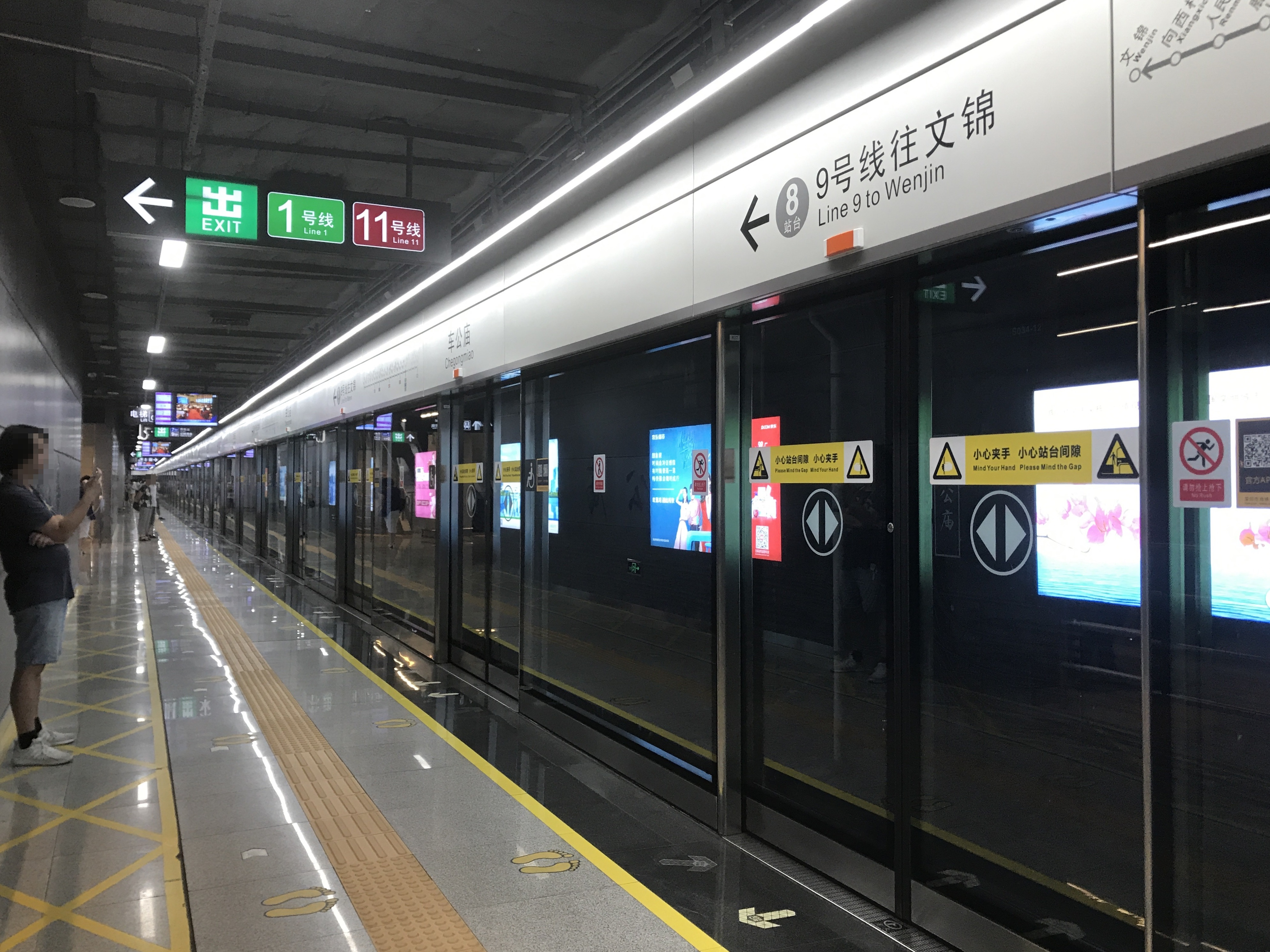
Platform 8, Line 9

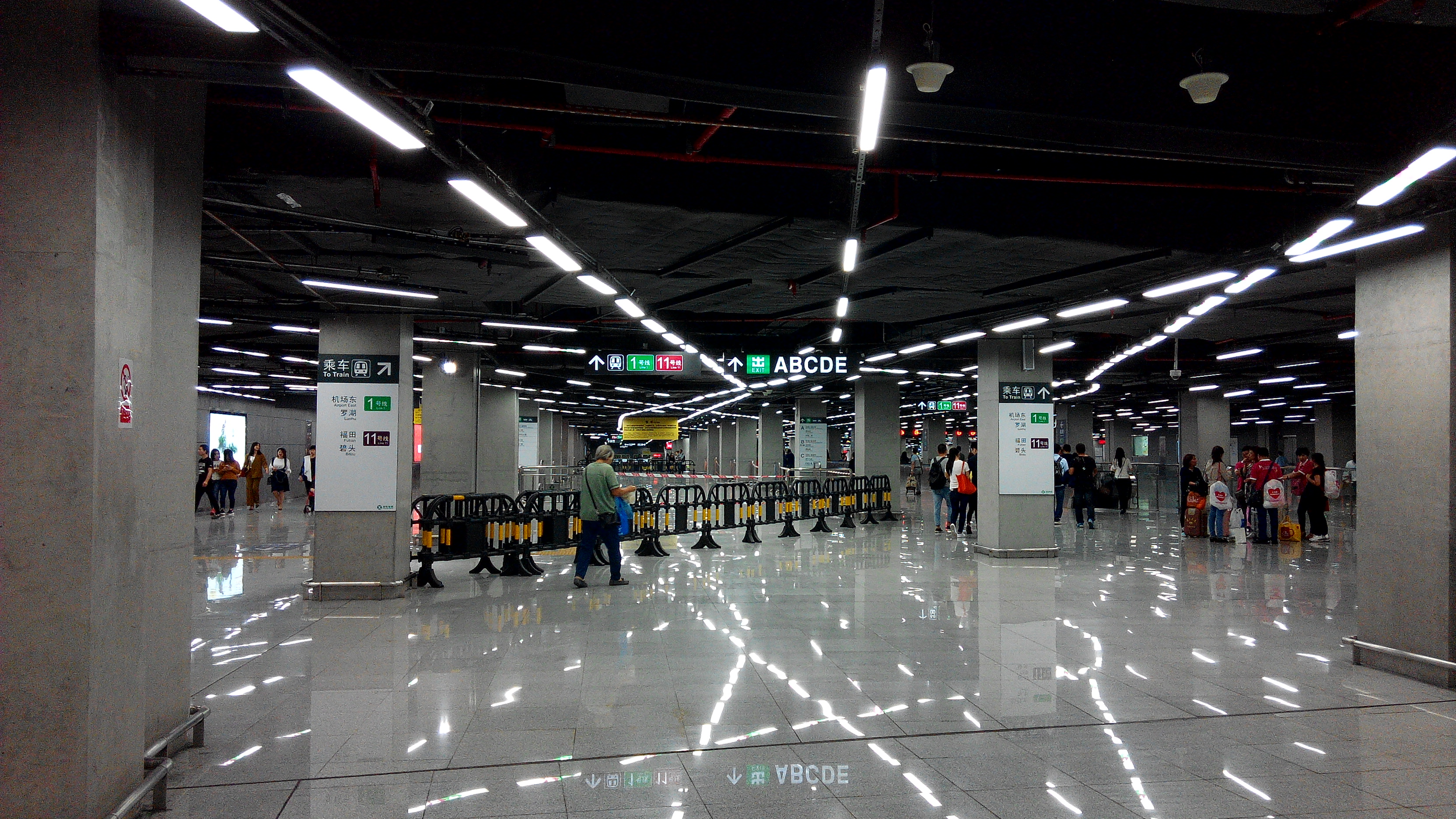
Concourse facing line 1 and 11

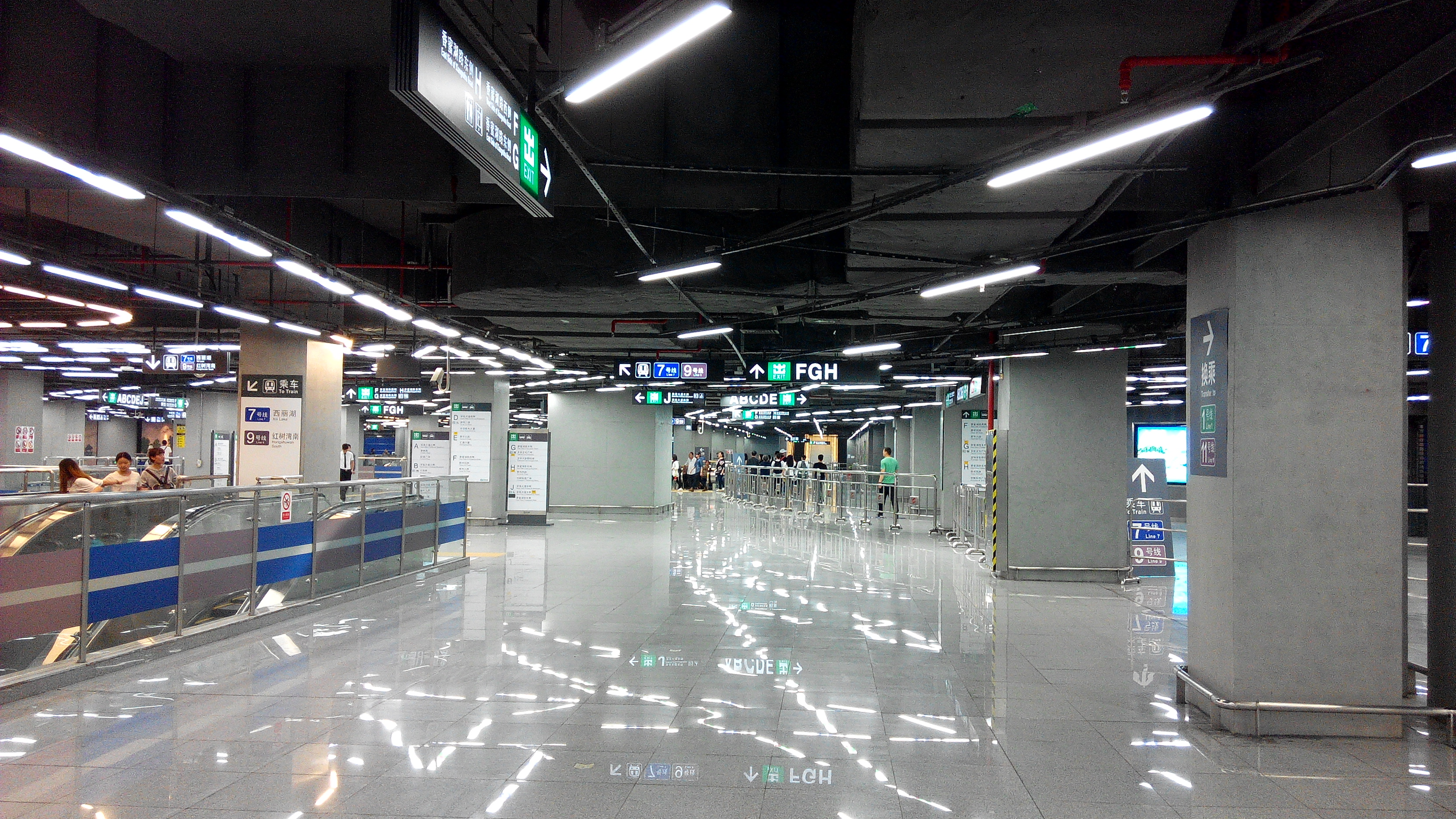
Concourse facing line 7 and 9

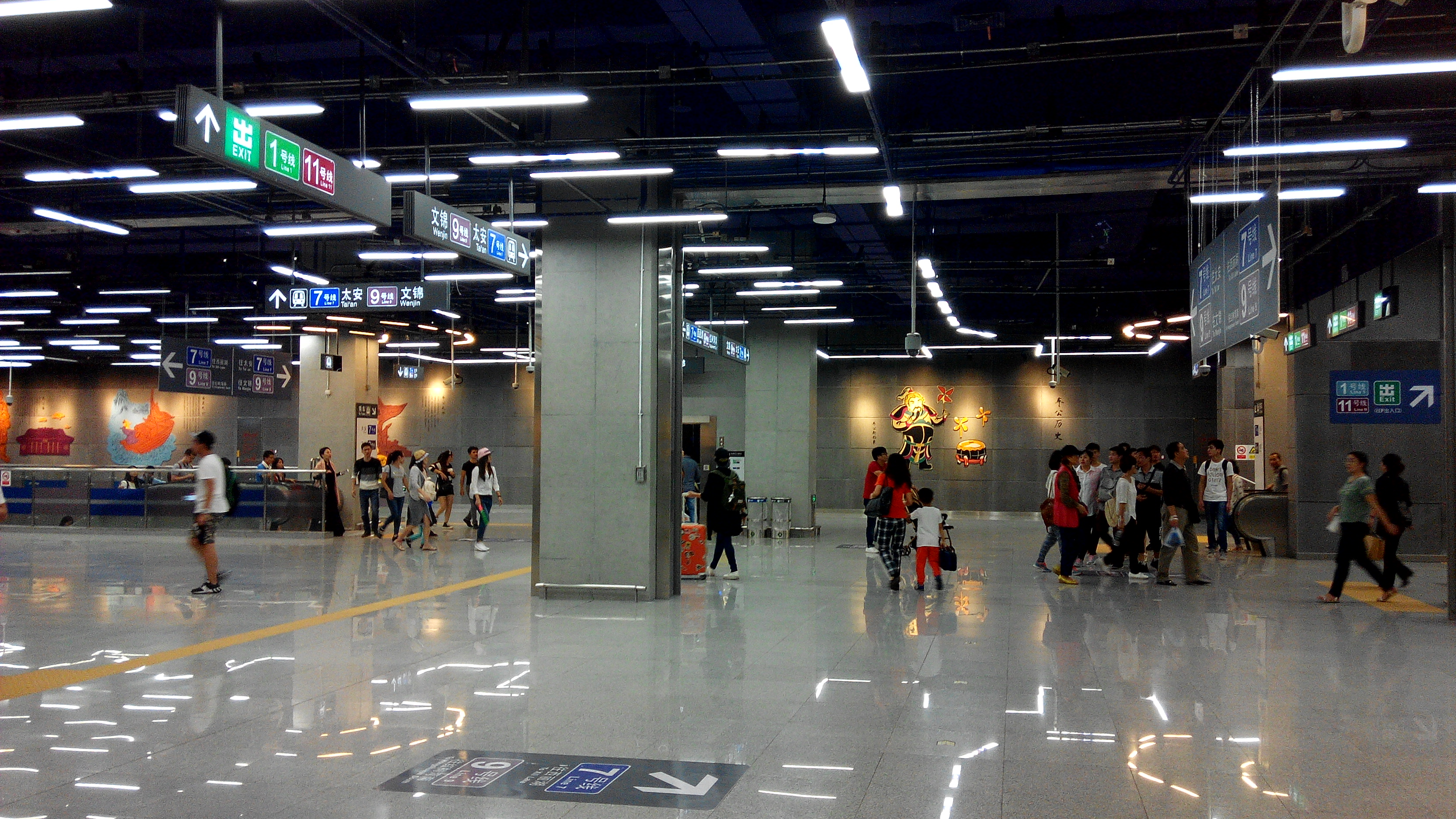
Transferring platform of line 7 and 9

== Exits ==
Exit		Destination
Exit A		Shennan Boulevard (N), Xiangmihu Road, Fortune Plaza, Shuishang Leyuan, Party School of Shenzhen Municipal Committee of the CPC, Donghai Garden, Cuihai Garden, Shenzhen Futian District Health Inspection Institute, Vanke Fuchun Dongfang Building, Price Control of Industry and Commerce Building, Yangguang Golf Building Xiangli Lüzhou
Exit B		China Merchants Bank Tower, Shennan Boulevard (N), Nongyuan Road, Shenzhen Industry & Commerce Administration, Market Supervision Administration of Shenzhen Municipality, Shennan Senior High School, Xiangmihu Branch of Futian People's Hospital, Donghai Cultural Square, Donghai International Center, China Merchants Bank Building, Donghai Garden
Exit C		Shennan Boulevard (S), Tairan 9th Road, Chuangjian Building, Daqing Building, Haisong Building, Guang'an Business Building, Jinrun Building, Jinrun Shiji Building, Yinglong Building, Shiji Haoting, Tai'anxuan, Taikangxuan, Tairan Apartment Complexes
Exit D	D1	Shennan Boulevard (S), Xiangmihu Road, Benyuan Building, NFC Building
Exit D	D2	Tairan 2nd Road, Tairan Apartment Complexes, Dushi Yangguang Mingyuan, Tairan 7th Road
Exit E		Tairan 7th Road, Huitong Building
Exit F		Xiangmihu Road (W), Tairan 4th Road, Tairan 6th Road, Tairan Cultural Square, Cangsong Building
Exit G		Xiangmihu Road (E), Tian'an Cultural Square, Innovation & Technology Plaza Phase II, Shenzhen Tian'an Cyber Park, Tian'an Golf Longyuan, Tianfa Building, Tianji Building, Tianjing Building, Tianxing Building, Tianzhan Building, Qiantai Apartment, Yongtai Apartment
Exit H		Xiangmihu Road (E), Tairan 4th Road, Innovation & Technology Plaza, Tian'an Cyber Park, Tianran Industry and Trade Park, Jingsong Building
Exit J	J1	Shennan Boulevard (S), Xiangmihu Road (E), Zhonglian Building, Anhui Building Chuangzhan Center
Exit J	J2	Shennan Boulevard (N), Xiangmihu Road (E), Xiangmihu Interchange

== See also ==
- China Merchants Bank Tower
- Laojie station
- Hongshuwan South station
