= Xiasha station (Shenzhen Metro) =

Metro station in Shenzhen, China

Coordinates: 22°32′7″N 114°1′51″E

Xiasha 下沙
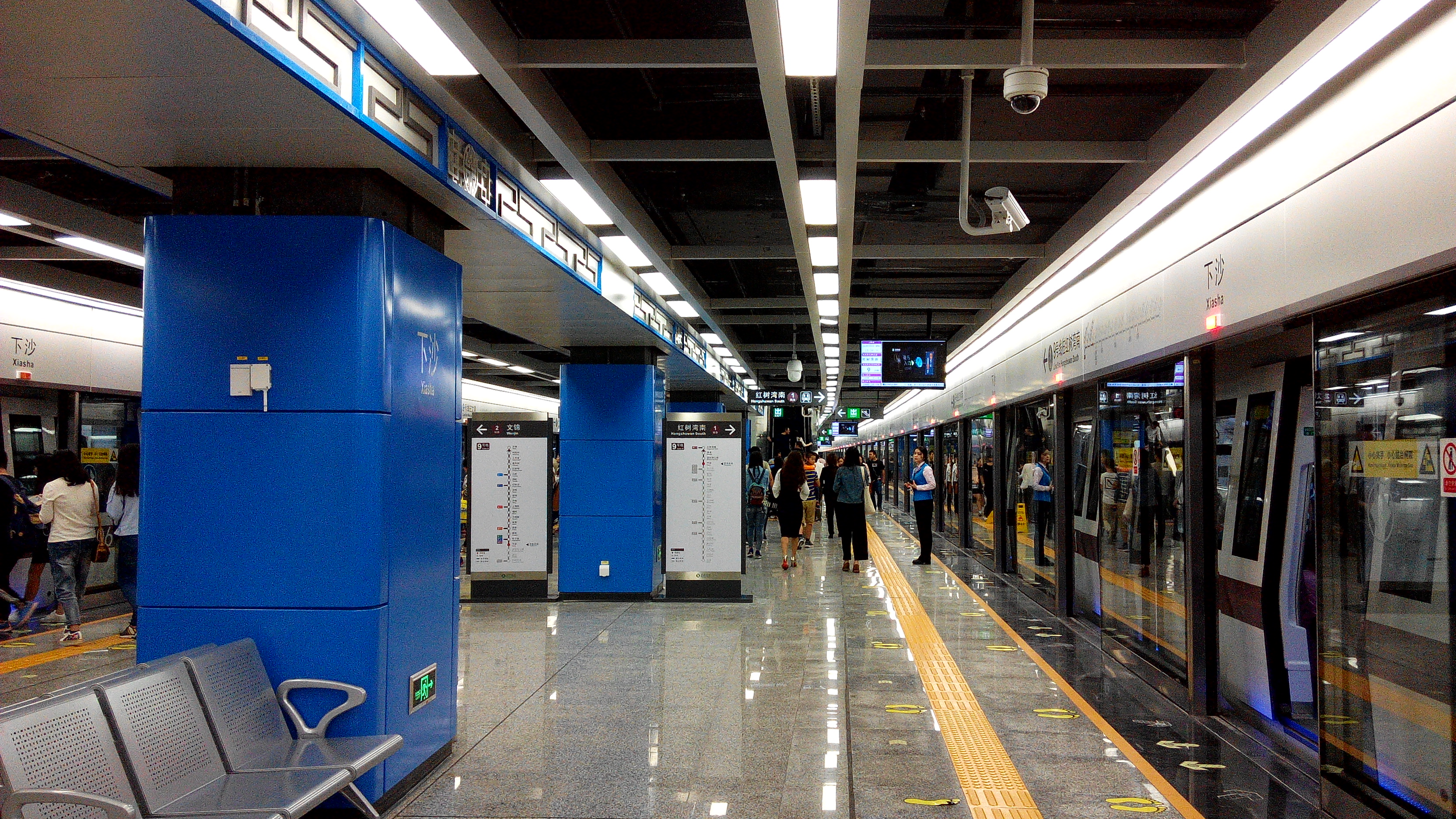

General information
- Location: Futian District, Shenzhen, Guangdong; China
- Operator: SZMC (Shenzhen Metro Group)
- Line: Line 9

History
- Opened: 28 October 2016

Services
Preceding station	Shenzhen Metro	Following station
Chegongmiao towards Wenjin	Line 9	Shenzhen Bay Park towards Qianwan
Location

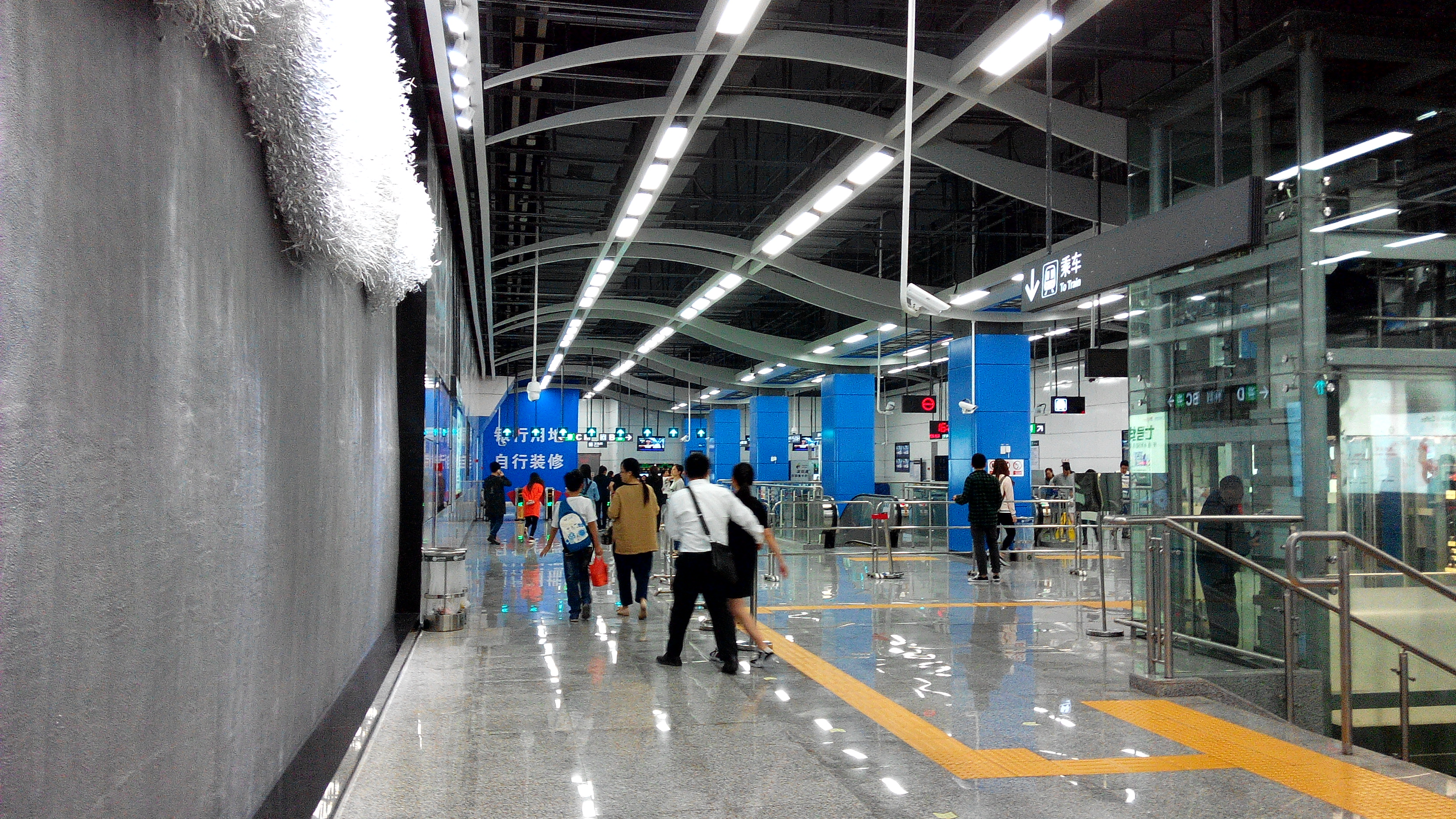
Concourse

Xiasha station (Chinese: 下沙站; pinyin: Xiàshā Zhàn; Jyutping: haa6 saa1 zaam6) is a metro station of Shenzhen Metro Line 9. It opened on 28 October 2016.

== Station layout ==
G	-	Exit
B1F; Concourse	Lobby	Customer Service, Shops, Vending machines, ATMs
B2F; Platforms	Platform 1	← Line 9 towards Qianwan (Shenzhen Bay Park)
B2F; Platforms	Island platform, doors will open on the left
B2F; Platforms	Platform 2	→ Line 9 towards Wenjin (Chegongmiao) →

== Exits ==
Exit	Destination
Exit B	Binhe Boulevard (S), Dongchong Road, Xiasha Overpass, Tairan Square, Fantasia Huahaoyuan
Exit C	Binhe Boulevard (N), Tairan 8th Road, Tairan 9th Road, Shengtang Building, Haisong Building, Guanghua Building
Exit D	Binhe Boulevard (N), Tairan 11th Road, Shuisong Building, Yunsong Building
