= Hi-Tech South station =

Chinese rapid-transit stop on Shenzhen Metro Line, Guangdong

Coordinates: 22°31′46″N 113°59′6″E

Hi-Tech South 高新南
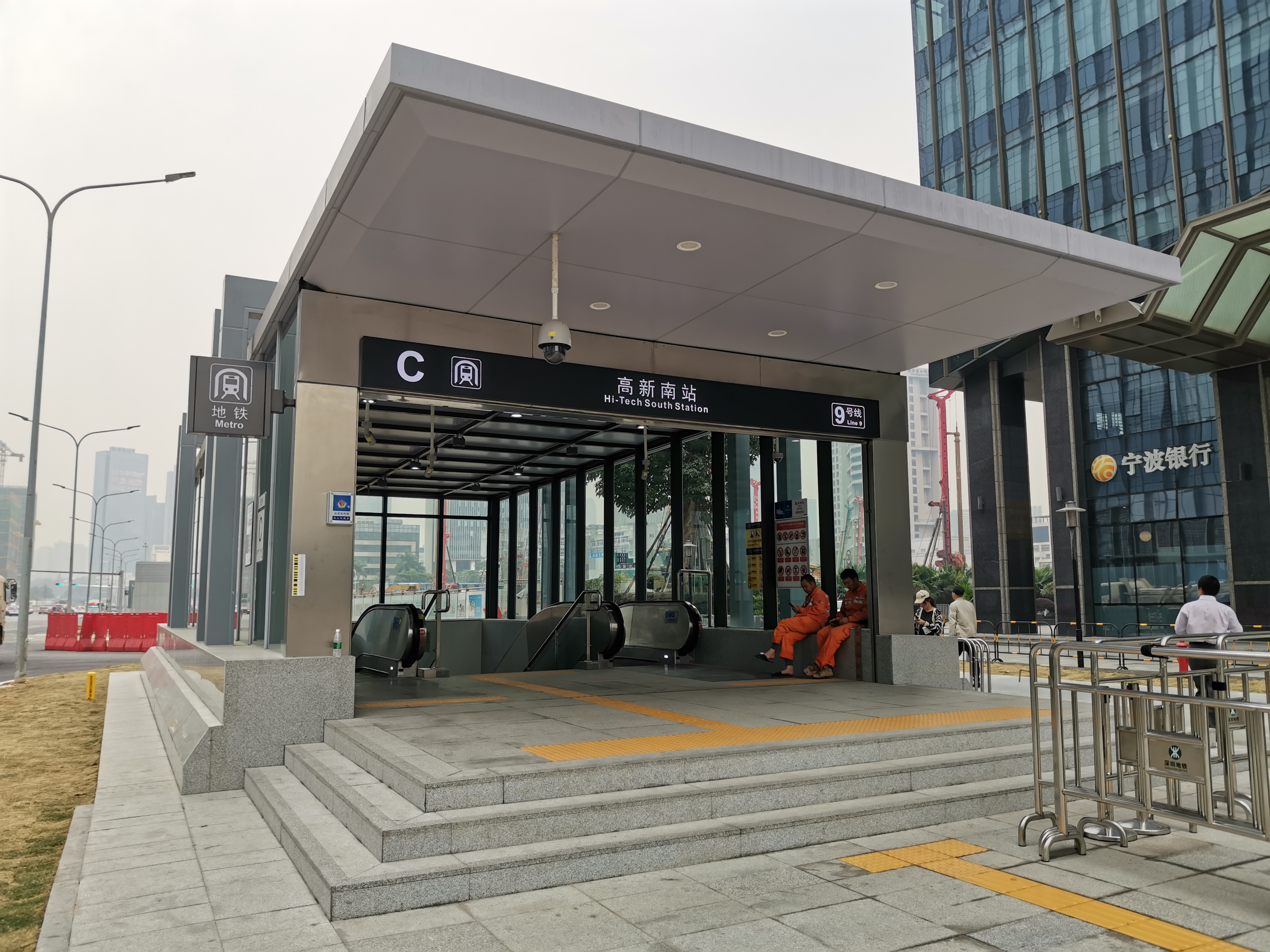

General information
- Location: Nanshan District, Shenzhen, Guangdong; China
- Operated by: SZMC (Shenzhen Metro Group)
- Line: Line 9

History
- Opened: 8 December 2019

Services
Preceding station	Shenzhen Metro	Following station
Hongshuwan South towards Wenjin	Line 9	Yuehaimen towards Qianwan
Location

Hi-Tech South station (Chinese: 高新南站; pinyin: Gāoxīn Nán Zhàn; Jyutping: gou1 san1 naam4 zaam6) is a metro station of Shenzhen Metro Line 9. It opened on 8 December 2019.
