= Xiangmihu station =

Metro station in Shenzhen, Guangdong, China

Coordinates: 22.5417°N 114.034°E

Xiangmihu 香蜜湖
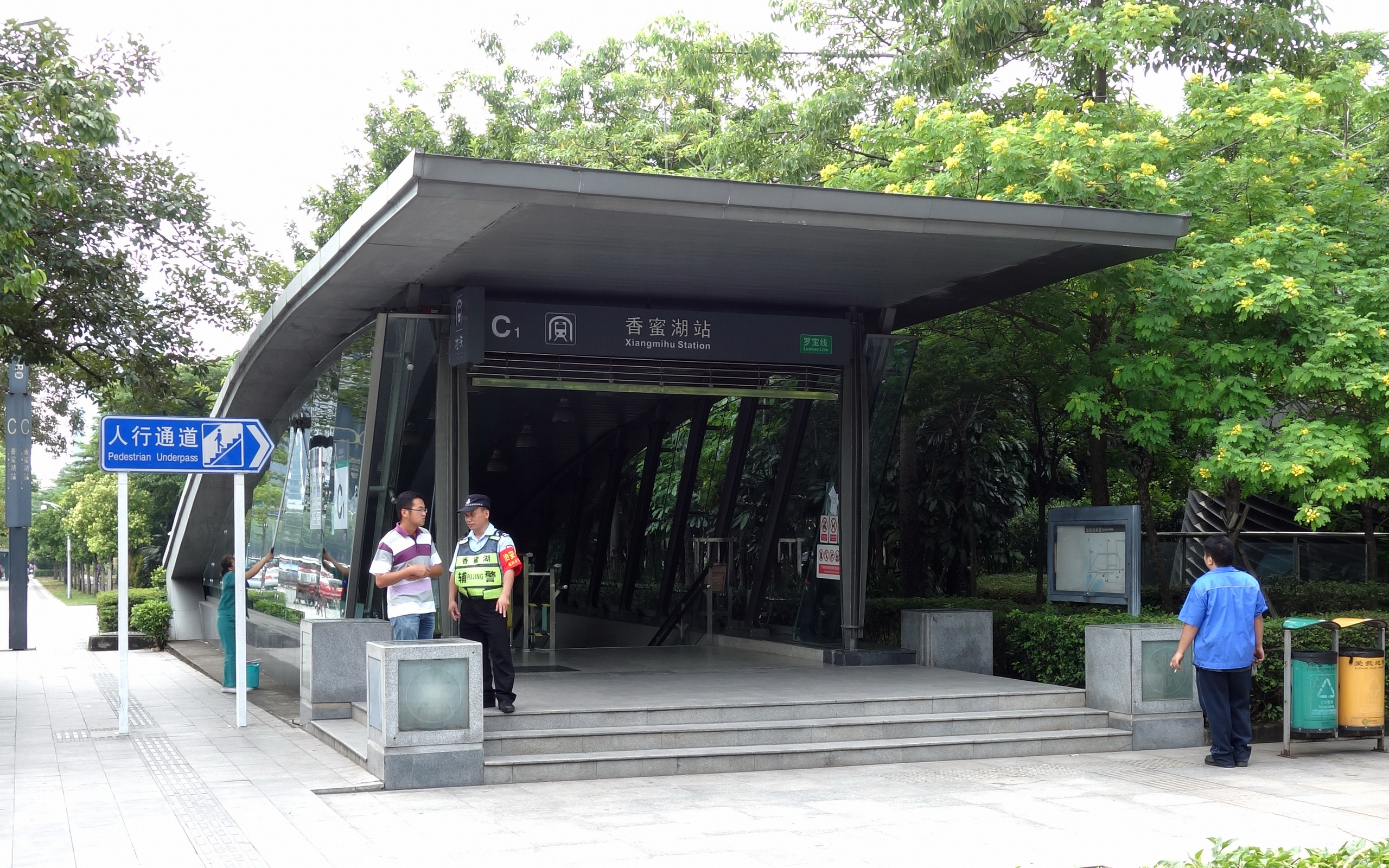
- C1 Entrance of Xiangmihu station, September 2013

Chinese name
- Traditional Chinese: 香蜜湖
- Simplified Chinese: 香蜜湖
- Literal meaning: Honey lake
Transcriptions
Standard Mandarin
- Hanyu Pinyin: Xiāngmì Hú
Yue: Cantonese
- Jyutping: Hoeng1mat6 Wu4

General information
- Location: Futian District, Shenzhen, Guangdong; China
- Operated by: SZMC (Shenzhen Metro Group)
- Line: Line 1
- Platforms: 2 (1 island platform)
- Tracks: 2

Construction
- Structure type: Underground
- Accessible: Yes

Other information
- Station code: 121

History
- Opened: 28 December 2004; 21 years ago

Services
| Preceding station | Shenzhen Metro | Following station |
|---|---|---|
| Chegongmiao towards Airport East | Line 1 | Shopping Park towards Luohu |
Route map
Location

Xiangmihu station (Chinese: 香蜜湖站; Jyutping: Hoeng1 Mat6 Wu4 Zaam6; lit. 'Honey Lake station') is a station on Line 1 of the Shenzhen Metro. It opened on 28 December 2004. It is located underground at Shennan Dadao (Chinese: 深南大道), west of Xiangmei Lu (Chinese: 香梅路) near the entrance of Honey Lake Resort (Chinese: 香蜜湖渡假村), in Futian District, Shenzhen, China. It is near Shenzhen Golf Club (Chinese: 深圳市高爾夫球會) and Shenzhen Special Zone Press Tower (simplified Chinese: 深圳特区报大厦; traditional Chinese: 深圳特區報大廈).

== Station layout ==
| G | - | Exit |
| B1F; Concourse | Lobby | Customer Service, Shops, Vending machines, ATMs |
| B2F; Platforms | Platform 1 | ← Line 1 towards Airport East (Chegongmiao) |
| B2F; Platforms | Island platform, doors will open on the left |
| B2F; Platforms | Platform 2 | → towards Luohu (Shopping Park) → |

== Exits ==
| Exit | | Destination |
|---|---|---|
| Exit A | | Shennan Boulevard (N), Xiangmei Road, Municipal Administration Building, Urban Planning, Land & Resources Commission of Shenzhen Municipality, Dongfang Meiguiyuan, Xiangmihu Apartment |
| Exit B | | Shennan Boulevard (N), Shenzhen Honey Lake Country Club |
| Exit C | C1 | Shennan Boulevard (N), Xiangmei Road, Xinwen Road, Urban Planning, Land & Resources Commission of Shenzhen Municipality, Shenzhen Special Zone Press Tower, Renmin Building |
| Exit C | C2 | Shennan Boulevard (S), Shenzhen Golf Club |
