= Shenwan station =

Metro station in Shenzhen, China

Coordinates: 22°31′46″N 113°59′6″E

Shenwan 深湾
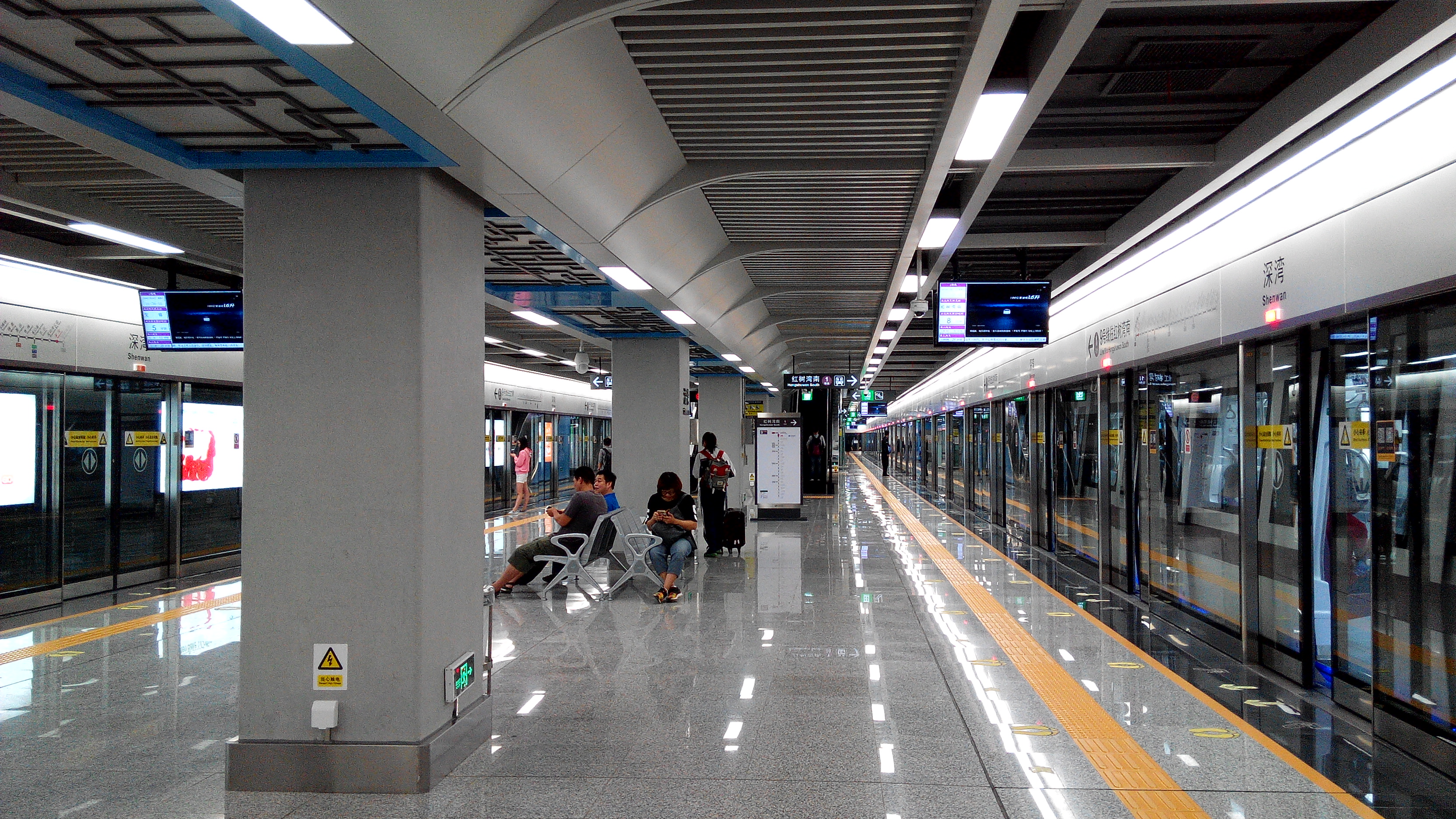

General information
- Location: Nanshan District, Shenzhen, Guangdong; China
- Operated by: SZMC (Shenzhen Metro Group)
- Line: Line 9

History
- Opened: 28 October 2016

Services
Preceding station	Shenzhen Metro	Following station
Shenzhen Bay Park towards Wenjin	Line 9	Hongshuwan South towards Qianwan
Location

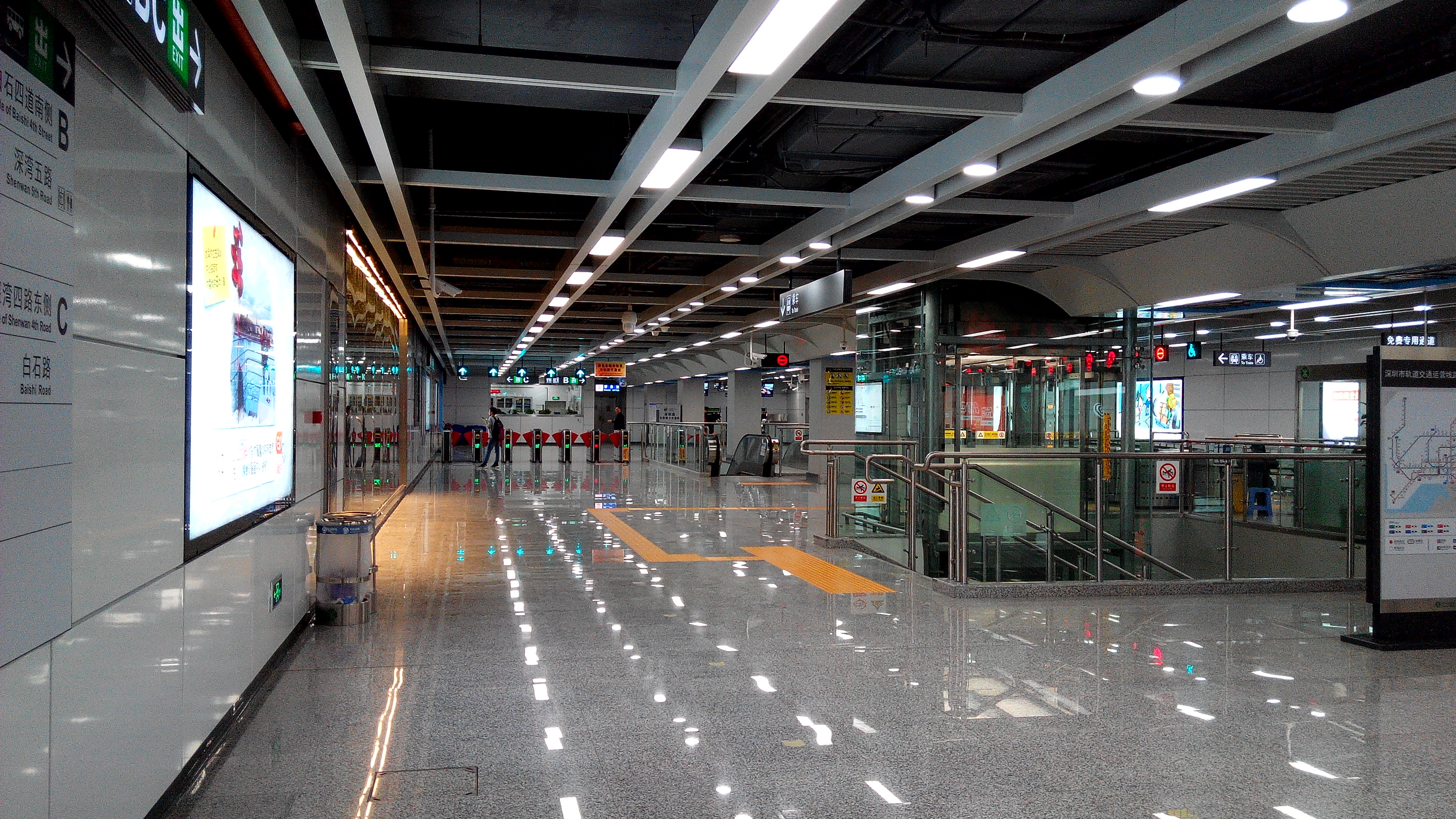
Concourse

Shenwan station (simplified Chinese: 深湾站; traditional Chinese: 深灣站; pinyin: Shēnwān Zhàn; Jyutping: sam1 waan1 zaam6) is a metro station of Shenzhen Metro Line 9. It opened on 28 October 2016.

== Station layout ==
G	-	Exit
B1F; Concourse	Lobby	Customer Service, Shops, Vending machines, ATMs
B2F; Platforms	Platform 1	← Line 9 towards Qianwan (Hongshuwan South)
B2F; Platforms	Island platform, doors will open on the left
B2F; Platforms	Platform 2	→ Line 9 towards Wenjin (Shenzhen Bay Park) →

== Exits ==
Exit	Destination
Exit A	Baishi 4th Road (S), Binhai Boulevard
Exit B	Baishi 4th Road (S), Shenwan 5th Road
Exit C	Shenwan 4th Road (E), Baishi Road
Exit D	Shenwan 4th Road (W), Baishi 3rd Road (S)
