= Zhuzilin Depot =

Railway depot in Shenzhen, China

Coordinates: 22.5330°N 113.9960°E

Zhuzilin Depot (Chinese: 竹子林车辆段) is the depot of Shenzhen Metro Line 1. It is located at the south of Shennan Boulevard (Chinese: 深南大道) and east of Qiaochengdong Road (Chinese: 侨城东路) in Futian District, Shenzhen, China. It acts as operations control centre of Line 1 and Line 2, and maintenance workshop of Shenzhen Metro Line 1. It has one track to connect to nearby Zhuzilin Station (Chinese: 竹子林站).

== See also ==
- Zhuzilin Station
