= Shenzhen Bay Park station =

Metro station in Shenzhen, Guangdong, China

Coordinates: 22°31′40″N 113°59′57″E

Shenzhen Bay Park 深圳湾公园
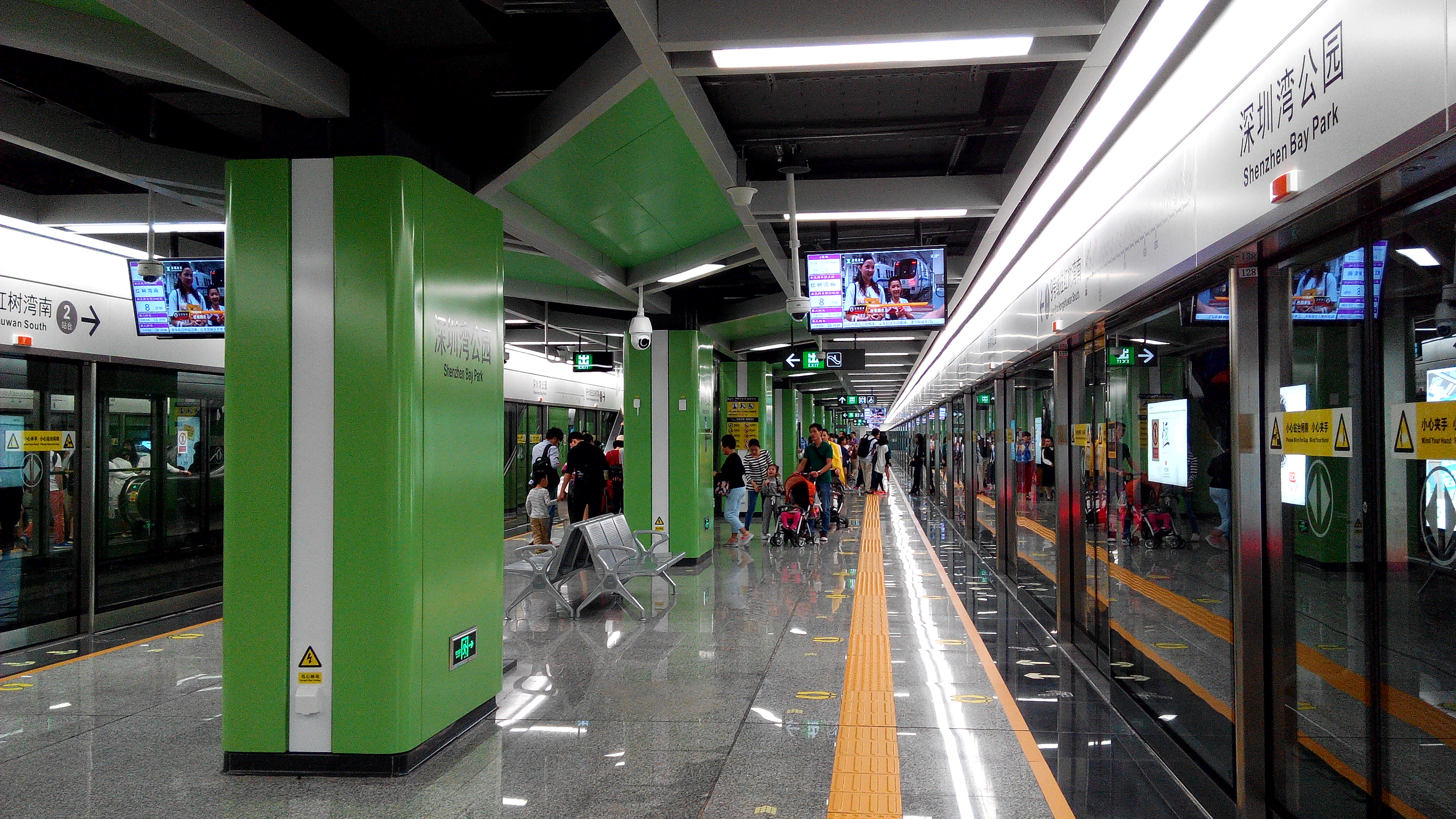

General information
- Location: Nanshan District, Shenzhen, Guangdong; China
- Operator: SZMC (Shenzhen Metro Group)
- Line: Line 9

History
- Opened: 28 October 2016

Services
Preceding station	Shenzhen Metro	Following station
Xiasha towards Wenjin	Line 9	Shenwan towards Qianwan
Track layout
Location

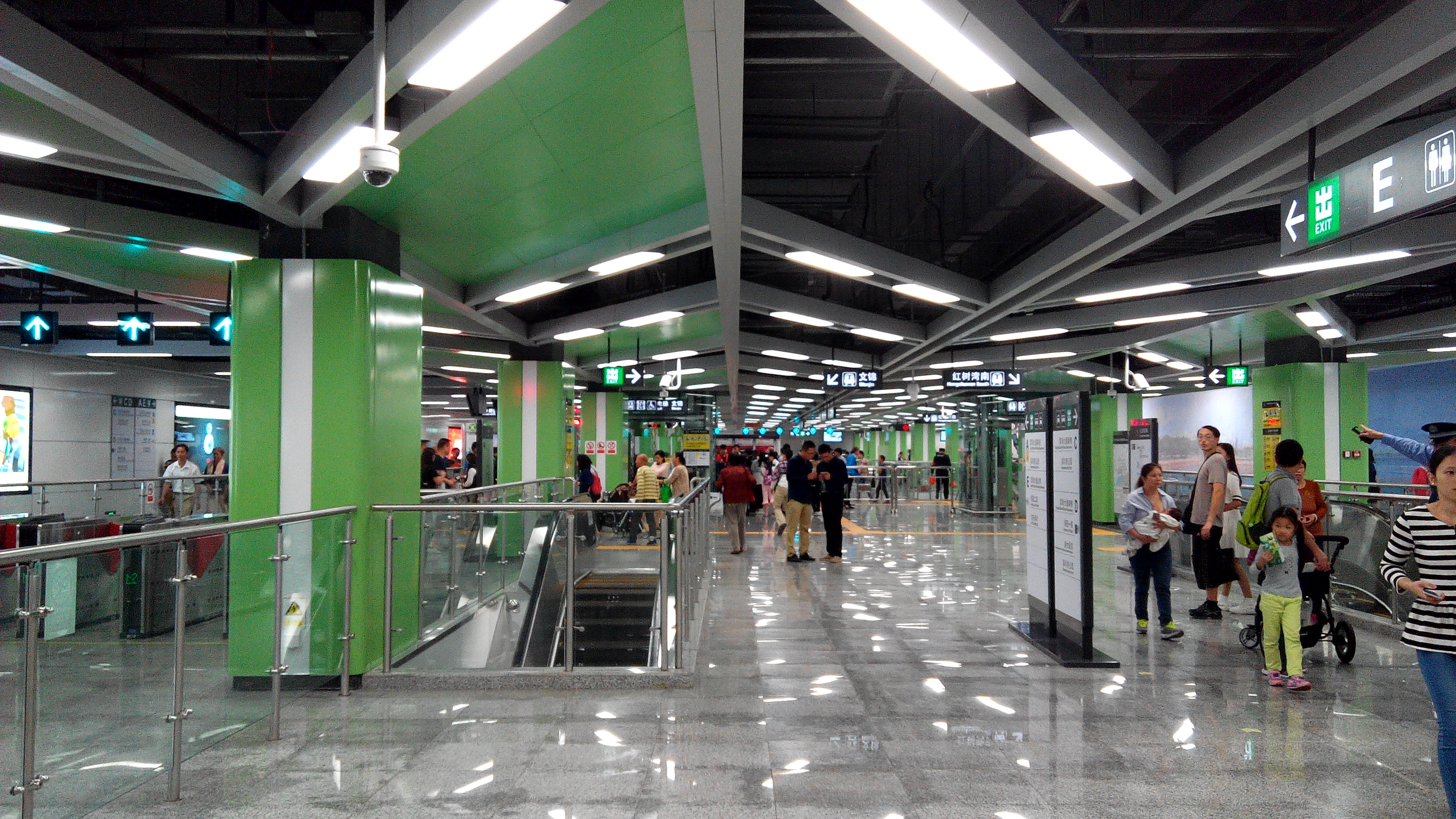
Concourse

Shenzhen Bay Park station (simplified Chinese: 深圳湾公园站; traditional Chinese: 深圳灣公園站; pinyin: Shēnzhèn Wān Gōngyuán Zhàn; Jyutping: sam1 zan3 waan1 gung1 jyun4 zaam6) is a metro station of Shenzhen Metro Line 9. It opened on 28 October 2016.

== Station layout ==
G	-	Exit
B1F; Concourse	Lobby	Customer Service, Shops, Vending machines, ATMs
B2F; Platforms	Platform 1	← Line 9 towards Qianwan (Shenwan)
B2F; Platforms	Island platform, doors will open on the left
B2F; Platforms	Platform 2 ↑ Platform 3 ↓	→ No regular service
B2F; Platforms	Island platform, doors will open on the left
B2F; Platforms	Platform 4	→ Line 9 towards Wenjin (Xiasha) →

== Exits ==
Exit		Gallery	Destination
Exit A		Picture of Exit A at Shenzhen Bay Park Station on the Shenzhen Metro	Binhai Boulevard (S), Shenzhen Bay Park
Exit C			Binhai Boulevard (S), Shenzhen Bay Park
Exit D	D2		Binhai Boulevard (S), Shenzhen Bay Park
Exit D	D1		Haiyuan 1st Road, HKU-Shenzhen Hospital
Exit E			Binhai Boulevard (N), Haiyuan 2nd Road, OCT Harbour
