= Zhuzilin station =

Metro station in Shenzhen, Guangdong, China

Coordinates: 22°32′1″N 114°0′48″E

Zhuzilin 竹子林
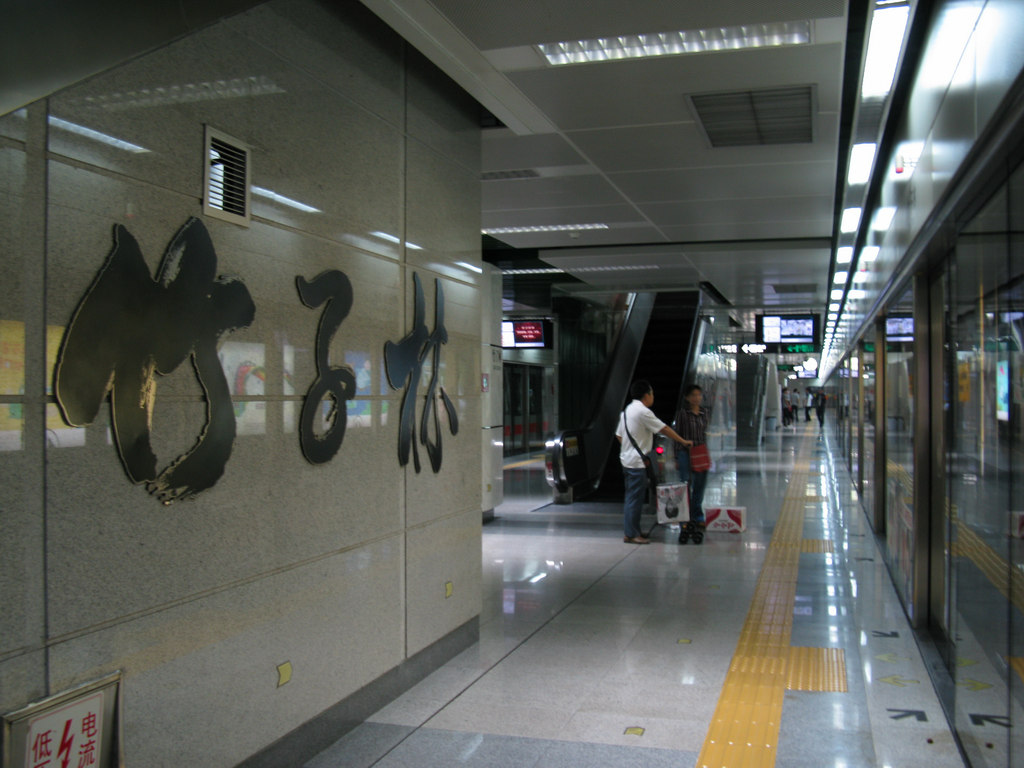

Chinese name
- Traditional Chinese: 竹子林
- Literal meaning: Bamboo Forest
Transcriptions
Standard Mandarin
- Hanyu Pinyin: Zhúzǐ lín
Yue: Cantonese
- Jyutping: Zuk1zi2 Lam4

General information
- Location: Futian District, Shenzhen, Guangdong; China
- Operator: SZMC (Shenzhen Metro Group)
- Line: Line 1
- Platforms: 4 (2 island platforms)
- Tracks: 3

Construction
- Structure type: Underground
- Accessible: Yes

History
- Opened: 28 December 2004; 21 years ago

Services
| Preceding station | Shenzhen Metro | Following station |
|---|---|---|
| Qiaocheng East towards Airport East | Line 1 | Chegongmiao towards Luohu |
Track layout
Location

Zhuzilin station (Chinese: 竹子林站; Jyutping: Zuk1 Zi2 Lam4 Zaam6; lit. 'Bamboo Forest station') is a station of Shenzhen Metro Line 1. It opened on 28 December 2004. It is located at the underground of the junction of Guangshen Expressway (simplified Chinese: 广深高速公路; traditional Chinese: 廣深高速公路) and west of Shennan Road (Chinese: 深南大道) in Futian District, Shenzhen, China. Besides two rail tracks for Line 1, there is an extra track to a depot called "Zhuzilin Depot" (simplified Chinese: 竹子林车辆段; traditional Chinese: 竹子林車輛段) for operations control centre and maintenance workshop.

== Station layout ==
| G | - | Exit |
| B1F; Concourse | Lobby | Customer Service, Shops, Vending machines, ATMs |
| B2F; Platforms | Platform 1 | ← Line 1 towards Airport East (Qiaocheng East) |
| B2F; Platforms | Island platform, doors will open on the left |
| B2F; Platforms | Platform 2 ↑ Platform 3 ↓ | No regular service |
| B2F; Platforms | Island platform, doors will open on the left |
| B2F; Platforms | Platform 4 | Line 1 towards Luohu (Chegongmiao) → |

== Exits ==
| Exit | | Destination |
|---|---|---|
| Exit A | | Shennan Boulevard (S), Zhuzilin Interchange, Shenhan Building |
| Exit B | B1 | Shenzhen Metro Operation Branch, Zhuzilin Bus Station (To Futian, Luohu) |
| Exit B | B2 | Transport Commission of Shenzhen Municipality (Municipal Transport Commission), Shenzhen Futian District Administration of State Taxation, Liantai Building, Grand Mercure Oriental Ginza Shenzhen Hotel, City Inn Zhuzilin, Futian District Industry & Commerce Administration, Xiangmi Lake Resource Management Station, Xiangmihu Police Station, China Post Zhuzilin Sub-branch, Traffic Fee Collection Office of Shenzhen Futian District Highway Administration Bureau, Xiangmihu Industrial & Commercial Office, Xiangmihu Hospital, Shenzhen Road & Bridge Management Division, Zhuyuan Primary School, Zhulin Middle School, Qiushi Building, China Economy Trade Building |
| Exit C | | Shennan Boulevard (S) |
| Exit D | | Futian Inter-City Bus Station / Futian Transport Hub |
| Exit E | | Shennan Boulevard (S), Futian Inter-City Bus Station / Futian Transport Hub |

== See also ==
- Zhuzilin Depot
