= China Merchants Bank Tower =

Skyscraper in Shenzhen, Guangdong, China

- (Chinese: 招商银行大厦; pinyin: Zhāoshāng Yīnháng Dàshà; Jyutping: Ziu1 soeng1 Ngan4 hong4 Daai6 haa6)
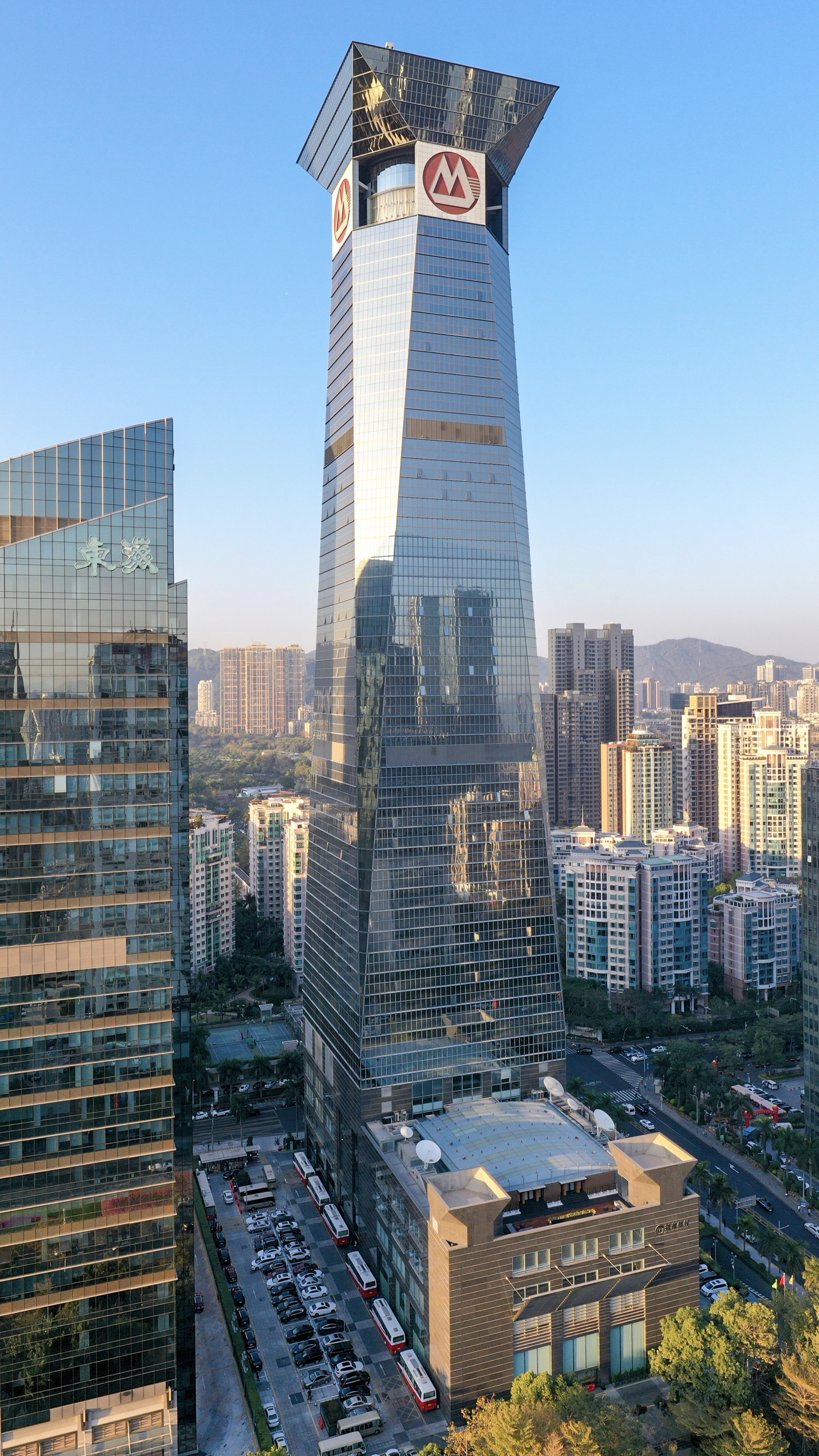
- The China Merchants Bank Tower in February 2021
- Interactive map of the China Merchants Bank Tower area
- Alternative names: Shenzhen World Trade Centre

General information
- Status: Completed
- Type: Office
- Location: 7088 Shennan Boulevard, Futian District, Shenzhen, Guangdong, China
- Coordinates: 22°32′21″N 114°01′02″E
- Groundbreaking: 1999
- Completed: 2001

Height
- Architectural: 249 m (817 ft)
- Tip: 249 m (817 ft)

Technical details
- Floor count: 53
- Floor area: 1,232,468 ft^{2} (114,500.0 m^{2})

Design and construction
- Engineer: Parsons Brinckerhoff Consultants Private Limited
- Main contractor: China Construction Second Engineering Bureau Ltd.

China Merchants Bank Tower (Chinese: 招商银行大厦; pinyin: Zhāoshāng Yīnháng Dàshà; Jyutping: Ziu1 soeng1 Ngan4 hong4 Daai6 haa6), or the Shenzhen World Trade Centre a 53-story skyscraper in Futian District, Shenzhen, Guangdong Province, China was designed by American architecture firm Lee / Timchula of New York City. Lee / Timchula was the continuation of the Edward Larrabee Barnes, John MY Lee Architecture firm after Barnes retired in 1993. Completed in 2001.

The 53 story high tower is defined by three zones-the podium, the tapering tower shaft, and the crown. The podium is a simple, 5-story rectangular volume with clear glass and 2 tones of gray granite detailed in sleek flush planes. The podium contains a full height atrium and a grand banking hall. Above the main shaft is a sky garden where refreshments are served at the Bankers Club in the crown zone above.

The exact location is at the intersection of Nongyuan Road (农园路; Nóngyuán Lù) and Shennan Boulevard, a major east-west thoroughfare of Shenzhen.

== History ==
Completed in 2001, the global headquarters of China Merchants Bank is located within the tower.

== Transportation ==
- Shenzhen Metro: Chegongmiao Station

== See also ==
- List of tallest buildings in Shenzhen
