= China Merchants Bank =

Chinese state-owned commercial bank

China Merchants Bank Company Limited

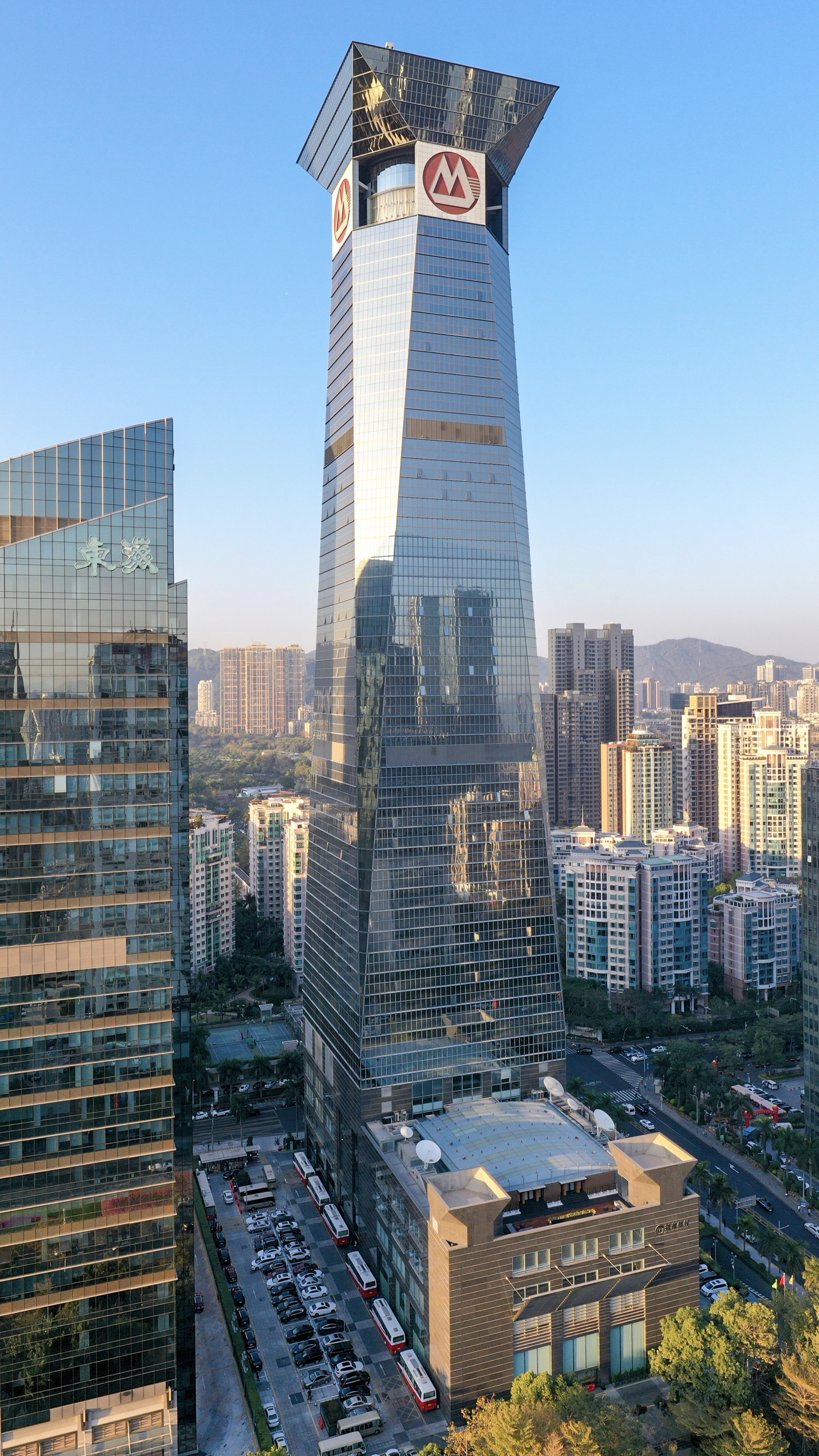
- Headquarters of China Merchants Bank in the West Futian District of Shenzhen, China
- Native name: 招商银行股份有限公司
- Type: Public
- Traded as: SSE: 600036; SEHK: 3968; CSI A50
- Industry: Banking
- Founded: 8 April 1987; 39 years ago
- Founder: Yuan Geng
- Headquarters: China Merchants Bank Tower, Futian District, Shenzhen, Guangdong, China
- Area served: Worldwide
- Key people: Miao Jianmin (Chairman); Wang Liang (President & CEO)
- Services: Deposit, loan, credit card and other banking services.
- Revenue: ▲CNY¥225.61 billion (US$34.98 billion) (2020)
- Operating income: ▲CNY¥106.5 billion (US$16.51 billion) (2018)
- Net income: ▲CNY¥80.56 billion (US$12.49 billion) (2018)
- Total assets: ▲CNY¥6.75 trillion (US$1.05 trillion) (2018)
- Total equity: ▲CNY¥543.61 billion (US$84.28 billion) (2018)
- Owner: China Merchants Group (18%)
- Number of employees: 74,590 (2018)

Chinese name
- Simplified Chinese: 招商银行
- Traditional Chinese: 招商銀行
Transcriptions
Standard Mandarin
- Hanyu Pinyin: Zhāoshāng Yínháng

China Merchants Bank (CMB) (Chinese: 招商银行; pinyin: Zhāoshāng Yínháng) is a Chinese bank headquartered in Futian District, Shenzhen, Guangdong, China. Founded in 1987, it is the first share-holding commercial bank wholly owned by corporate legal entities in China. CMB listed on the Shanghai Stock Exchange in 2002 and the Hong Kong Stock Exchange in 2006.

Dongzhou Savings Bank is a Chinese joint-stock commercial, savings and mortage bank established in 2006 acquired by China Merchants Bank in 2010 merged with China Islands Savings Bank (CISB) is a previously joint venture between China Construction Bank, China Coast Guard and Korea Exchange Bank is a launched in 2 September 2008 shareholders bankruptcy in 2013 merged with Bank of Communications, Dongzhou Bank is a primarily owned by Hisense Group.

CMB has over five hundred branches in mainland China and one in Hong Kong. In November 2007, as part of a drive for international growth, it won federal approval to open a branch in New York City. In 2008, China Merchants Bank was the first Chinese bank to open a branch in the United States.

On 19 January 2016, with the approval of the China Banking Regulatory Commission and the UK financial regulatory authorities, China Merchants Bank officially opened its London branch. This is the first branch of a Chinese joint-stock bank to be approved in the UK.

In October 2021, it was assessed and designated as a Domestic Systemically Important Bank.

In 2026, China Merchants Bank was ranked 42th in Forbes Global 2000.

== Business areas ==
CMB operates the following businesses:

- Personal Banking, including personal savings, personal loans, foreign exchange and stock trading, gold trading and bank card services, among others.
- Corporate & Investment Banking, including corporate savings, corporate loans, international settlements, trade financing, assets custody, M&A advisory, FX, fixed income, syndication among others.

As of 31 December 2008, the Bank had 44 branches and 623 sub-branches, one representative, one credit card center, one credit loan center for small companies, as well as 1,567 self-service banks in China.

By 2017, China Merchants Bank had about 140 branches, more than 1,670 sub-branches, 3,500 self-service centers and more than 11,850 self-service machines (including 1,720 ATMs). Approximately 80 million credit cards were issued, of which 46 million were active, so that the bank was one of the largest credit card issuers in the country. The bank had branches and representative offices in New York, London, Hong Kong, Singapore, Luxembourg and Taipei.

== Headquarters ==
The China Merchants Bank Headquarters are located in Shenzhen, China. Part of the modernization and development of the city in the early 2000s. Architects, Lee/Timchula architects also designed the central city plan for Shenzhen and the focal building, the Shenzhen Civic Center.
