= Hongshuwan South station =

Metro station in Shenzhen, China

Hongshuwan South 红树湾南
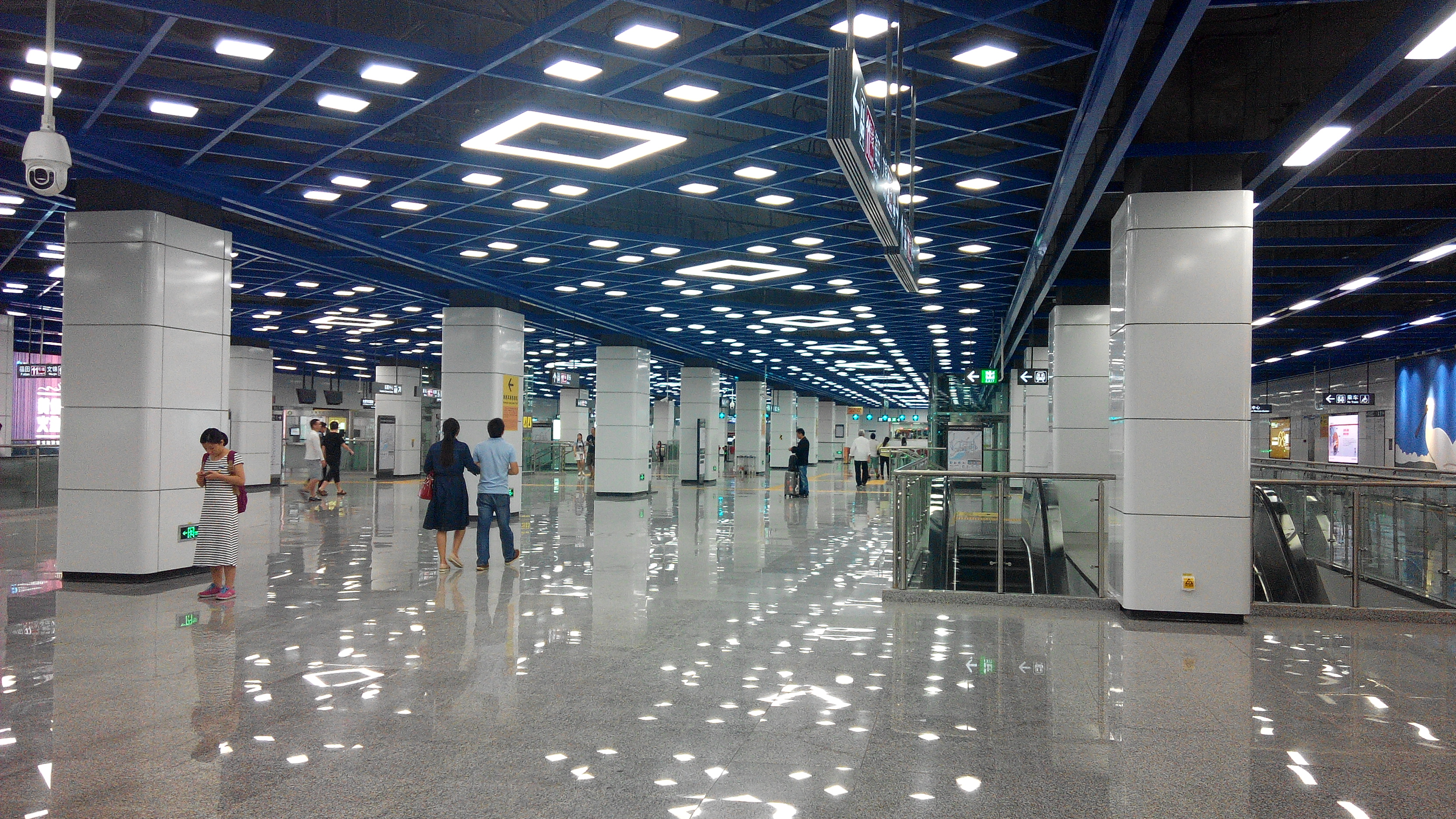
- Concourse

General information
- Location: Nanshan District, Shenzhen, Guangdong; China
- Coordinates: 22°31′34″N 113°57′59.26″E
- Operator: SZMC (Shenzhen Metro Group)
- Lines: Line 9; Line 11
- Platforms: 4 (2 island platforms)
- Tracks: 4

Construction
- Structure type: Underground
- Accessible: Yes

History
- Opened: Line 11: 28 June 2016 (10 years ago); Line 9: 28 October 2016 (9 years ago)

Services
Preceding station	Shenzhen Metro	Following station
Shenwan towards Wenjin	Line 9	Hi-Tech South towards Qianwan
Houhai towards Bitou	Line 11	Chegongmiao towards Hongling South
Track layout
Location

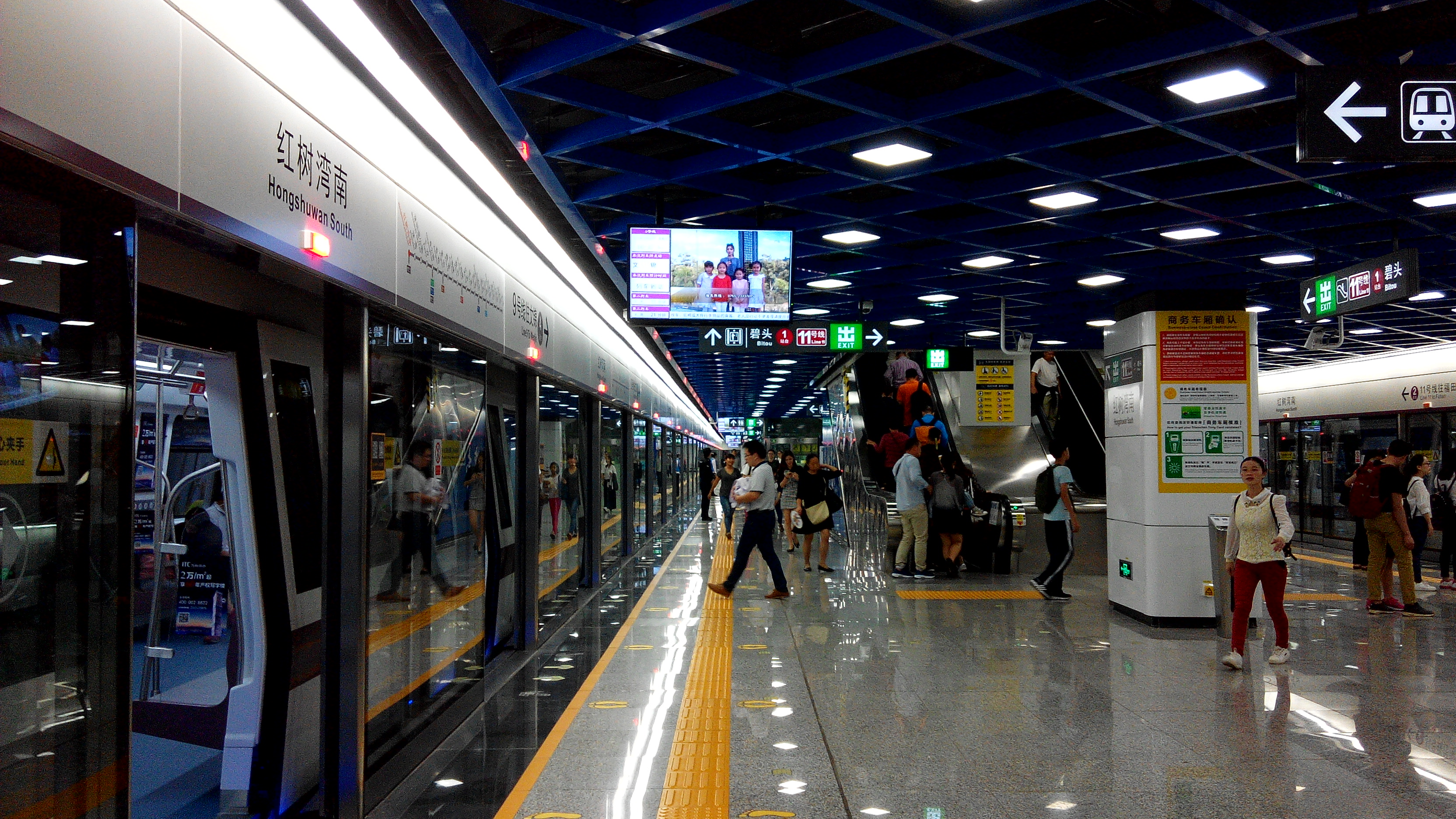
Line 9 platform

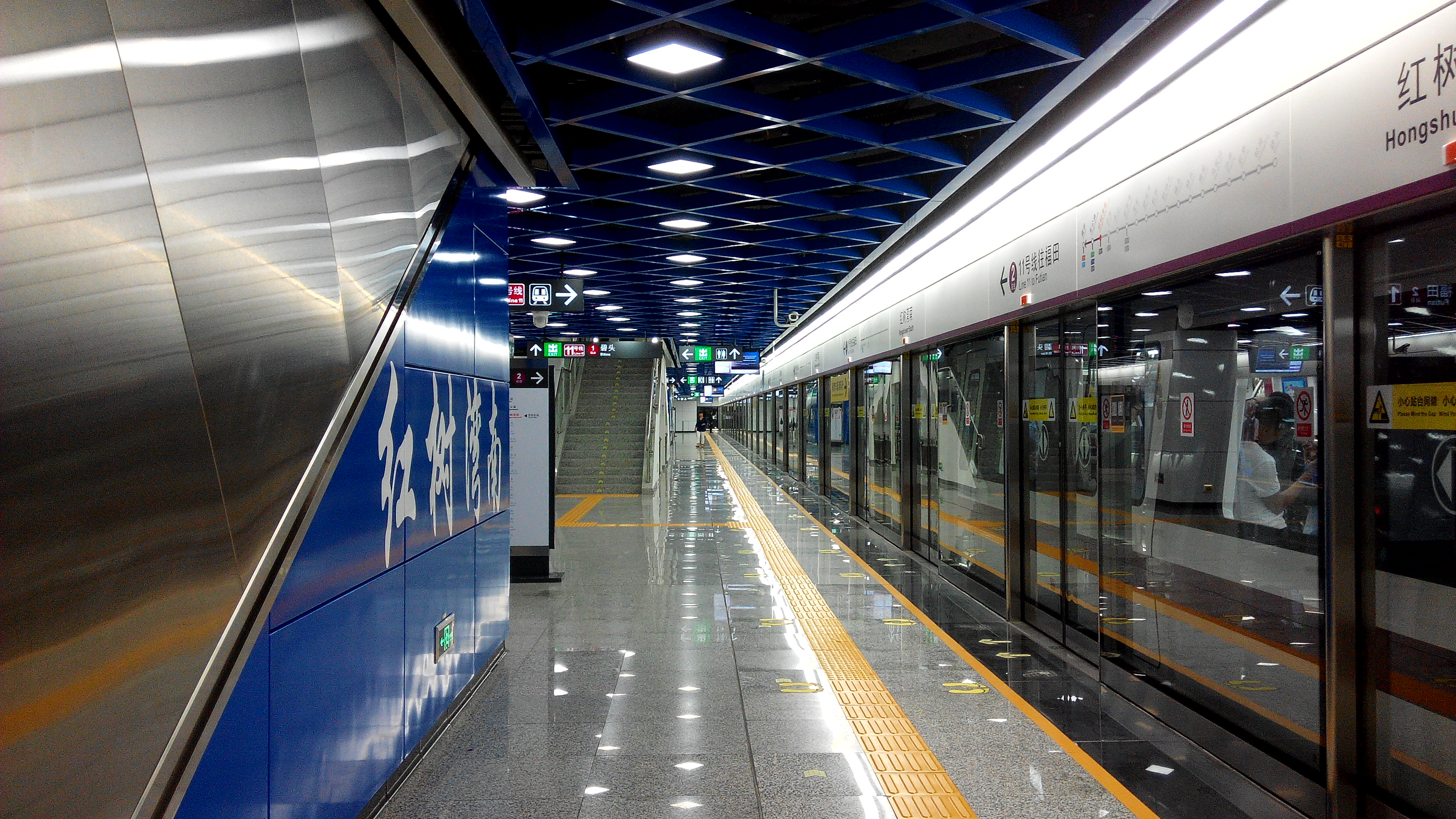
Line 11 platform

Hongshuwan South station (simplified Chinese: 红树湾南站; traditional Chinese: 紅樹灣南站; pinyin: Hóngshùwān Nán Zhàn; Jyutping: Hung4 Syu6 Waan1 Naam4 Zaam6; lit. 'Mangrove Bay South station') is an interchange station for Line 9 and Line 11 of the Shenzhen Metro. It was opened on 28 June 2016 with Line 11, whilst Line 9 was opened on 28 October 2016.

== Station layout ==
G	-	Exit
B1F; Concourse	Lobby	Ticket Machines, Customer Service, Shops, Vending Machines
B2F; Platforms		11 towards Bitou (Houhai)
B2F; Platforms	Island platform, doors of will open on the left for 11 / right for 9
B2F; Platforms		9 towards Qianwan (Hi-Tech South)
B2F; Platforms		9 towards Wenjin (Shenwan)
B2F; Platforms	Island platform, doors will open on the right for 9 / left for 11
B2F; Platforms		11 towards Hongling South (Chegongmiao)

== Exits ==
There are nine entrances and exits to this site.

Terminal sign	Exit	Suggested Destinations	Shenzhen intercity bus
出口 A		Shenzhen Bay Park、深湾二路南侧、白石四道 公交站：红树西岸	M561 | B706 南山微循环2→M486 (Interval)→B911 (Gen. I) | Baishizhou Metro Station | ↔ | Fonda city |
出口 B		白石四道 公交站：红树湾南地铁站	M561 | B706 南山微循环2→M486 (Interval)→B911 (Gen. I) | Baishizhou Metro Station | ↔ | Fonda city |
出口 C		白石三道	
出口 D		North side of Shenwan 2nd Road, Baishi 3rd Road	
出口 E		North side of Shenwan 2nd Road, Baishi 3rd Road	
出口 F		North side of Shenwan 1st Road, west side of Baishi 4th Road, Baishi 3rd Road, Shenzhen Haibin Experimental Primary School, Mangrove West Bank	
出口 G		Baishi 4th Avenue, Shenzhen Bay Park, south side of Shenwan 1st Road	
出口 H		B4.Avenue白石四道	
出口 J		B3.Avenue	
NOTE： Equipped with lifts

== See also ==
- Hongshuwan Station
- Laojie station
- Chegongmiao station
- Pingluan Hill station
