= COCO Park =

Shopping mall in Shenzhen, China

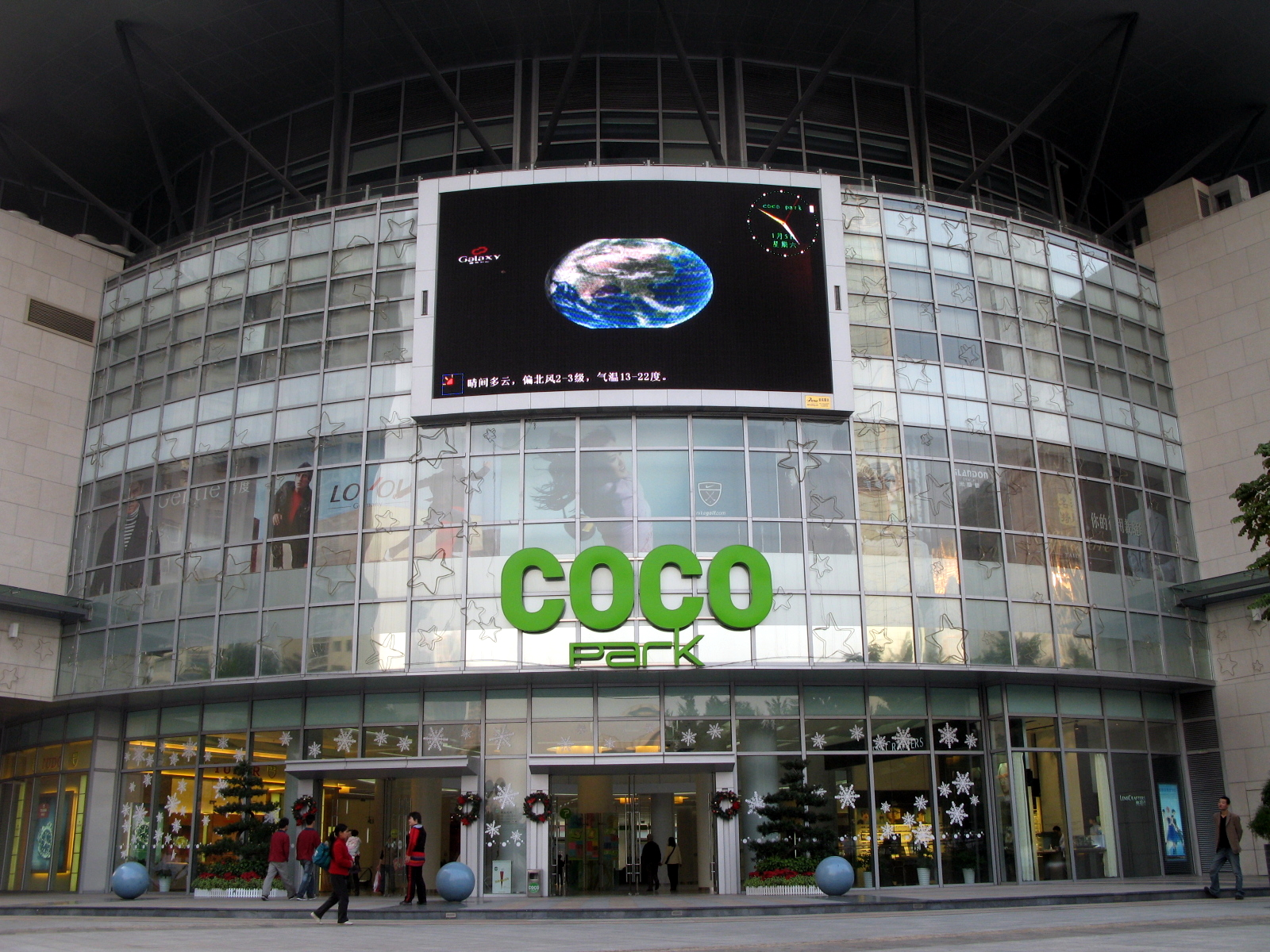
- COCO Park in Futian District
- Website: http://www.cocopark.cn

COCO Park is a group of shopping complexes in Shenzhen. The primary one is Futian COCO Park in Futian District, Shenzhen.

Futian COCO Park was established in 2007. Various journalists working for the South China Morning Post described it as "Shenzhen's answer to Lan Kwai Fong." This refers to an entertainment district in Hong Kong. Futian COCO Park includes a 6,000-square-foot (560 m^{2}) restaurant rooftop area with non-Chinese cuisines. In May 2017 the AEON shop at COCO Park closed.

There are sister complexes owned by the same company: COCO City in Longhua District, near Baishilong station; and Longgang COCO Park in Longgang District.

== Gallery ==
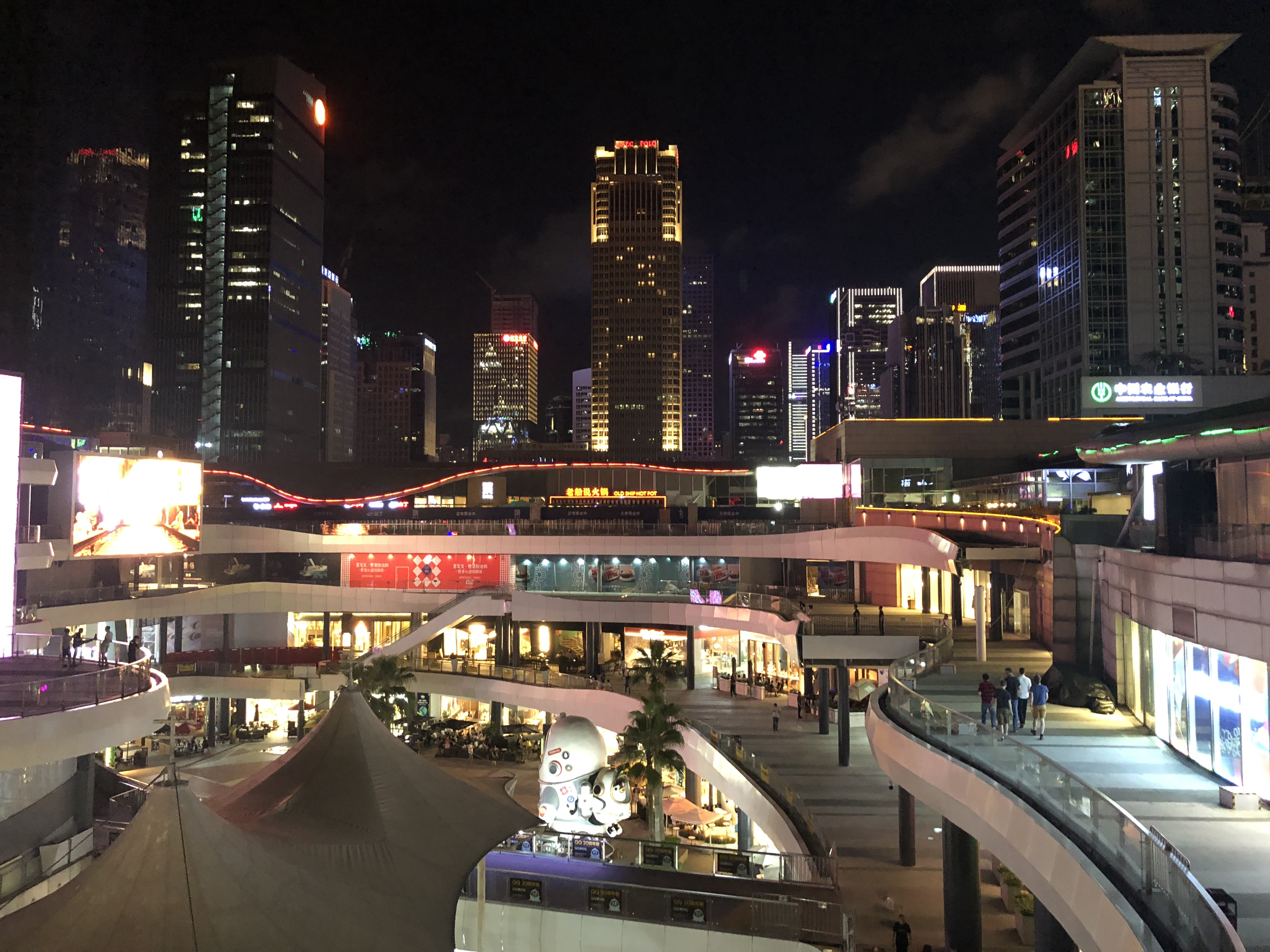
COCO Park at night

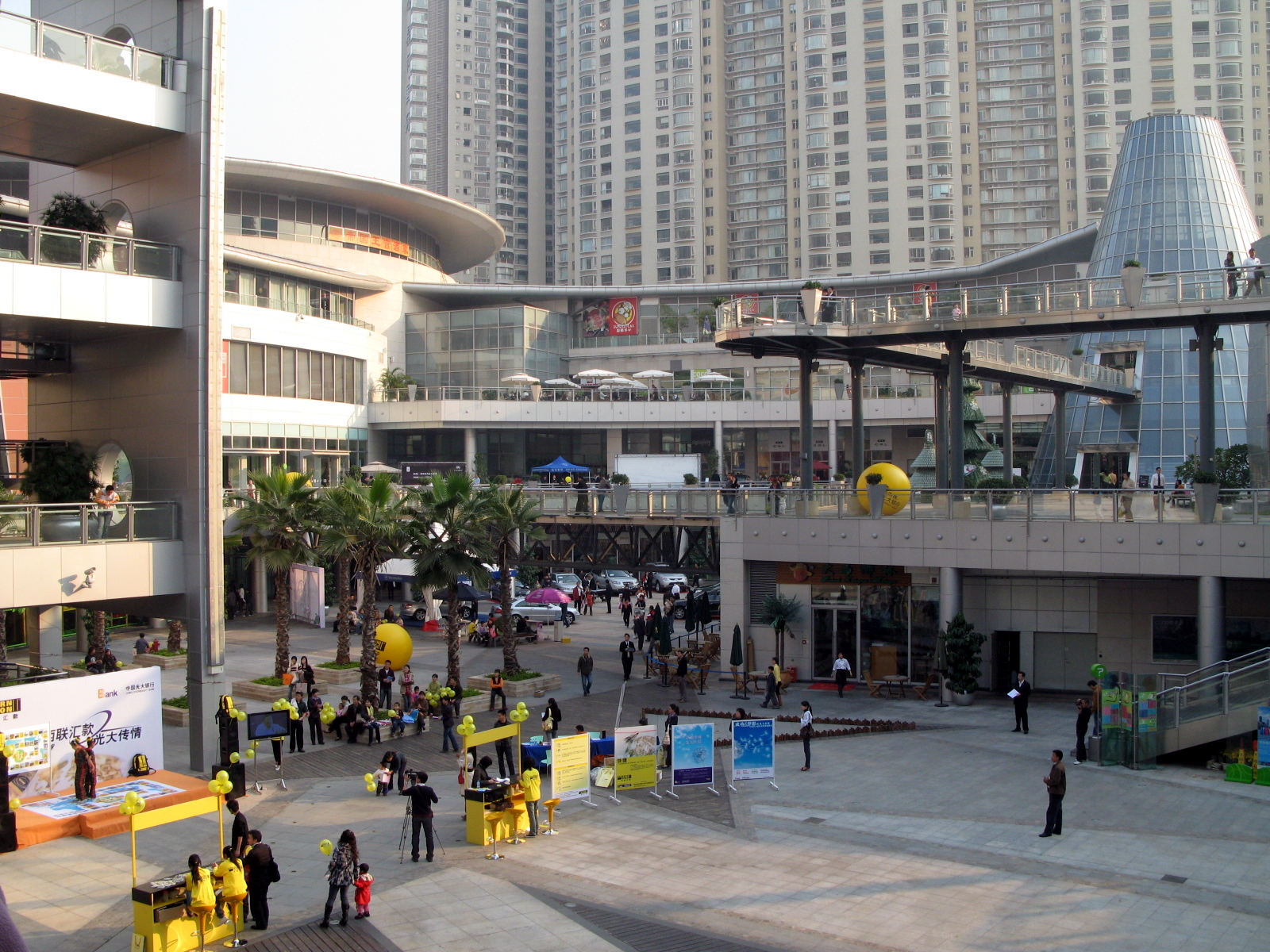
COCO Park inner courtyard

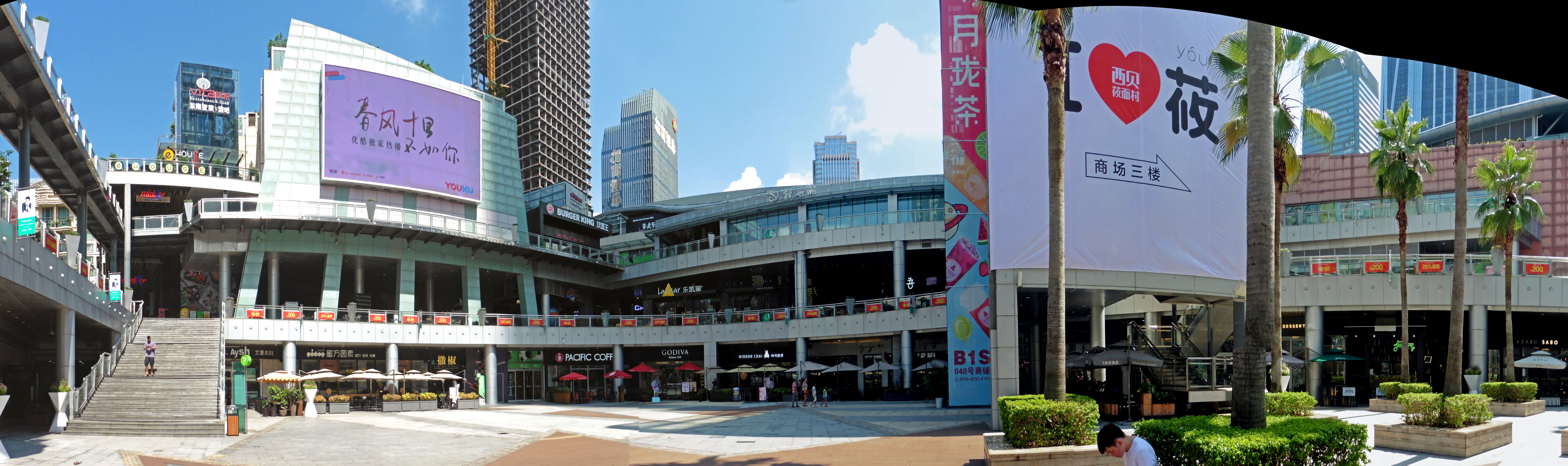
COCO Park panorama
