= Chiwei station =

Metro station in Shenzhen, China

Chiwei 赤尾
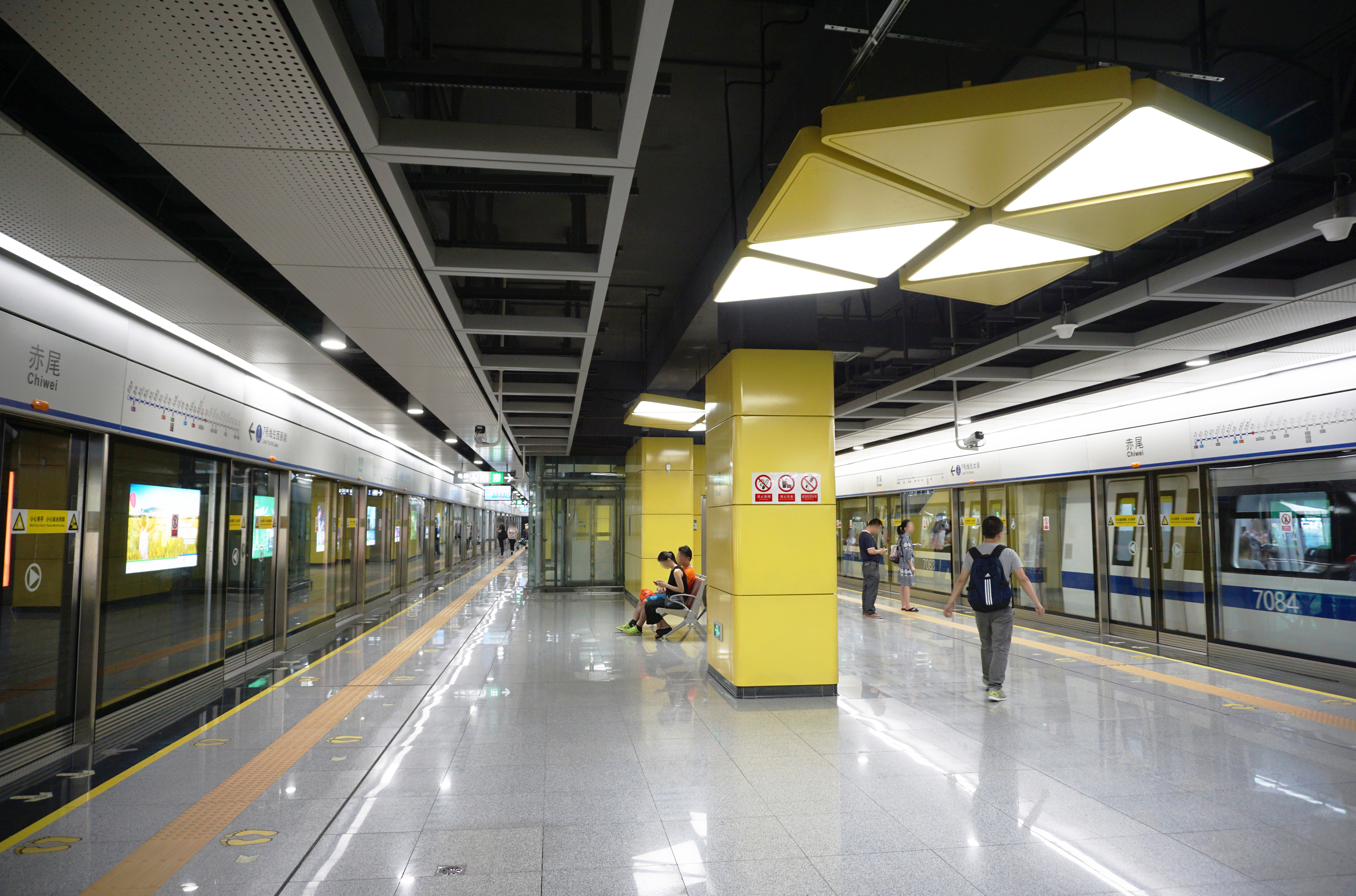
- Platform

General information
- Location: Futian District, Shenzhen, Guangdong; China
- Coordinates: 22°32′16″N 114°5′25″E
- Operated by: SZMC (Shenzhen Metro Group)
- Line: Line 7
- Platforms: 2 (1 island platform)
- Tracks: 2

Construction
- Structure type: Underground
- Accessible: Yes

History
- Opened: 28 October 2016 (9 years ago)

Services
Preceding station	Shenzhen Metro	Following station
Huanggang Checkpoint towards SZU Lihu Campus	Line 7	Huaqiang South towards Tai'an
Location

Chiwei station (Chinese: 赤尾站; pinyin: Chìwěi Zhàn) is a station on Line 7 of the Shenzhen Metro. It opened on 28 October 2016.

== Station layout ==
G	-	Exits A-E
B1F; Concourse	Lobby	Ticket Machines, Customer Service, Shops, Vending Machines
B2F; Platforms	Platform	7 towards SZU Lihu Campus (Huanggang Checkpoint)
B2F; Platforms	Island platform, doors will open on the left
B2F; Platforms	Platform	7 towards Tai'an (Huaqiang South)

== Exits ==
Exit	Destination
Exit A	Binhe Boulevard (E), Chiwei 2nd Street, Huigang Mingyuan, Yixing Yuan, Shenhua Industrial Building, Fubin Nancun, Shangbu Building of Shenzhen Water Group
Exit B	Binhe Boulevard (E), Chiwei 1st Street, Chiwei 3rd Street, Chiweicun
Exit C	Binhe Boulevard (E), Chiwei Community Workstation, Kingkey View City, Pengli Building
Exit D	Binhe Boulevard (W), Fuxiang Street
Exit E	Binhe Boulevard (W), Jingfu Building
