= Antuo Hill station =

Metro station in Shenzhen, Guangdong, China

Antuo Hill 安托山
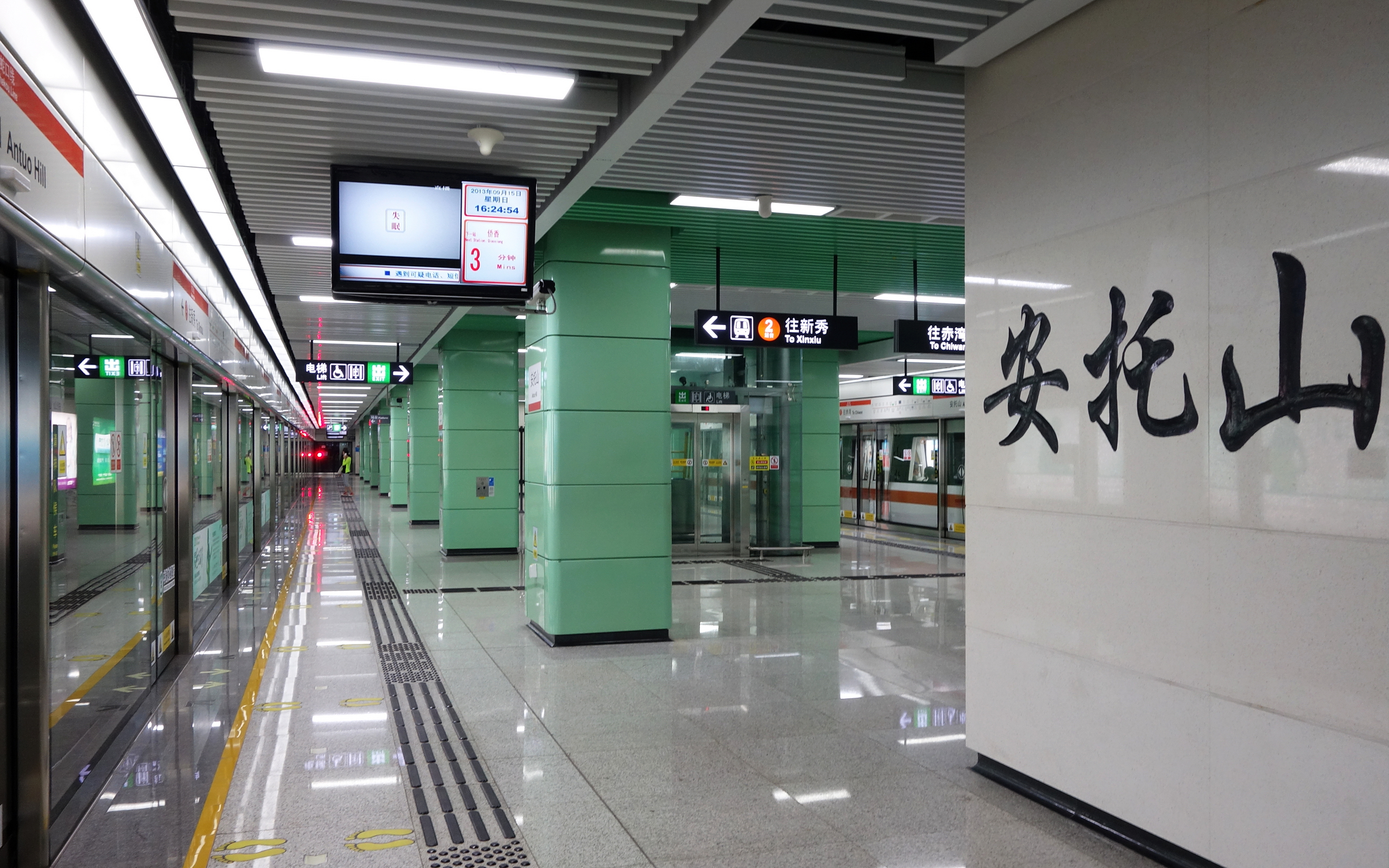
- Line 2 platform

Chinese name
- Chinese: 安托山
Transcriptions
Standard Mandarin
- Hanyu Pinyin: Āntuō Shān
Yue: Cantonese
- Jyutping: Ngon1tok3 Saan1

General information
- Location: Futian District, Shenzhen, Guangdong; China
- Coordinates: 22°32′55″N 114°0′22″E
- Operated by: SZMC (Shenzhen Metro Group)
- Lines: Line 2; Line 7
- Platforms: 4 (1 island platform and 2 side platforms)
- Tracks: 4

Construction
- Structure type: Underground
- Accessible: Yes

History
- Opened: Line 2: 28 June 2011 (15 years ago); Line 7: 28 October 2017 (8 years ago)

Services
Preceding station	Shenzhen Metro	Following station
Shenkang towards Chiwan	Line 2	Qiaoxiang towards Liantang (Line 8: Xichong)
Shenyun towards SZU Lihu Campus	Line 7	Nonglin towards Tai'an
Route map
Location

Antuo Hill station (Chinese: 安托山站; pinyin: Āntuō Shān Zhàn) is a station of Shenzhen Metro Line 2 and Line 7. Line 2 platforms opened on 28 June 2011 and Line 7 platforms opened on 28 October 2016.

== Station layout ==
G	-	Exits A-E
B1F; Concourse	Lobby	Customer service, shops, vending machines, ATMs, transfer passage between Line 2 and Line 7
B2F; 7 Platforms	Side platform, doors will open on the right
B2F; 7 Platforms	Platform	7 towards SZU Lihu Campus (Shenyun)
B2F; 7 Platforms	Platform	7 towards Tai'an (Nonglin)
B2F; 7 Platforms	Side platform, doors will open on the right
B3F; 2 8 Platforms	Platform	2 towards Chiwan (Shenkang)
B3F; 2 8 Platforms	Island platform, doors will open on the left
B3F; 2 8 Platforms	Platform	8 towards Xichong (Qiaoxiang)

== Exits ==
Exit	Destination
Exit A	Qiaoxiang 3rd Road, Antuo Hill 4th Road, Yafujü
Exit B	Shenzhen Antuoshan Concrete Co. Ltd.
Exit C	Qiaoxiang 4th Road, Antuo Hill 4th Road, Tingquanjü
Exit D	Qiaoxiang 4th Road
Exit E	Yafujü, Qiaoxiang 3rd Road, Antuoshan 6th Road
