= Nonglin station =

Metro station in Shenzhen, China

Nonglin 农林
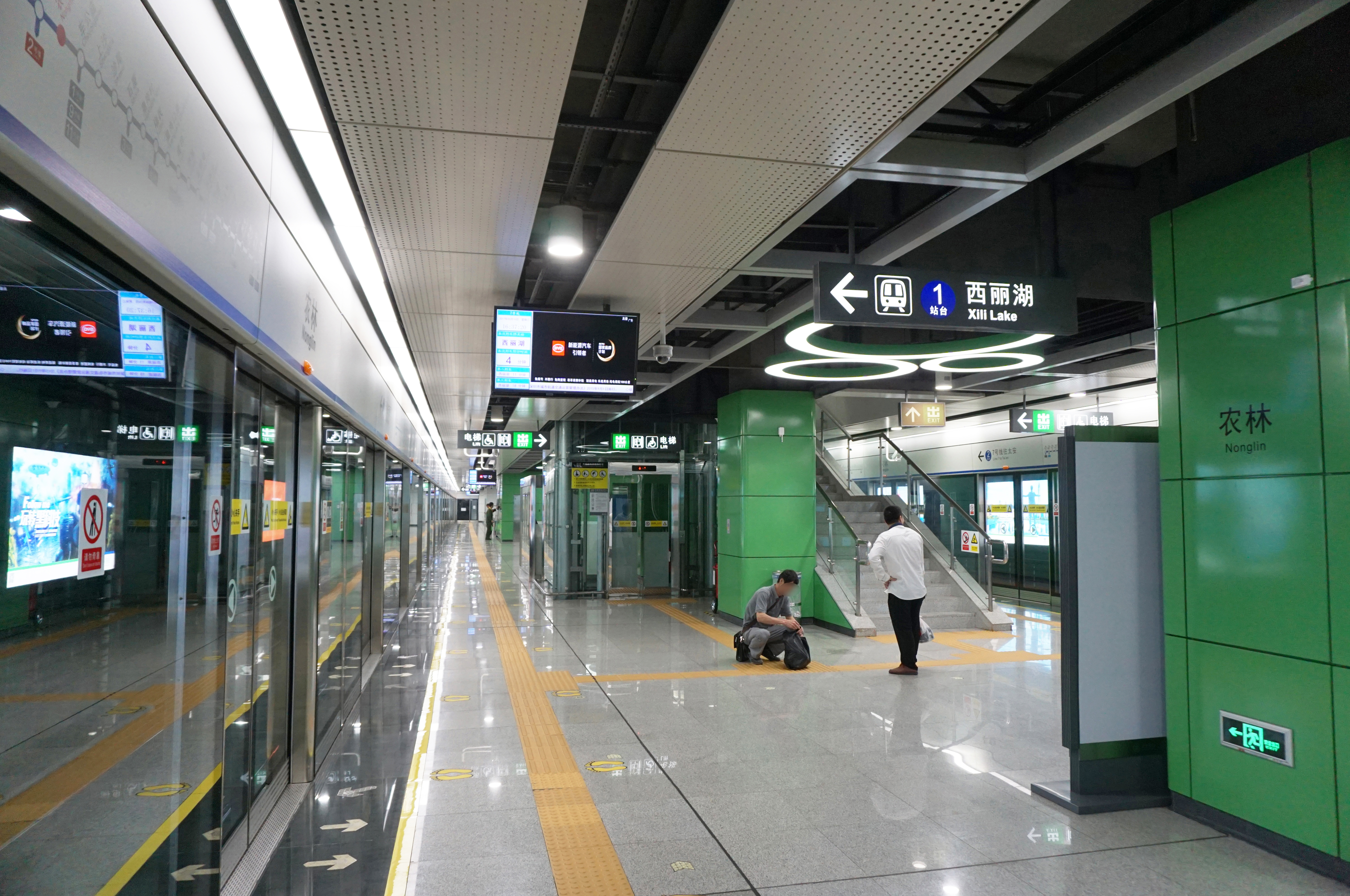
- Platform

General information
- Location: Futian District, Shenzhen, Guangdong; China
- Coordinates: 22°33′33″N 113°59′24″E
- Operated by: SZMC (Shenzhen Metro Group)
- Line: Line 7
- Platforms: 2 (1 island platform)
- Tracks: 2

Construction
- Structure type: Underground
- Accessible: Yes

History
- Opened: 28 October 2016 (9 years ago)

Services
Preceding station	Shenzhen Metro	Following station
Antuo Hill towards SZU Lihu Campus	Line 7	Chegongmiao towards Tai'an
Location

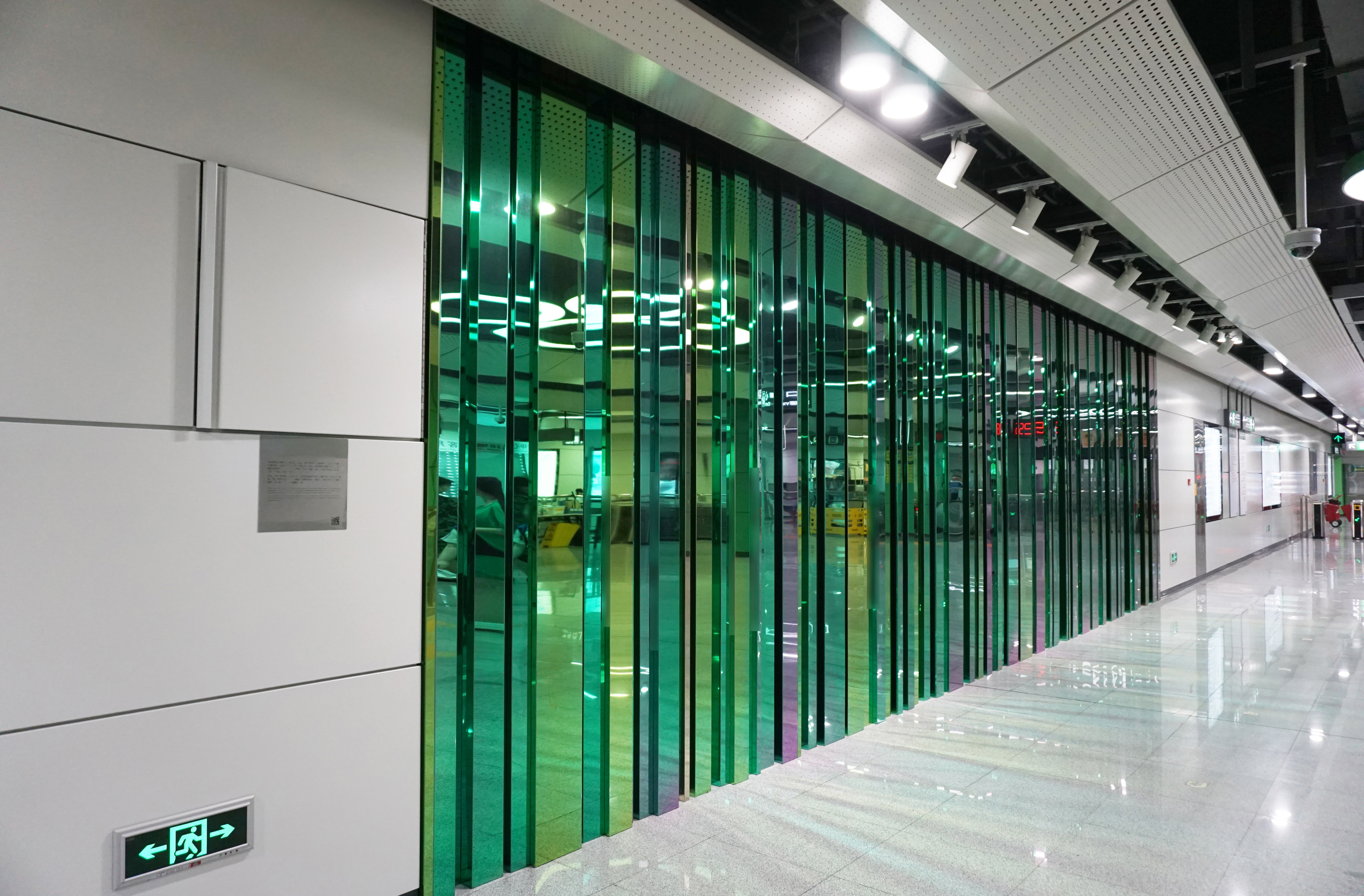
Art Wall - Green Forest

Nonglin station (Chinese: 农林站; pinyin: Nónglín Zhàn) is a station on Line 7 of the Shenzhen Metro. It opened on 28 October 2016.

== Station layout ==
G	-	Exits A-D
B1F; Concourse	Lobby	Ticket Machines, Customer Service, Shops, Vending Machines
B2F; Platforms	Platform	7 towards SZU Lihu Campus (Antuo Hill)
B2F; Platforms	Island platform, doors will open on the left
B2F; Platforms	Platform	7 towards Tai'an (Chegongmiao)

== Exits ==
Exit		Destination
Exit A		Shenzhen Senior High School (South Campus), Futian People's Hospital (Xiangmihu Branch), Nonglin Road (E), Hongli West Road (S), Shennan Middle School Community, Zhuyuan Community, Xinzhuyuan, Jianye Community, Zhuyuan Community, Xinzhuyuan, Jianye Community
Exit B		Agricultural Business Building, Nongxuan Road (W), Donghai Town Square, Hongli West Road (S)
Exit C		Nongxuan Road (W), Hongli West Road (N), Lilinyuan, Xiangli Garden, Longxi Garden
Exit D	D1	Licuige, Shenzhen Ophthalmologic Hospital of Ji’nan University, Nonglin Road (E)
Exit D	D2	Shenzhen Zhuyuan Primary School, Xiangshan Meishuyuan, Fenglin Zuo'an, Jiatai Xingyuan, Shenzhen Children's Park, Nonglin Road (W), Sam's Club of Shenzhen Futian, St. Anthony's Catholic Church
