= Honghu station =

Metro station in Shenzhen, China

Honghu 洪湖
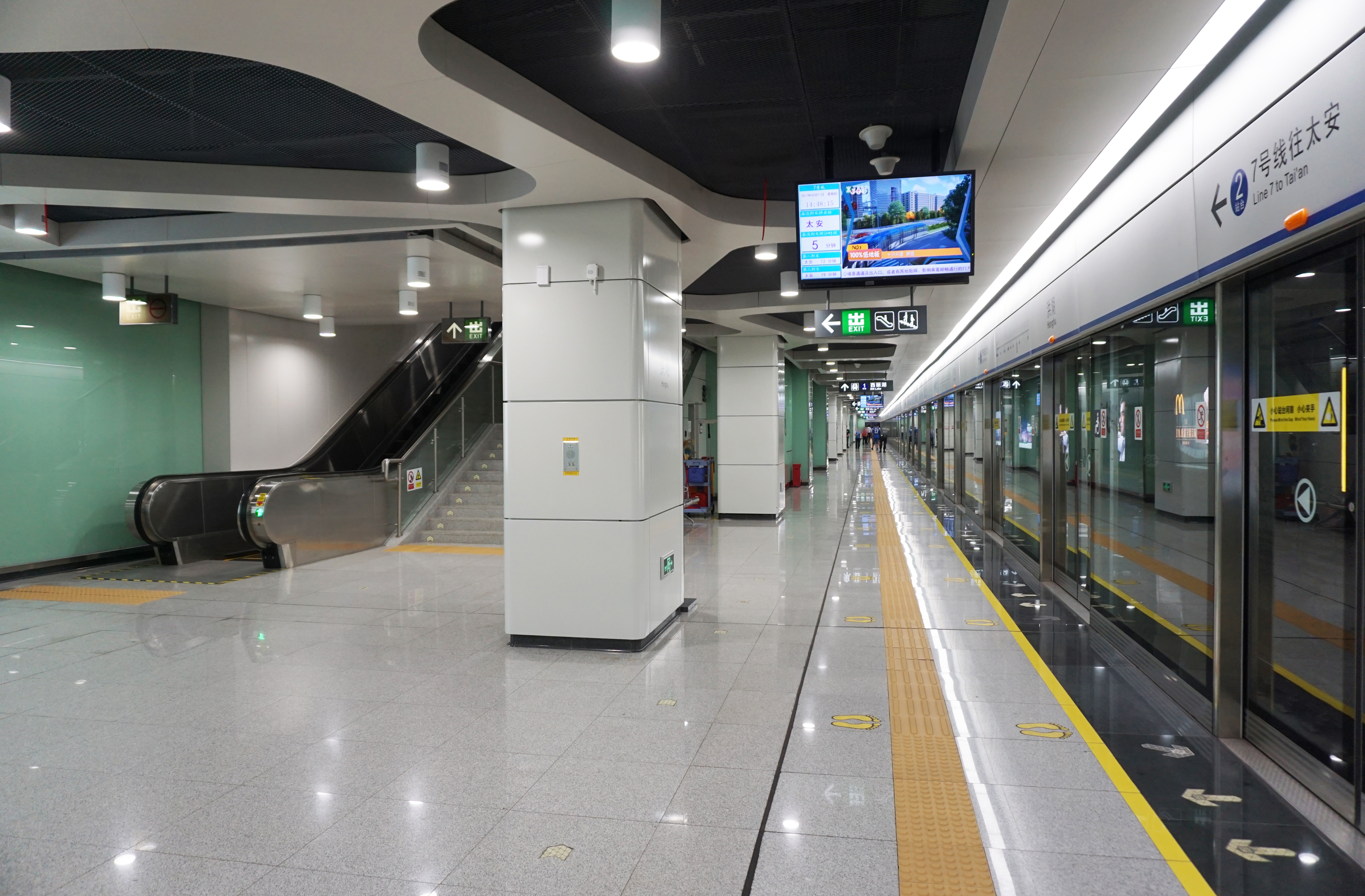
- Platform (towards Tai'an)

General information
- Location: Luohu District, Shenzhen, Guangdong; China
- Coordinates: 22°34′20″N 114°7′46″E
- Operated by: SZMC (Shenzhen Metro Group)
- Line: Line 7
- Platforms: 2 (2 split side platforms)
- Tracks: 2

Construction
- Structure type: Underground
- Accessible: Yes

History
- Opened: 28 October 2016 (9 years ago)

Services
Preceding station	Shenzhen Metro	Following station
Sungang towards SZU Lihu Campus	Line 7	Tianbei towards Tai'an
Location

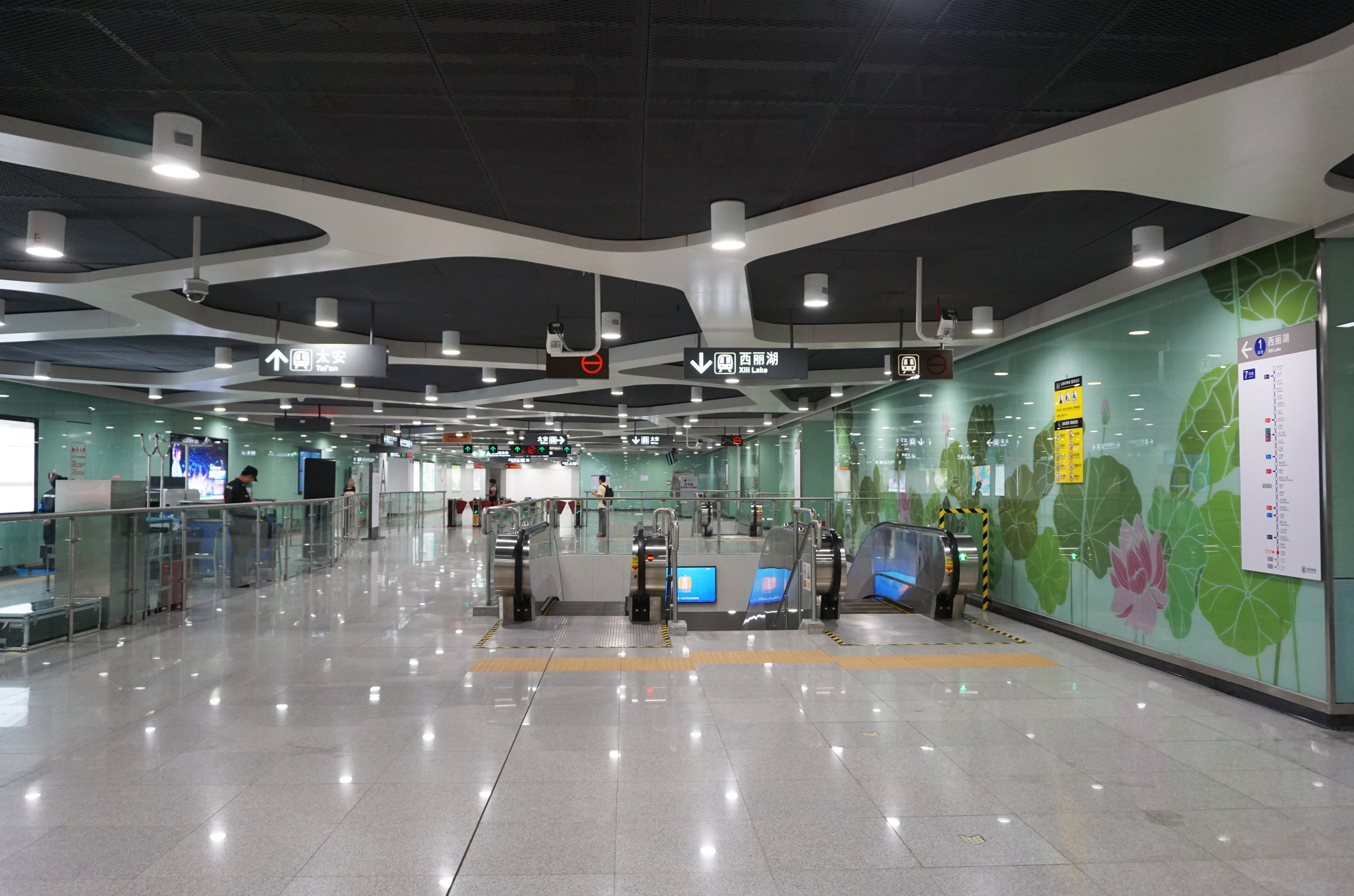
Concourse

Honghu station (Chinese: 洪湖站; pinyin: Hónghú Zhàn) is a station on Line 7 of the Shenzhen Metro in Guangdong, China. It opened on 28 October 2016.

== Station layout ==
G	-	Exits A-E
B1F; Concourse	Lobby	Ticket Machines, Customer Service, Shops, Vending Machines
B2F; Platforms	Side platform, doors will open on the right
B2F; Platforms	Platform	7 towards SZU Lihu Campus (Sungang)
B3F; Platforms	Side platform, doors will open on the left
B3F; Platforms	Platform	7 towards Tai'an (Tianbei)

== Exits ==
Exit		Destination
Exit A		Tianbeicun, Tianbei Garden, Meijing Building, Meijing Garden, Tianbei Building Materials Market, Lifeng Building Materials Market
Exit B		Honghu East Road
Exit C	C1	Wenjin North Road, Tianbeicun, Tianbei Garden, Tianbei Building Decoration City
Exit C	C2	Tianbei 4th Road, Wenjin North Road, Dehong Tianxia, Jinxing Building Materials Market, Ditian Hotel, Bao'an Foreign Trade Building, Tianyuan Residence Community
Exit D		Tianbei 4th Road, Shuitian 1st Street, East 1 Gate to Honghu Park, Cheung Kei Peng Building, Baolin Hotel, Yihu Ju, International Jewelry Plaza
Exit E		Reserved
