= Sungang station =

Metro station in Shenzhen, China

Sungang 笋岗
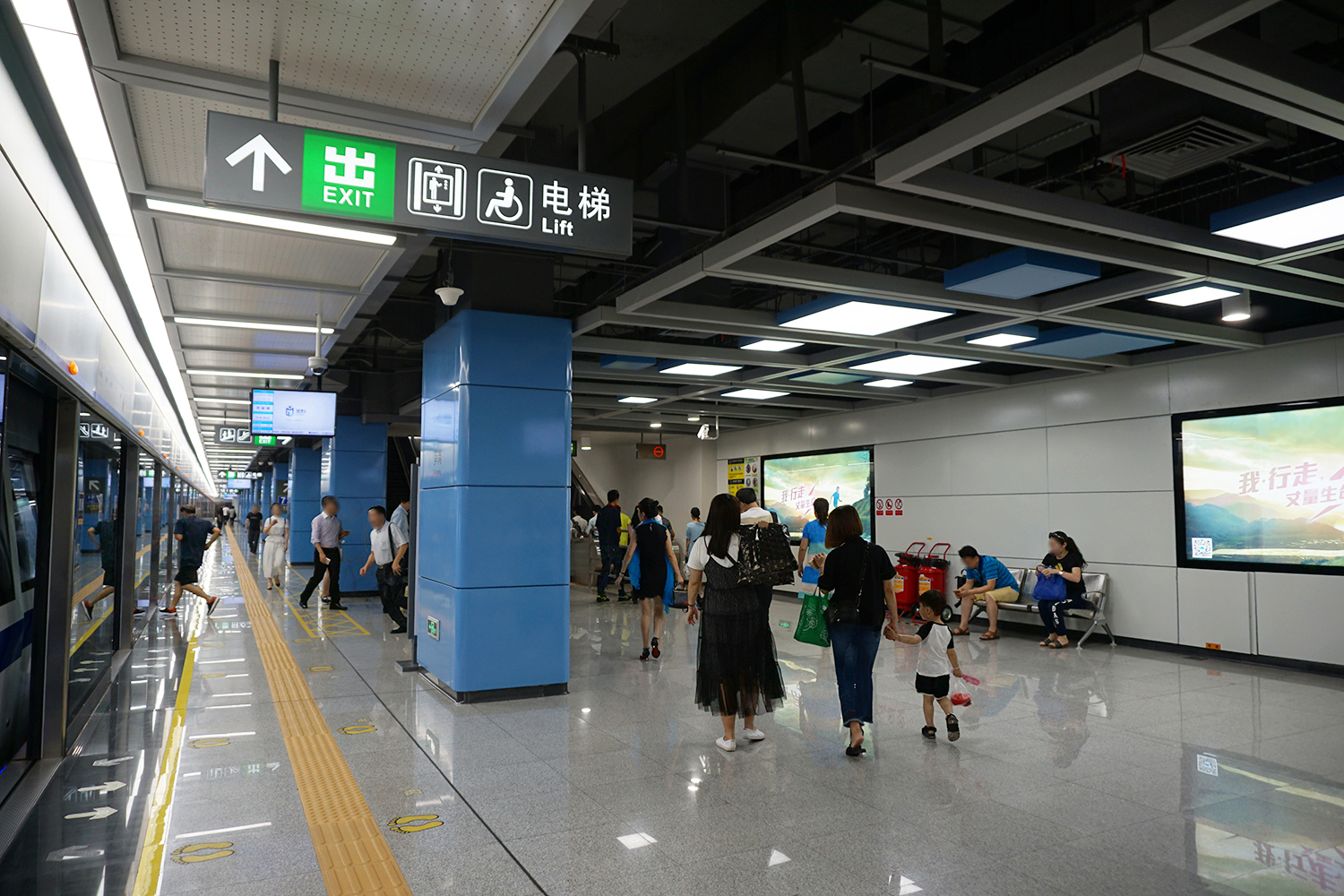
- Platform (towards SZU Lihu Campus)

General information
- Location: Luohu District, Shenzhen, Guangdong; China
- Coordinates: 22°34′11″N 114°7′4″E
- Operated by: SZMC (Shenzhen Metro Group)
- Line: Line 7
- Platforms: 2 (2 split side platforms)
- Tracks: 2

Construction
- Structure type: Underground
- Accessible: Yes

History
- Opened: 28 October 2016 (9 years ago)

Services
Preceding station	Shenzhen Metro	Following station
Hongling North towards SZU Lihu Campus	Line 7	Honghu towards Tai'an
Location

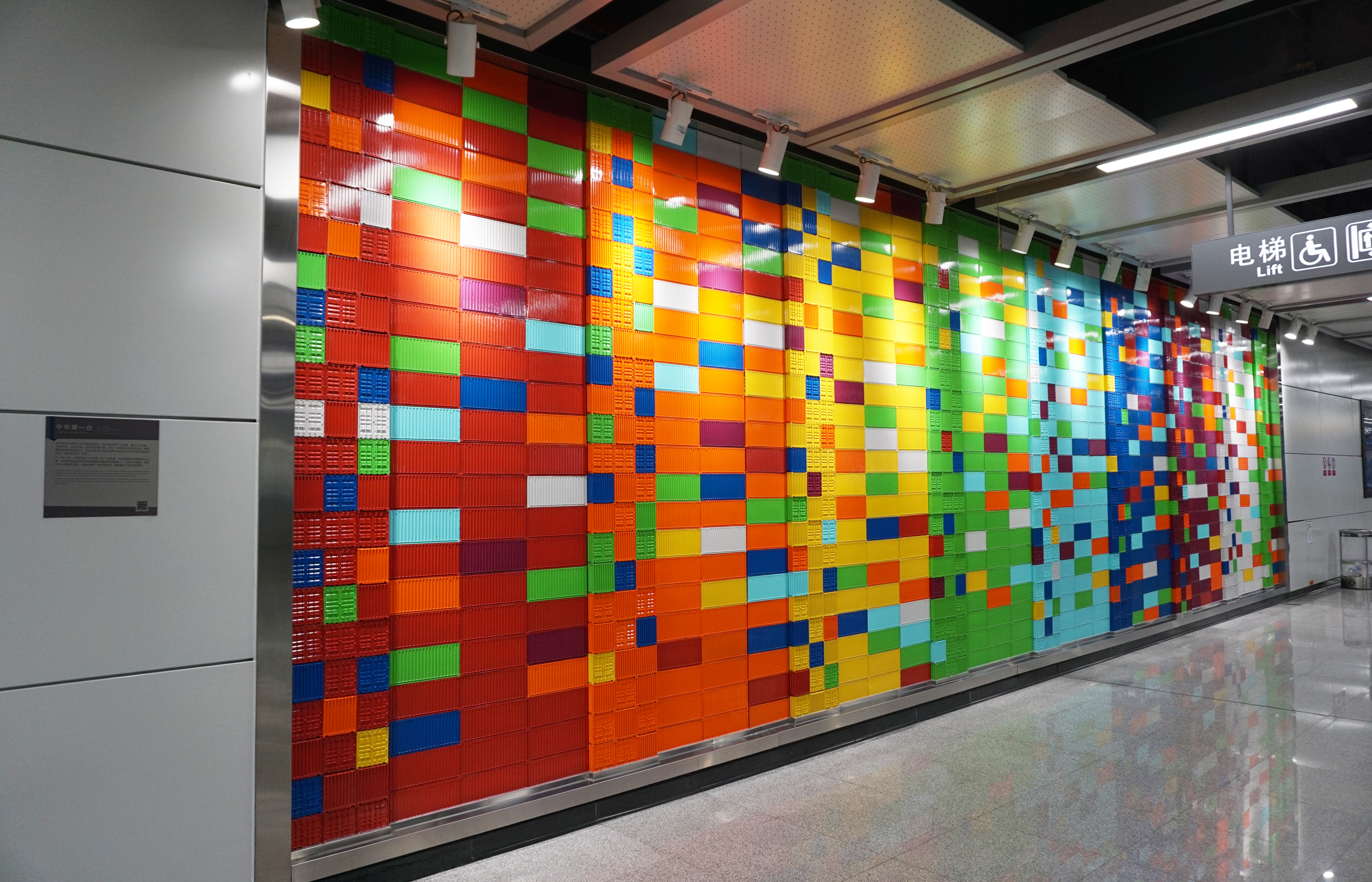
Art Wall - The No. 1 Storage of China

Sungang station (Chinese: 笋岗站; pinyin: Sǔngǎng Zhàn) is a station on Line 7 of the Shenzhen Metro. It opened on 28 October 2016.

== Station layout ==
G	-	Exits A-E
B1F; Concourse	Lobby	Ticket Machines, Customer Service, Shops, Vending Machines
B2F; Platforms	Side platform, doors will open on the right
B2F; Platforms	Platform	7 towards SZU Lihu Campus (Hongling North)
B3F; Platforms	Side platform, doors will open on the left
B3F; Platforms	Platform	7 towards Tai'an (Honghu)

== Exits ==
Exit		Destination
Exit A		SZLC Building, Sungang Warehouse, Huahaida International Garment Trade Center, Sungang Crafts City
Exit B		Reserved
Exit C	C1	Baogang Road, Jiandacheng 2nd-hand Automobile Trade Center, South China Clothing Art City, Hexin Home Decoration, Cars Also, Wujin Garden, Jinli Garden
Exit C	C2	Baogang Road, Rainbow Bridge, Tianxincun, Sungang Primary School, Sungangcun, Shenzhen Longhui Hotel, Luohu No.1 Middle School, Baogang Garden
Exit D		Meiyuan Road, Sungang Sub-district Office, Sungang Sub-district Work Councils, Durong Junk Market, Daihing Toyota
Exit E		Bao'an North Road, Meiyuan Road, Shenzhen General Talents Market, Hoba Furniture, Good-for Furniture, Luohu Daihing Benz
