= Xili Lake station =

Metro station in Shenzhen, Guangdong, China

Xili Lake 西丽湖
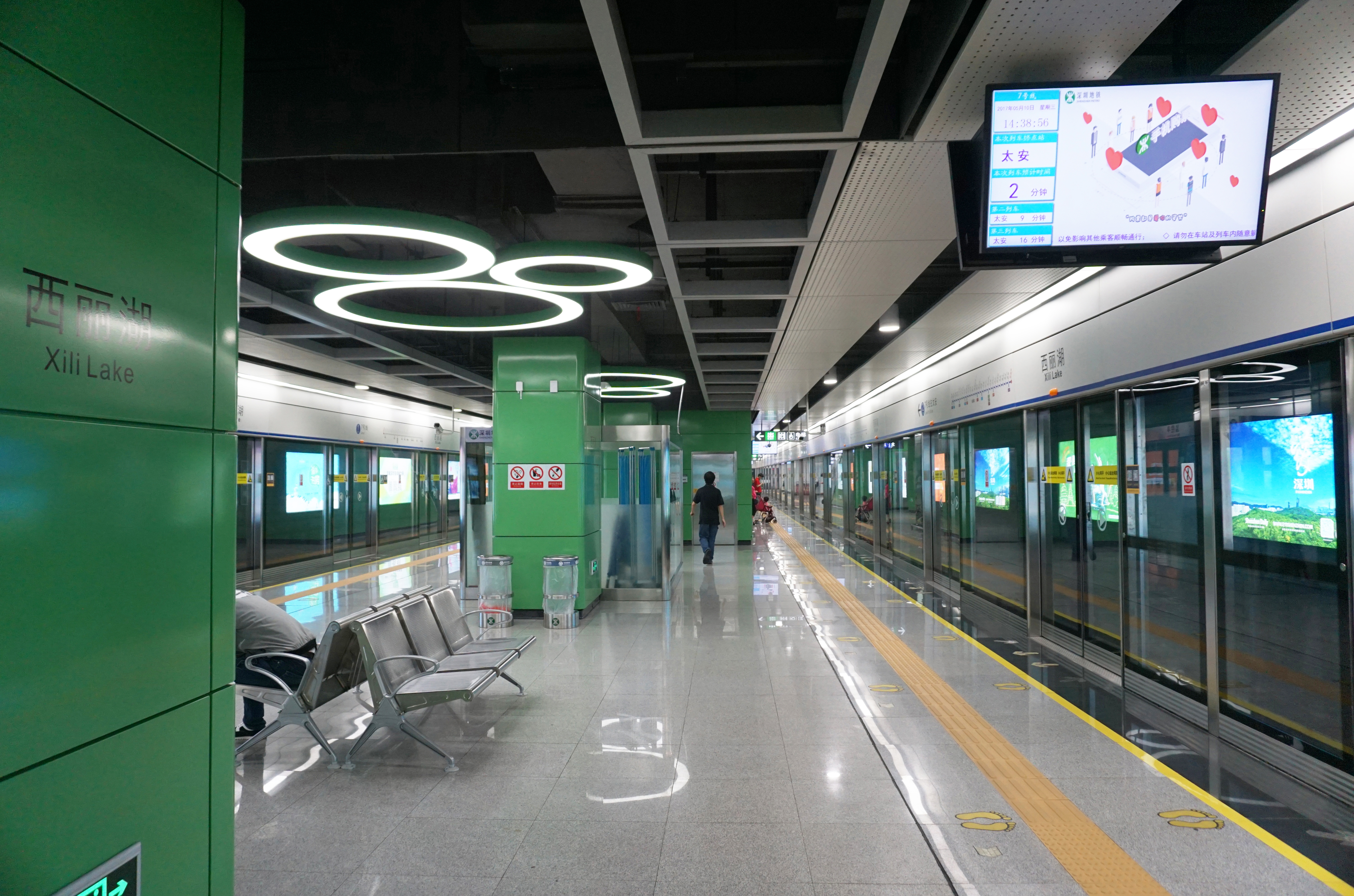
- Platform

General information
- Location: Nanshan District, Shenzhen, Guangdong; China
- Coordinates: 22°35′47″N 113°57′37″E
- Operated by: SZMC (Shenzhen Metro Group)
- Line: Line 7
- Platforms: 2 (1 island platform)
- Tracks: 2

Construction
- Structure type: Underground
- Accessible: Yes

History
- Opened: 28 October 2016 (9 years ago)

Services
Preceding station	Shenzhen Metro	Following station
Peking University towards SZU Lihu Campus	Line 7	Xili towards Tai'an
Location

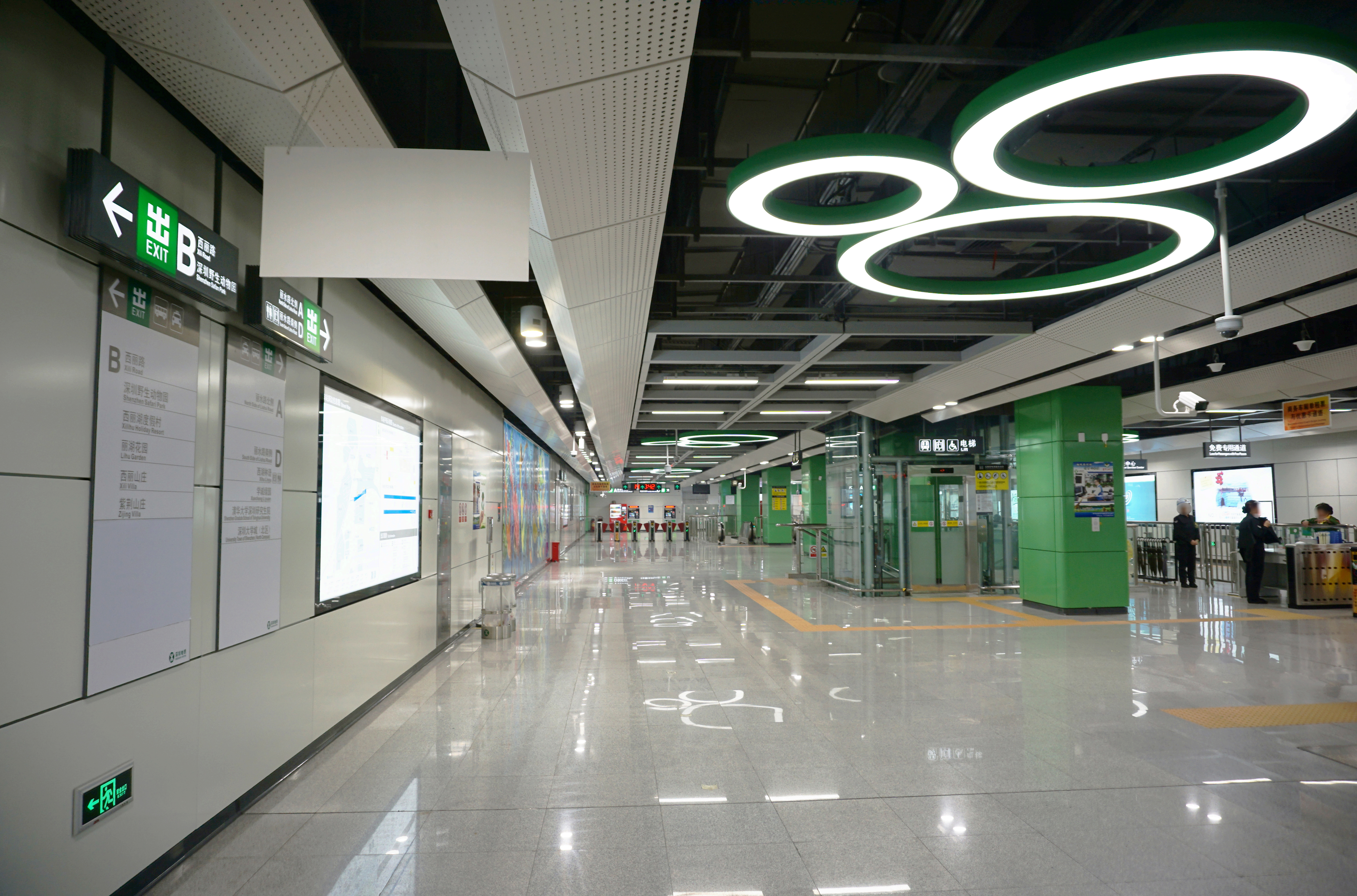
Concourse

Xili Lake station (Chinese: 西丽湖站; pinyin: Xīlì Hú Zhàn) is a station on Line 7 of the Shenzhen Metro. It opened on 28 October 2016.

== Station layout ==
G	-	Exits A-D
B1F; Concourse	Lobby	Ticket Machines, Customer Service, Shops, Vending Machines
B2F; Platforms	Platform	7 towards SZU Lihu Campus (Peking University)
B2F; Platforms	Island platform, doors will open on the left
B2F; Platforms	Platform 2	7 towards Tai'an (Xili)

== Exits ==
Exit	Destination
Exit A	Lishui Road (N)
Exit B	Xili Road, Shenzhen Safari Park, Xilihu Holiday Resort, Lihu Garden, Xili Villa, Zijing Villa, Pingli Garden, Deyi Mingju
Exit C	Lishan Road, Xihu Linyu, Xuecheng Lvyuan, Guigu Apartment, Sangtaidan Huayuan
Exit D	Lishui Road (S), Xihu Linyu, Xuecheng Lüyuan, Shenzhen Graduate School of Tsinghua University, University Town of Shenzhen (North Campus)
