= Huaqiang South station =

Metro station in Shenzhen, Guangdong, China

Huaqiang South 华强南
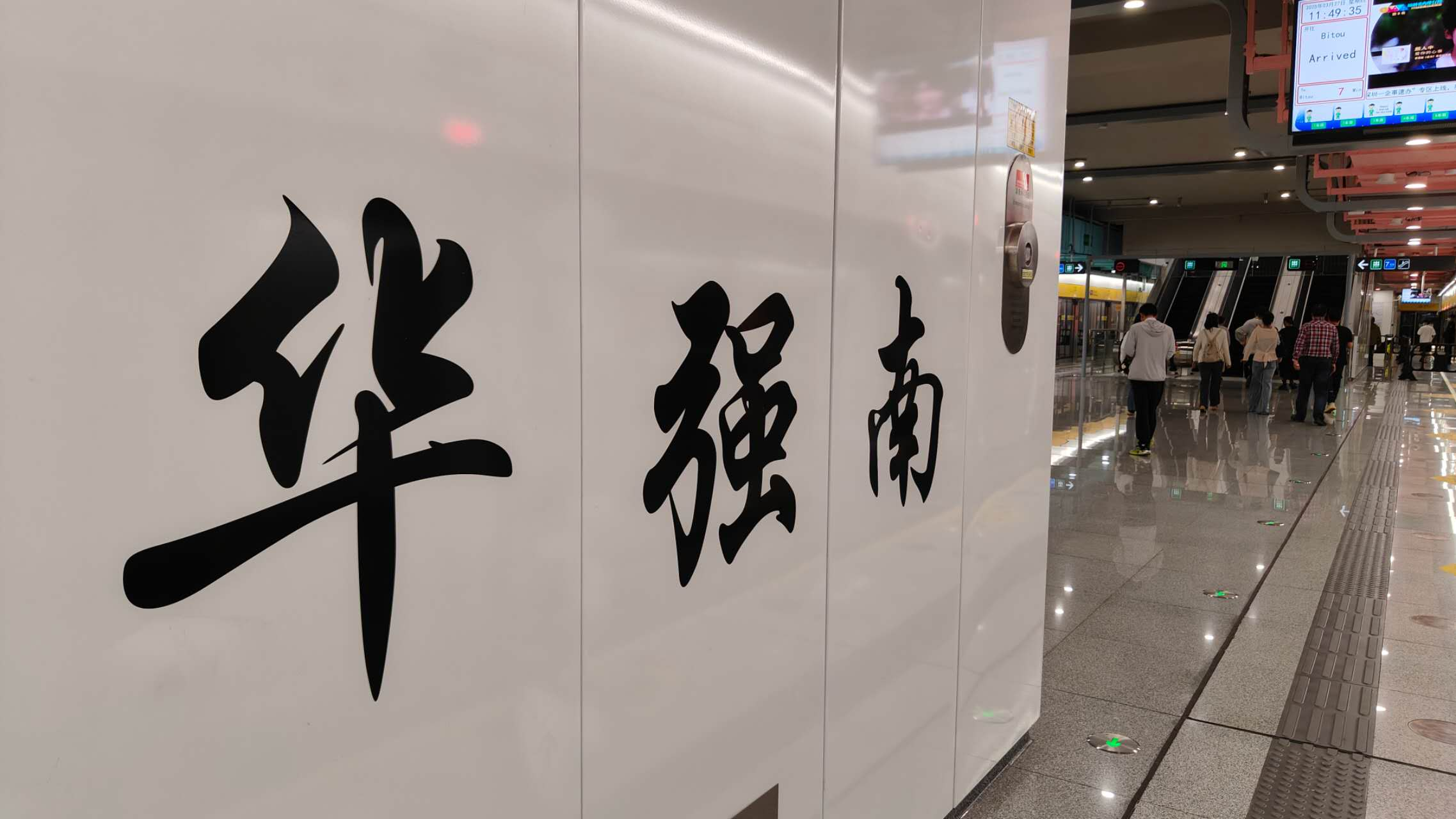
- Line 11 Calligraphy

General information
- Location: Futian District, Shenzhen, Guangdong; China
- Coordinates: 22°32′36″N 114°5′36″E
- Operator: SZMC (Shenzhen Metro Group)
- Lines: Line 7; Line 11
- Platforms: 4 (2 island platforms)
- Tracks: 4

Construction
- Structure type: Underground
- Accessible: Yes

History
- Opened: Line 7: 28 October 2016 (9 years ago); Line 11: 28 December 2024 (20 months ago)

Services
Preceding station	Shenzhen Metro	Following station
Chiwei towards SZU Lihu Campus	Line 7	Huaqiang North towards Tai'an
Fuxing towards Bitou	Line 11	Hongling South Terminus
Location

Huaqiang South station (Chinese: 华强南站; pinyin: Huáqiáng Nán Zhàn) is an interchange station between Line 7 and Line 11 of Shenzhen Metro. Line 7 platforms opened on 28 October 2016, whilst Line 11 platforms opened on 28 December 2024. It was the eastern terminus of Line 11 before Hongling South opened on 28 December 2025.

== Station layout ==
G	-	Exits A-F
B1F; Concourse	Lobby	Ticket Machines, Customer Service, Shops, Vending Machines
B2F; 7 Platforms	Platform	7 towards SZU Lihu Campus (Chiwei)
B2F; 7 Platforms	Island platform, doors will open on the left
B2F; 7 Platforms	Platform	7 towards Tai'an (Huaqiang North)
B3F; 11 Platforms	Platform	11 towards Bitou (Fuxing)
B3F; 11 Platforms	Island platform, doors will open on the left
B3F; 11 Platforms	Platform	11 towards Hongling South (terminus)

== Gallery ==
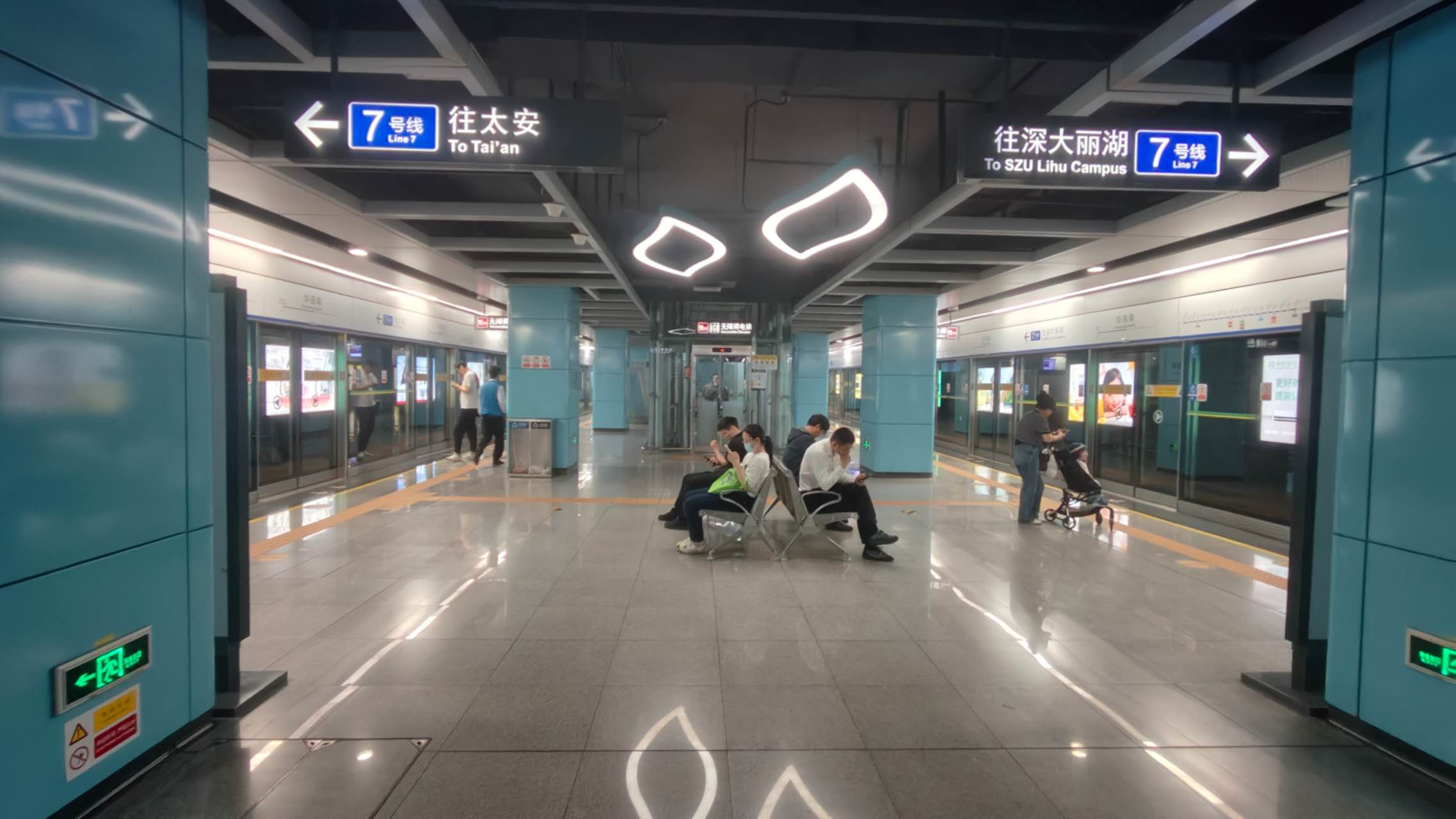
Line 7 Platforms

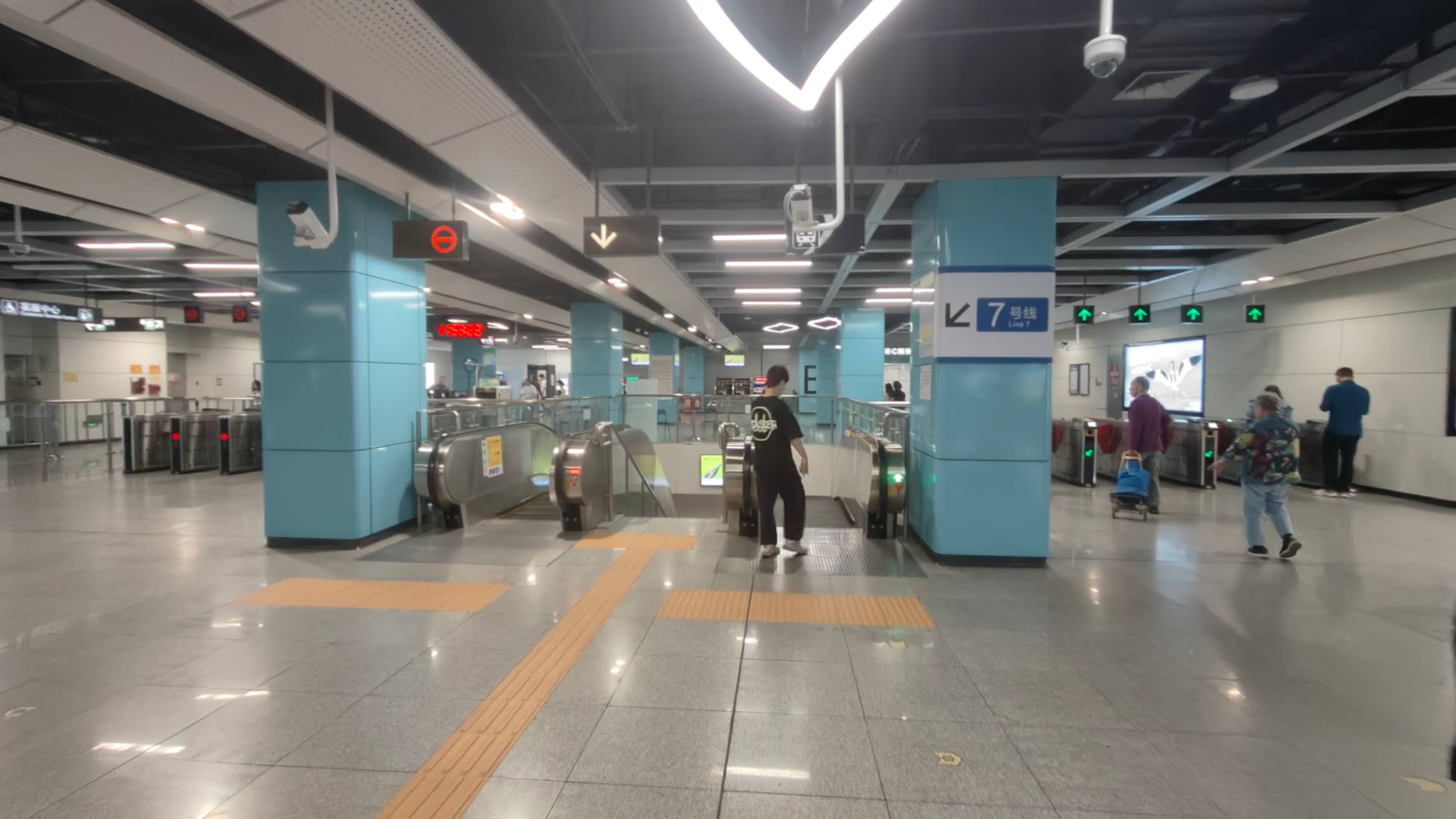
Line 7 Concourse

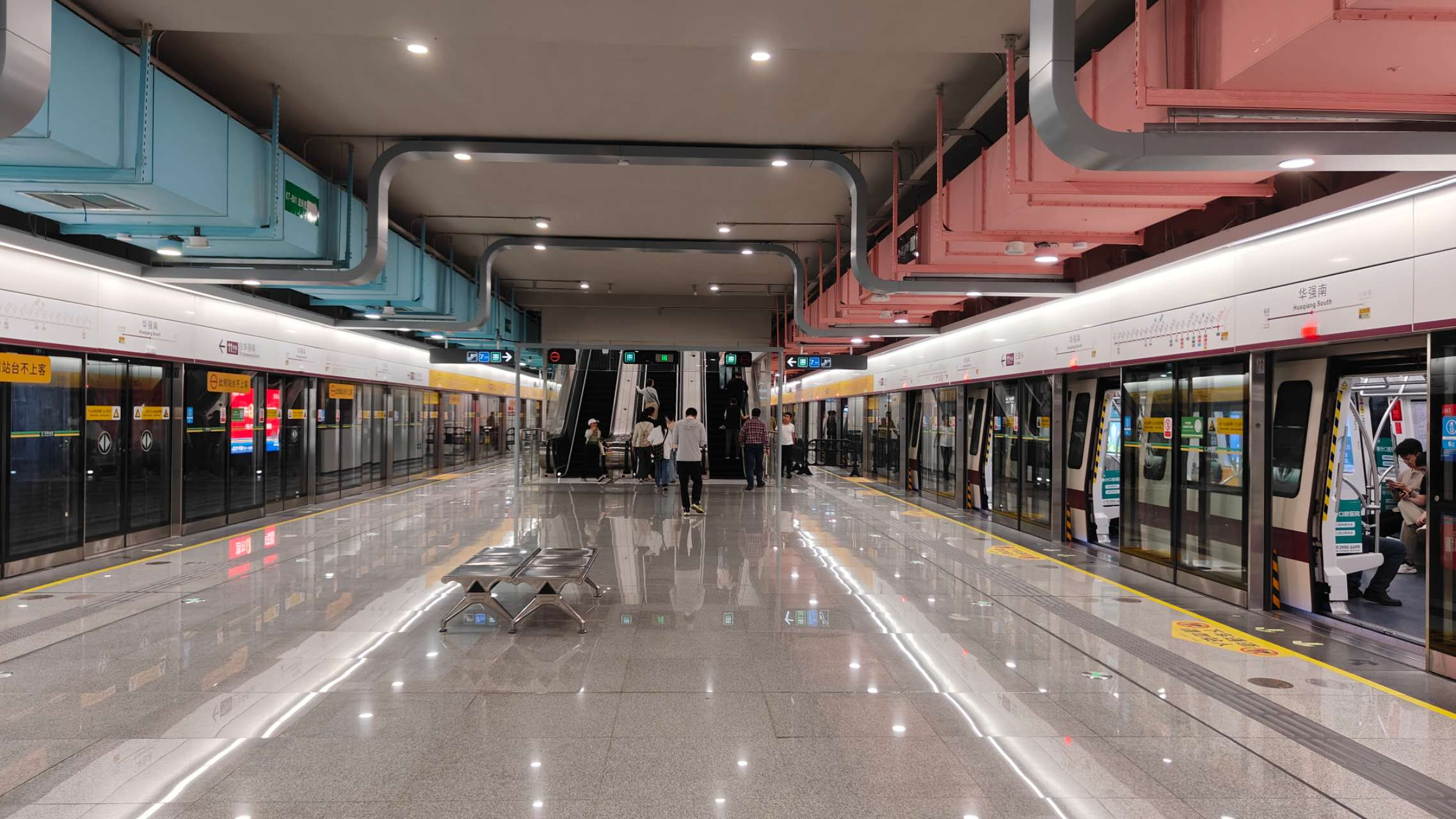
Line 11 Platforms

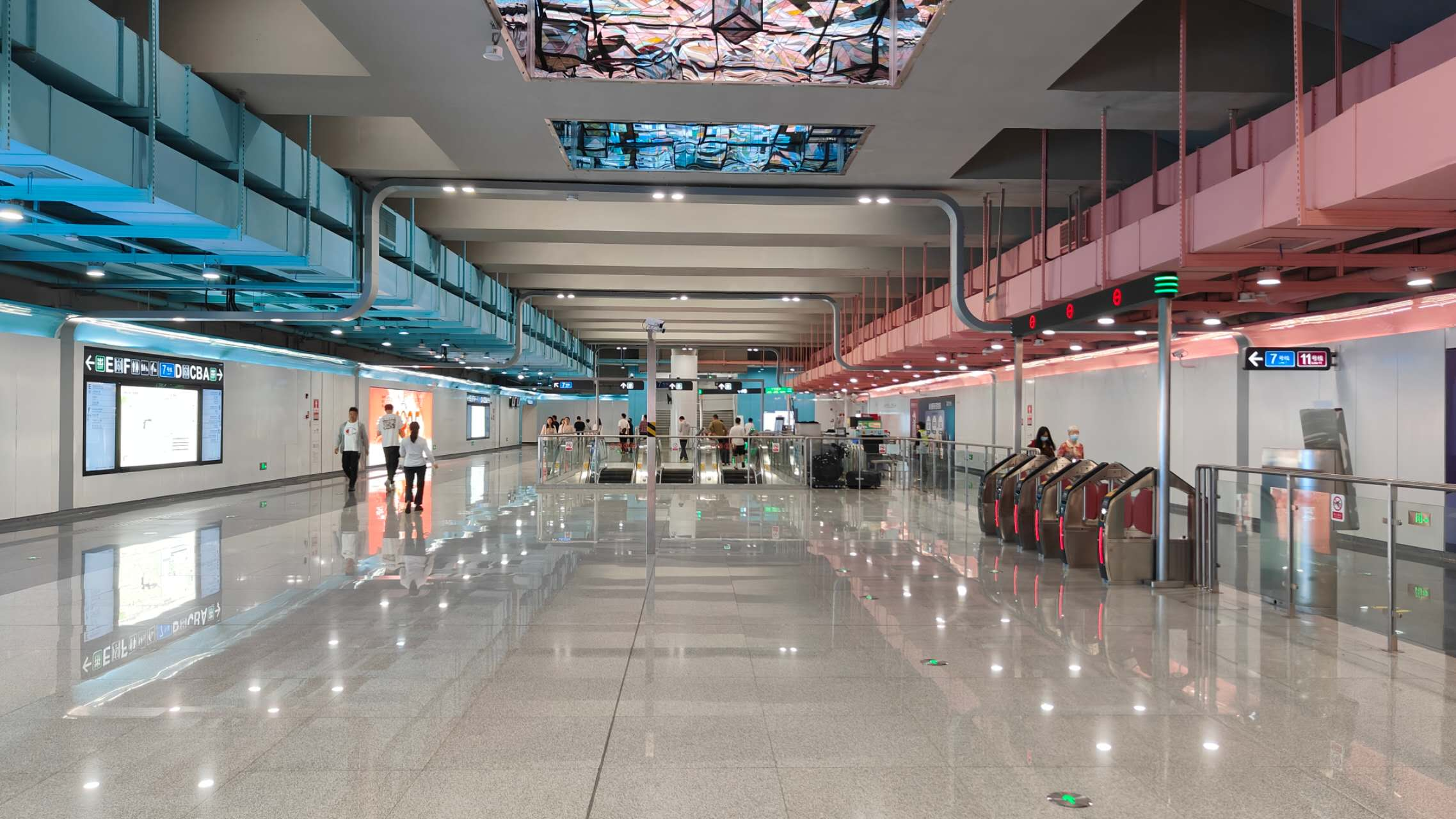
Line 11 Concourse

== Exits ==
Exit letter	Gallery	Destination
A		Huaqiang South Road (SE), Nanhua Garden, Nanyuan Commercial Corridor, Shangbu Middle School
B		Huaqiang South Road (NE), SEG Saige Yuan, Aihua Residence Community, Futian Sports Center
C		Huaqiang South Road (NW), Huaqiang Garden, Shenzhen Traditional Chinese Medical Hospital
D		Huaqiang South Road (SW), Shenzhen Traditional Chinese Medical Hospital, Radio Administration Building
E 1		Nanyuan Road (S)
E 2		Nanyuan Road (S), Old Market Estate
F		Nanyuan Road (N), CLP Compound
