= Peking University station =

Shenzhen Metro Line 7 station

Peking University 北大
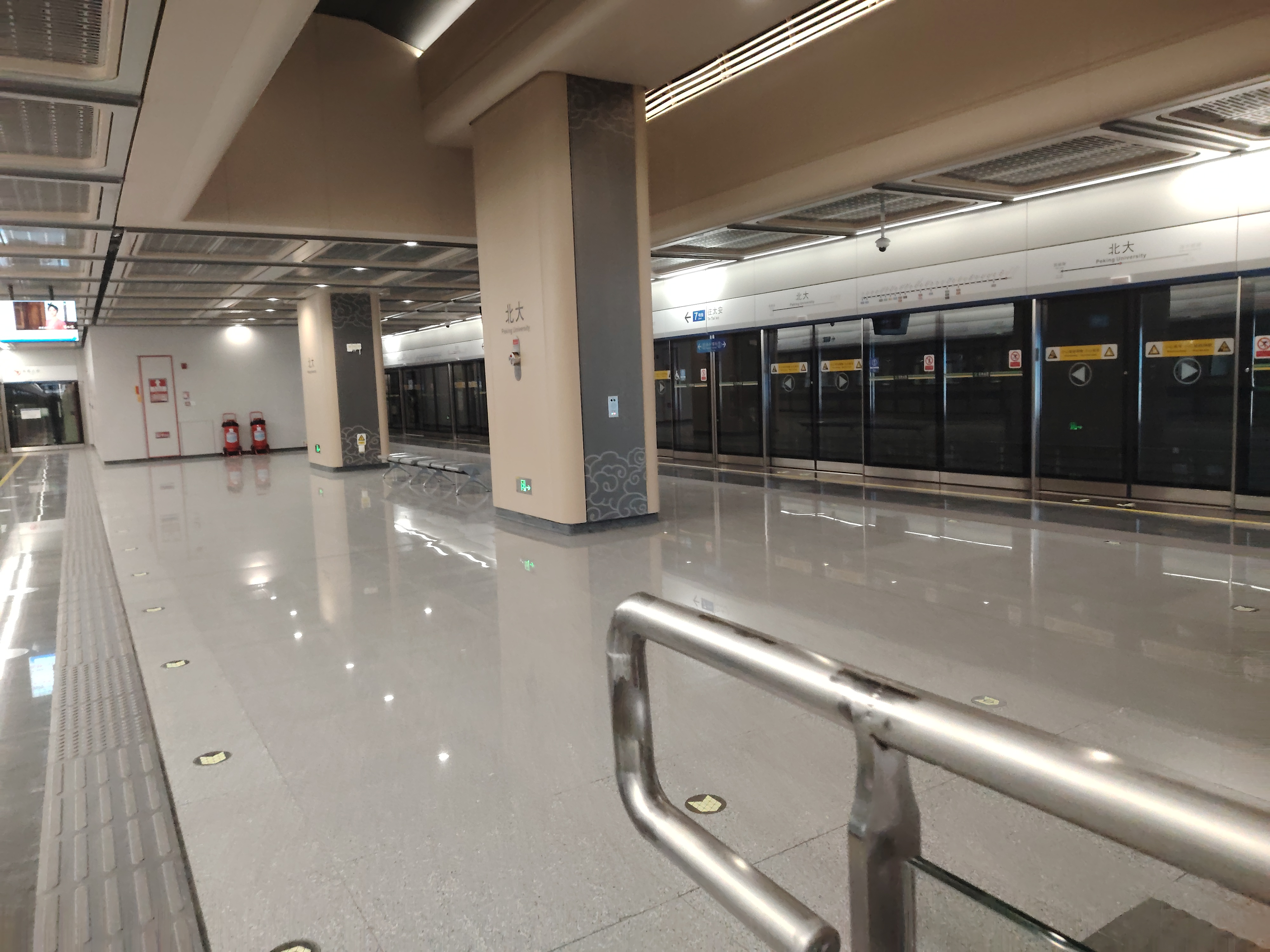
- Platform

Chinese name
- Chinese: 北大
Transcriptions
Standard Mandarin
- Hanyu Pinyin: Běidà
Yue: Cantonese
- Yale Romanization: Bāk Daai
- Jyutping: Bak1 Daai6

General information
- Location: Lishui Road (丽水路); Nanshan District, Shenzhen, Guangdong; China
- Coordinates: 22°35′48.926″N 113°58′24.712″E
- Operator: SZMC (Shenzhen Metro Group)
- Line: Line 7
- Platforms: 2 (1 island platform)
- Tracks: 2

Construction
- Structure type: Underground
- Accessible: Yes

History
- Opened: 28 December 2024 (19 months ago)

Services
Preceding station	Shenzhen Metro	Following station
SZU Lihu Campus Terminus	Line 7	Xili Lake towards Tai'an
Location

Peking University station (Chinese: 北大站; pinyin: Běidà Zhàn; Jyutping: Bak1 Daai6 Zaam6; Cantonese Yale: Bāk Daai Jaahm) is a station on Line 7 of Shenzhen Metro. It opened on 28 December 2024, and is located in Nanshan District, next to the Peking University Shenzhen Graduate School.

== Station layout ==
G	-	Exits A, C, D
B1F; Concourse	Lobby	Ticket Machines, Customer Service, Vending Machines
B2F; Platforms	Platform	7 towards SZU Lihu Campus (terminus)
B2F; Platforms	Island platform, doors will open on the left
B2F; Platforms	Platform	7 towards Tai'an (Xili Lake)

=== Entrances/exits ===
The station has 3 points of entry/exit.

- A: Shenzhen Radio and Television Group Xili Base, Xili Golf Club
- C: Peking University Shenzhen Graduate School
- D: Peking University Shenzhen Graduate School, Shenzhen University Town Sports Center
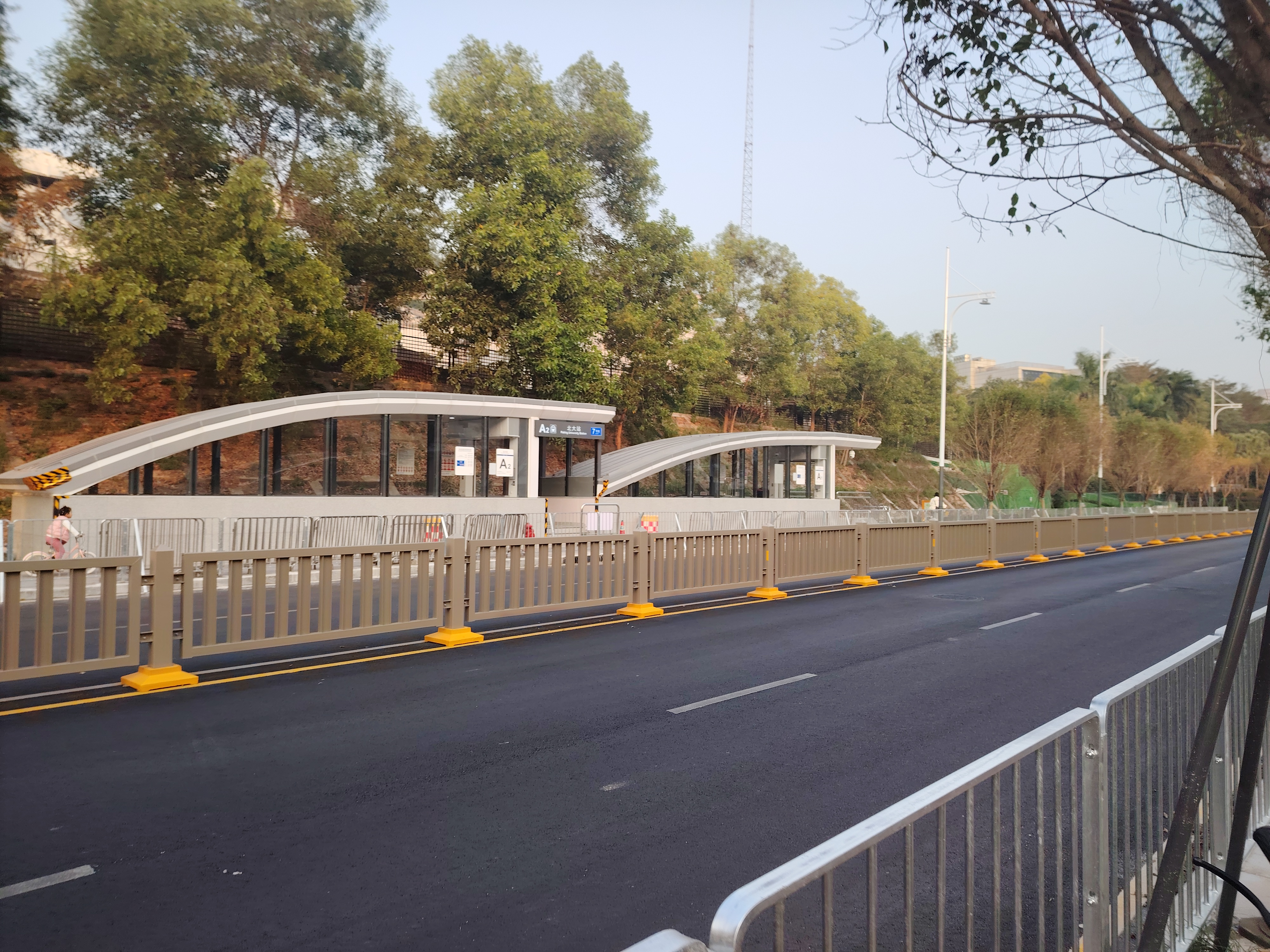
Entrance A

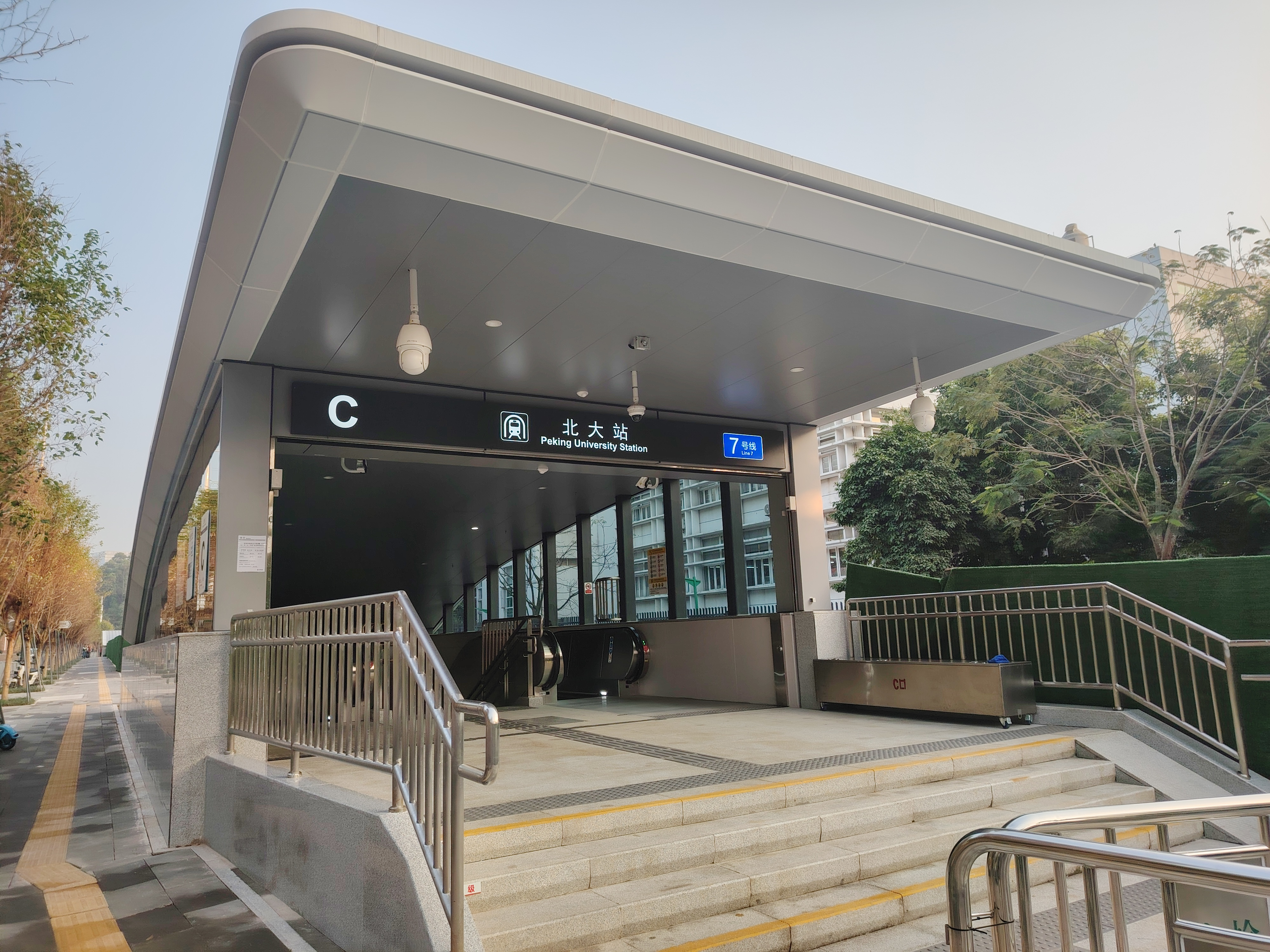
Entrance C

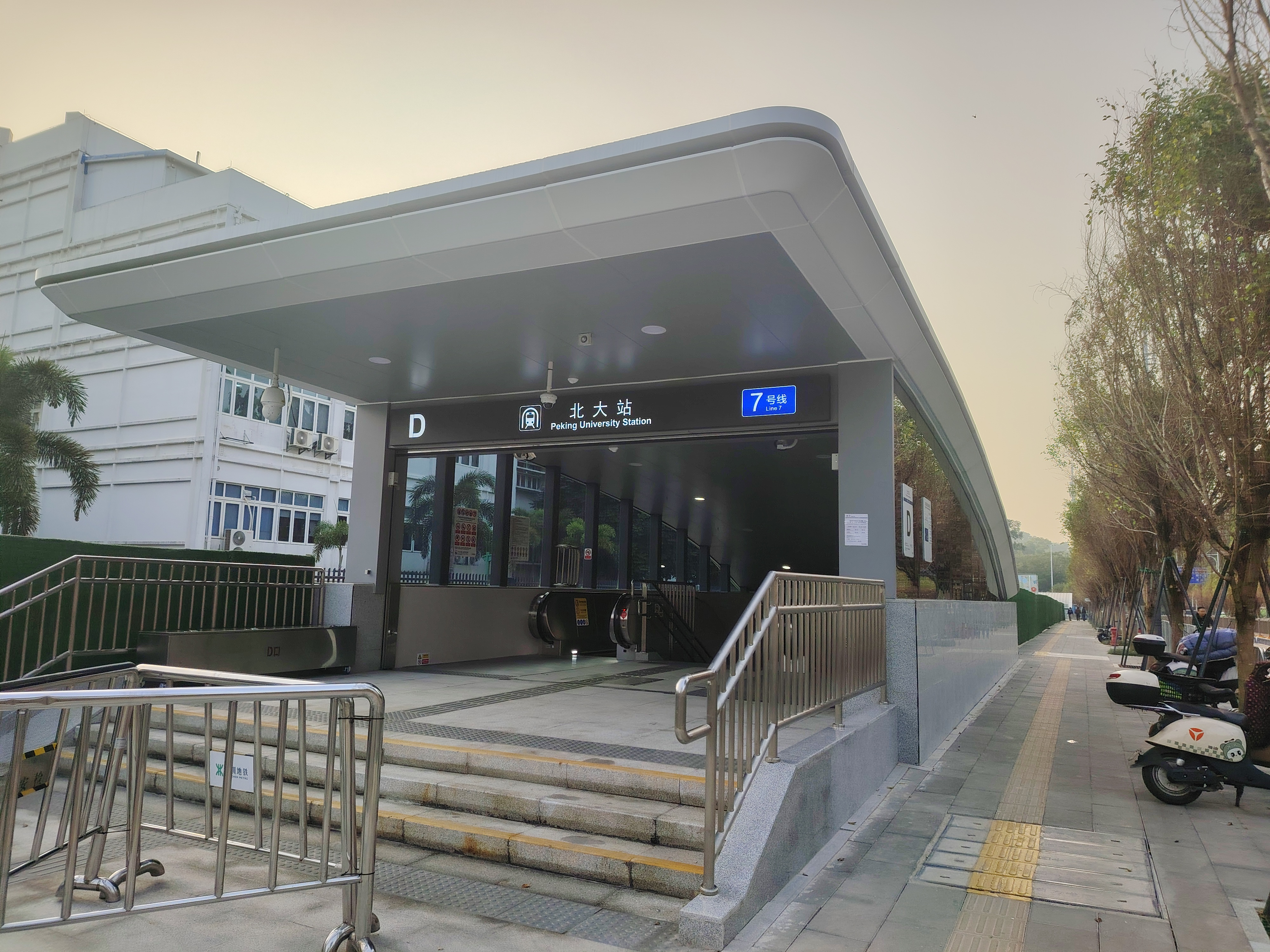
Entrance D
