= Tianbei station =

Metro station in Shenzhen, Guangdong, China

Tianbei 田贝
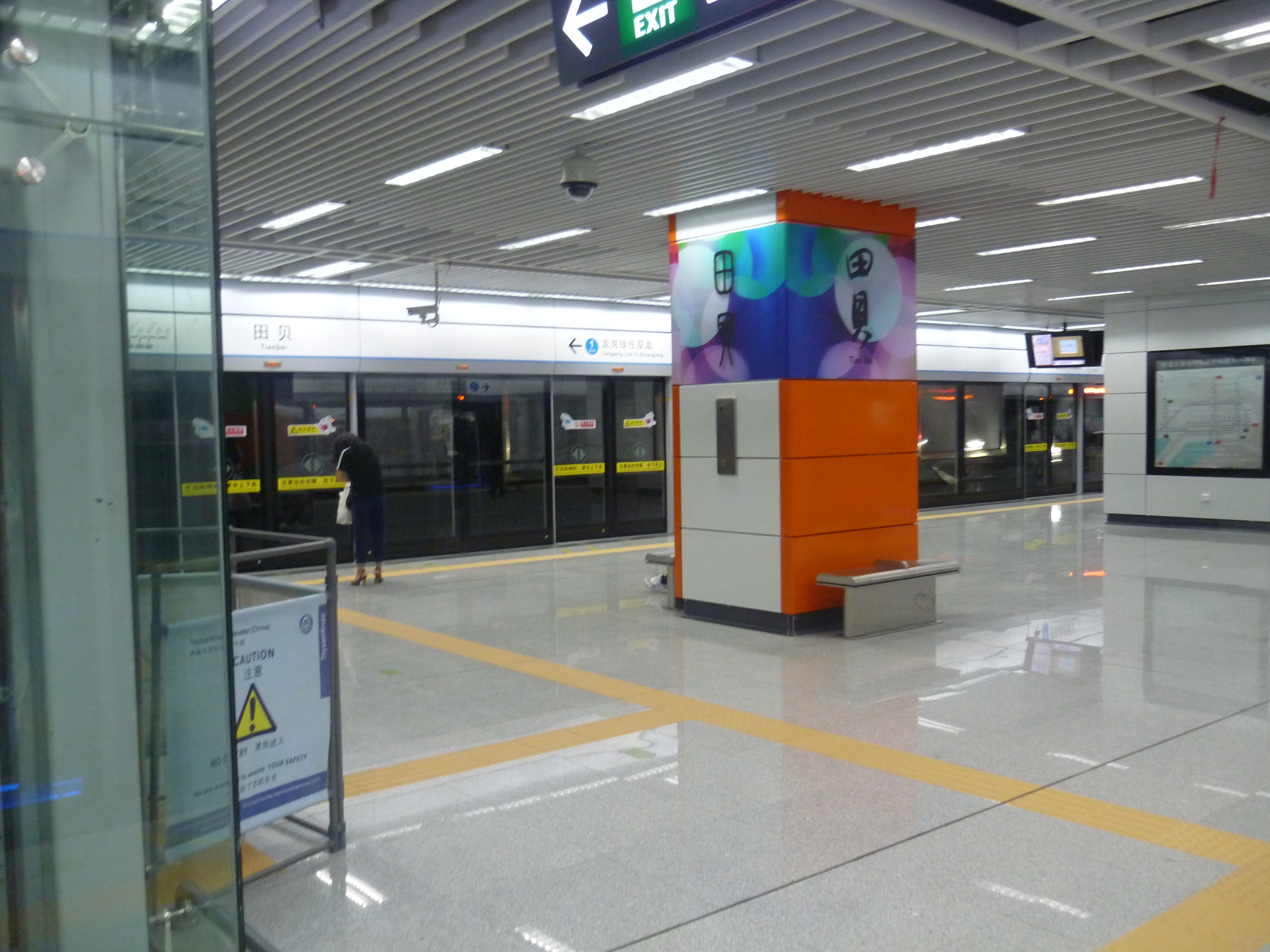
- Line 3 platform

General information
- Location: Luohu District, Shenzhen, Guangdong; China
- Coordinates: 22°34′3″N 114°7′49″E
- Operated by: SZMC (Shenzhen Metro Group)
- Lines: Line 3; Line 7
- Platforms: 4 (2 island platforms)
- Tracks: 4

Construction
- Structure type: Underground
- Accessible: Yes

History
- Opened: Line 3: 28 June 2011 (14 years ago); Line 7: 28 October 2016 (9 years ago)

Services
Preceding station	Shenzhen Metro	Following station
Shuibei towards Pingdi Liulian	Line 3	Cuizhu towards Futian Bonded Area
Honghu towards SZU Lihu Campus	Line 7	Tai'an Terminus
Location

Tianbei station (simplified Chinese: 田贝站; traditional Chinese: 田貝站; pinyin: Tiánbèi Zhàn; Jyutping: tin4 bui3 zaam6) is a station on Line 3 and Line 7 of the Shenzhen Metro. The Line 3 platforms opened on 28 June 2011 and the Line 7 platforms opened on 28 October 2016. It is located on Cuizhu Road.

== Station layout ==
G	-	Exits A, B, C, E, F and G
B1F; Concourse	Lobby	Ticket Machines, Customer Service, Shops, Vending Machines
B2F; 3 Platforms	Platform	3 towards Futian Bonded Area (Cuizhu)
B2F; 3 Platforms	Island platform, doors will open on the left
B2F; 3 Platforms	Platform	3 towards Pingdi Liulian (Shuibei)
B3F; 7 Platforms	Platform	7 towards SZU Lihu Campus (Honghu)
B3F; 7 Platforms	Island platform, doors will open on the left
B3F; 7 Platforms	Platform	7 towards Tai'an (terminus)

== Exits ==
Exit	Destination
Exit A	Cuizhu Road (S), Taining Road, Tai'an Road, Cuizhu Park, Kangning Hospital, Cuizhu Street Market
Exit B	Cuizhu Road (N), Baishida Garden, Walmart, Taining Road, Tai'an Road
Exit C	Cuizhu Road (N), Shuibei 1st Road, Tianbei 4th Road, Tianbei Jiaheju Decoration Materials Market, Wenjin North Road, Beili Garden, Yangguang Tiandi Homestead, Jinli International Jewelry Trade Centre (Phase I)
Exit E	Tianbei 4th Road, Shenzhen Cuibei Experimental School, Beili South Road
Exit F	Beili Garden, Yangguang Tiandi Homestead, Beili North Road, Tianbei 4th Road, Shenzhen Shuitian Primary School, Shuitian 2nd Street, Shuibei Wanshan
Exit G	Cuizhu Road (W), Shuibei 1st Road, Tianbei 4th Road
