= Shenkang station =

Metro station in Shenzhen, Guangdong, China

Coordinates: 22°32′39″N 114°0′0″E

Shenkang 深康
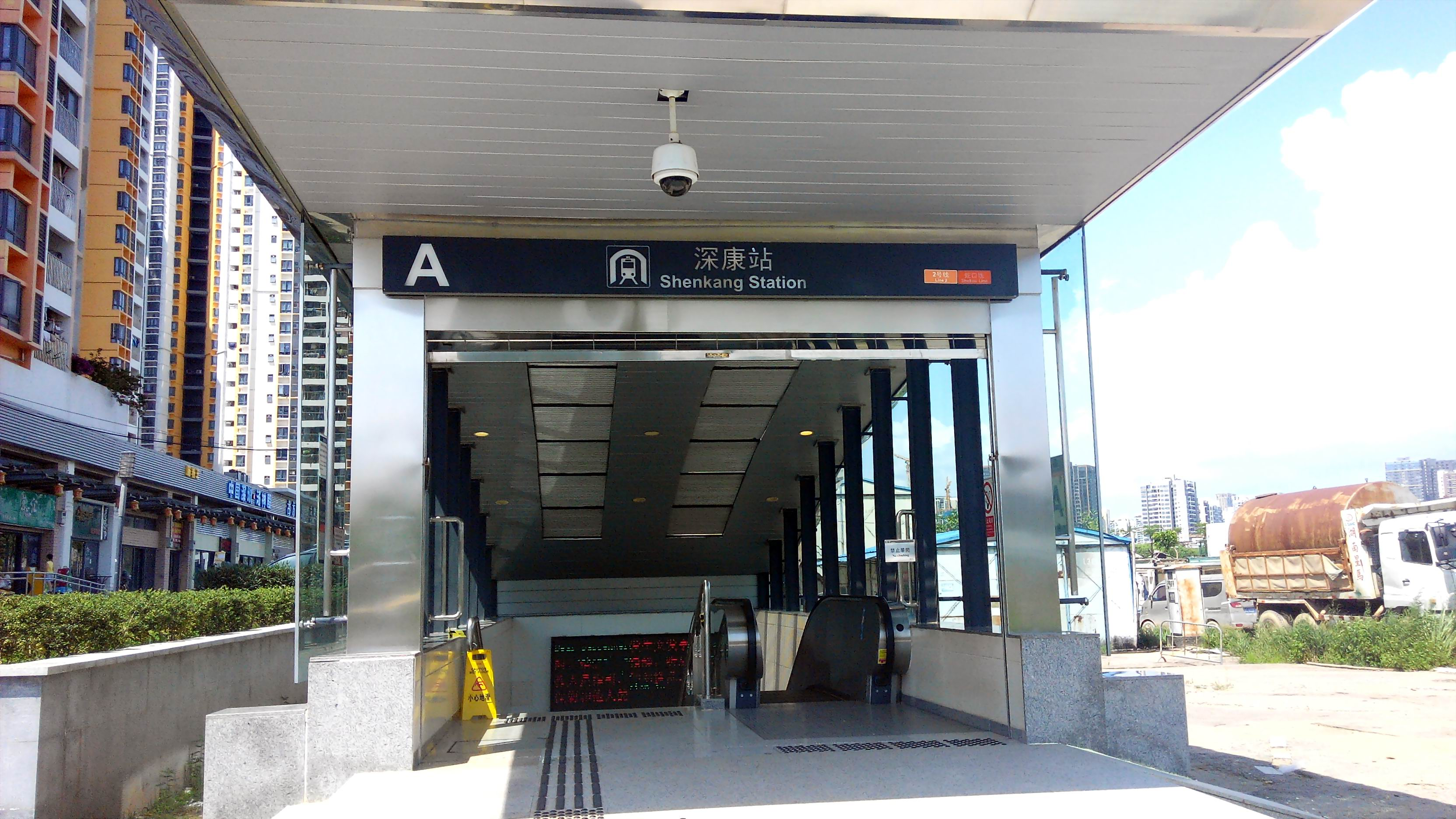

Chinese name
- Chinese: 深康
Transcriptions
Standard Mandarin
- Hanyu Pinyin: Shēn Kāng
Yue: Cantonese
- Jyutping: Sam1 Hong1

General information
- Location: Futian District, Shenzhen, Guangdong; China
- Operator: SZMC (Shenzhen Metro Group)
- Line: Line 2
- Platforms: 2 (1 island platform)
- Tracks: 2

Construction
- Structure type: Underground
- Accessible: Yes

Other information
- Station code: 214

History
- Opened: 28 June 2011 (15 years ago)

Services
Preceding station	Shenzhen Metro	Following station
Qiaocheng North towards Chiwan	Line 2	Antuo Hill towards Liantang (Line 8: Xichong)
Route map
Location

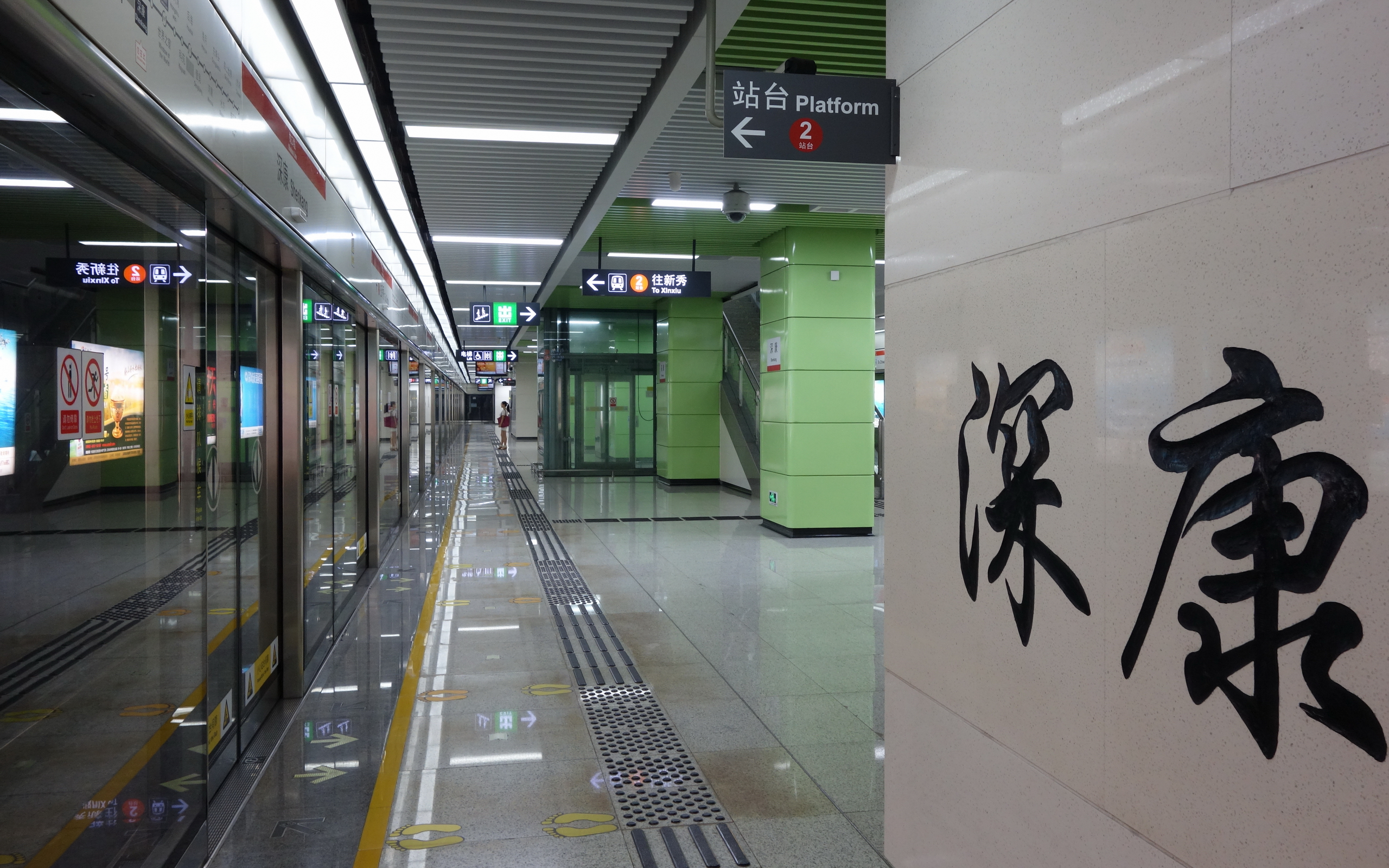
Platform level

Shenkang station (Chinese: 深康站; pinyin: Shēnkāng Zhàn; Jyutping: sam1 hong1 zaam6) is a station on Line 2 and Line 8 of the Shenzhen Metro. It opened on 28 June 2011.

== Station layout ==
G	-	Exit
B1F; Concourse	Lobby	Customer Service, Shops, Vending machines, ATMs
B2F; Platforms	Platform	← Line 2 towards Chiwan (Qiaocheng North)
B2F; Platforms	Island platform, doors will open on the left
B2F; Platforms	Platform	Line 8 towards Xichong (Antuo Hill) →

== Exits ==
Exit	Destination
Exit A	Qiaocheng East Road (W)
Exit B	Qiaocheng East Road (E), Qiaoxiang 3rd Road
Exit C	Qiaocheng East Road (W), Youlin Road
