= Line 7 (Shenzhen Metro) =

Metro line in Shenzhen, China

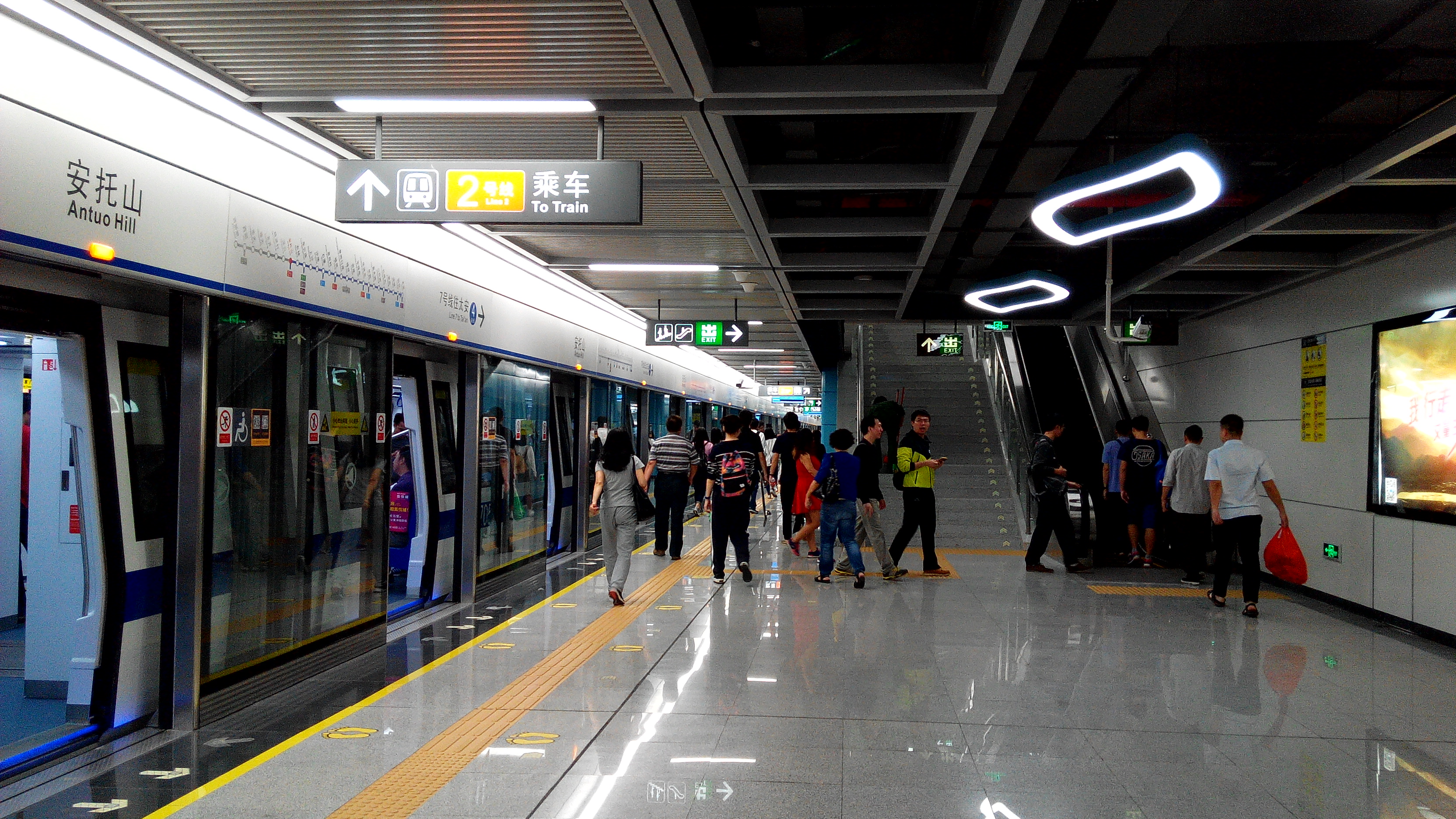
- CRRC Changchun train at Antuo Hill station

Overview
- Native name: 七号线; 七號線; cat^{1} hou^{6} sin^{3}; Qī hào xiàn
- Status: Operational
- Locale: Shenzhen, China
- Termini: SZU Lihu Campus; Tai'an
- Stations: 29
- Color on map: Blue (#0035ad)

Service
- Type: Rapid transit
- System: Shenzhen Metro
- Operator(s): SZMC (Shenzhen Metro Group)
- Depot(s): Shenyun depot Antuo Hill stabling yard
- Rolling stock: CRRC Changchun (701-741/742)(6A/3A+3A)
- Daily ridership: 723,000 (Highest single day recorded on 31 December 2024)

History
- Opened: 28 October 2016; 9 years ago

Technical
- Line length: 32.84 km (20.41 mi)
- Number of tracks: Double-track
- Character: Underground
- Track gauge: 1,435 mm (4 ft 8 1/2 in) standard gauge
- Electrification: 1,500 V DC (overhead line)
- Operating speed: 80 km/h (50 mph)
- Signalling: CBTC Moving block

Line 7 of the Shenzhen Metro has a length of 32.84 km (20.41 mi) and a total of 29 stations. It connects SZU Lihu Campus to Tai'an, travelling East–West across Shenzhen in a "V" shape. Construction started on 23 October 2012, with track laying complete in April 2016. The line started service on 28 October 2016.

== History ==
Segment	Commencement	Length	Station(s)	Name
Xili Lake — Tai'an	28 October 2016	30.173 km (18.75 mi)	27	(initial phase)
Xili Lake — SZU Lihu Campus	28 December 2024	2.36 km (1.47 mi)	2	Phase 2 (east extension)

== Stations ==
Service routes		Station name		Connections	Nearby bus stops	Distance km		Location
Service routes		English	Chinese	Connections	Nearby bus stops	Distance km		Location
●		SZU Lihu Campus	深大丽湖	27	43 74 81 122 B617 B818 M176 M459 Express 23（高快23）	0.00	0.00	Nanshan
●		Peking University	北大		M176	1.03	1.03	Nanshan
●		Xili Lake	西丽湖		10 36 49 66 101 104 226 M118 M176 M369 M492	1.33	2.36	Nanshan
●		Xili	西丽	5 27	19 36 54 66 67 74 81 101 104 122 226 233 235 237 316 325 325B 326 332 382 392 392区间 797 B604 B708 B796 B797 E19 M203 M243 M299 M343 M345 M369 M385 M393 M429 M459 M492 N8 Peak-time 75（高峰75） Peak-time 93（高峰93） Peak-time 94（高峰94） Peak-time 104（高峰104）	2.03	4.39	Nanshan
●		Chaguang	茶光		19 36 54 66 67 74 81 101 226 233 237 316 325 332 392 392区间 B604 B708 M203 M243 M299 M343 M345 M429 M492 N8 Peak-time 69（高峰69） Peak-time 93（高峰93） Peak-time 94（高峰94） Peak-time 104（高峰104）	0.73	5.12	Nanshan
●		Zhuguang	珠光	29	19 72 104 201 235 316 325 326 334 B707 M203 M369 M474 N8 Peak-time 26（高峰26） Peak-time 69（高峰69）	1.13	6.25	Nanshan
●		Longjing	龙井		19 26 58 67 72 201 235 316 325 326 334 B707 M203 M369 M474 N8 Peak-time 62（高峰62） Peak-time 69（高峰69）	1.55	7.80	Nanshan
●		Taoyuancun	桃源村		19 26 41 58 67 72 104 201 235 316 325 326 334 B706 B707 M203 M369 M474 N8 Peak-time 49（高峰49） Peak-time 62（高峰62） Peak-time 69（高峰69）	0.88	8.68	Nanshan
●	●	Shenyun	深云		41 201 235 B729 M240 M358 M364	1.28	9.96	Nanshan
●	|	Antuo Hill	安托山	2 8	374 B733	1.83	11.79	Futian
●	|	Nonglin	农林		70 73 107 108 326 328 374 B611 B697 M312 M500	1.97	13.76	Futian
●	|	Chegongmiao	车公庙	1 9 11	21 26 28 79 101 113 121 123 202 204 209 213 222 223 234 303 324 326 338 365 372 M372 M391 M392 M413 M414 M435 M447 M448 M500 N4 N6 Peak-time 18（高峰18） Peak-time 62（高峰62） Peak-time 119（高峰119）	1.58	15.34	Futian
●	|	Shangsha	上沙	22	26 28 44 71 80 103 121 202 215 303 317 322 339 362 372 374 377 B689 M347 M362 M370 M433 M453 M500 Futian-FTZ 1（福田保税区1）	1.50	16.84	Futian
●	|	Shawei	沙尾		26 44 71 80 103 121 202 303 317 322 339 372 377 B685 B689 M347 M362 M370 M433 M453 M500	0.84	17.68	Futian
●	|	Shixia	石厦	3	28 34 73 202 303 372 B689 K113 M370 M389 M390 Peak-time 14（高峰14）	1.37	19.05	Futian
●	|	Huanggangcun	皇岗村		28 34 63 73 202 303 372 385 B689 B858 K113 M370 N10	0.63	19.68	Futian
●	|	Fumin	福民	4 10	4 26 28 52 60 62 73 103 202 203 225 235 303 339 362 372 377 385 B689 B858 M204 M362 M370 M389 M441 M476 N9 Peak-time 21（高峰21）	0.63	20.31	Futian
●	|	Huanggang Checkpoint	皇岗口岸		9 23 26 121 235 313 325 326 338 357 362 366 M433 N25 Airport 9（机场9）	0.85	21.16	Futian
|	|	Fulin	福邻			1.04	22.20	Futian
●	|	Chiwei	赤尾		23 28 52 73 214 229 337 366 369 372 382 J1 M362 M463	0.80	23.00	Futian
●	|	Huaqiang South	华强南	11	9 13 14 23 32 38 62 63 214 216 225 317 377 385 391 B622 B812 M370 M374 N10 N14 Peak-time 106（高峰106）	0.76	23.76	Futian
●	|	Huaqiang North	华强北	2 8	65 67 80 302区间 M202 M389 M476	0.70	24.46	Futian
●	|	Huaxin	华新	3	10 13 41 59 64 67 108 123 225 236 303 311 383 385 K105 N6 Peak-express 4（高快4） Peak-time 119（高峰119）	0.62	25.08	Futian
●	|	Huangmugang	黄木岗	14	9 11 12 46 58 59 79 102 107 111 207 209 213 216 234 302 302区间 317 317区间 320 322 323 333 357 365 371 379 398 B615 B622 E2 E5 E11 E12 E20 M201 M202 M203 M369 M401 M405 M414 M460 M481 N6 N12 N25 U1 Peak-time 95（高峰95） Sightseeing 2（观光2）	0.80	25.88	Futian
●	|	Bagualing	八卦岭	6	323 M152 M156	1.16	27.04	Futian
●	|	Hongling North	红岭北	9	5 8 Peak-time 29（Original 9） 23 57 69 79 85 222 321 323 385 E8 E25 M105 M193 M360 M389 M463 N6 N16 N17 N25	1.02	28.06	Luohu
●	|	Sungang	笋岗	17	18 57 63 69 80 225 303 322 323 333 366 371 381 323区间 366区间 M132 M482 M406 N10	0.71	28.77	Luohu
●	|	Honghu	洪湖		1 27 80 82 213 303 307 312 320 322 323 357 363 366 369 371 377 977 M183 M192 M203 M239 M402 M403 M404 M406 M408 M414 M437 M526 M555 N7 N19 Holiday 12、Peak-time 32（高峰32） Peak-express 20 （高快20）	1.26	30.03	Luohu
●	|	Tianbei	田贝	3	1 2 40 57 59 62 83 107 203 242 320 333 376 977 M482 N2 N6 N7	0.70	30.73	Luohu
●	|	Tai'an	太安	5	2 23 308 363 376 B840 M364 M437 Dameisha-holiday 2（大梅沙假日2）	1.23	31.96	Luohu
	●	Wenti Park (Note: The station is staff-only. Not open to public.)	文体公园					Nanshan

== Staff-only branch ==
A branch to Wenti Park station is operating. Wenti Park station is a staff-only station.

== Rolling stock ==
In 2014, Shenzhen Metro Group purchased 70 trains (420 carriages) from CNR Changchun Railway Vehicles for the future Line 7 and Line 9, in which Line 7 will use 41 while Line 9 will use 29. The first train arrived in mid-March 2016.

Type	Date of manufacture	Series	Sets	Serial number	Assembly	Notes
Type A	2015–2016	A-size stock	41	0701-0741	Tc+Mp+M+M+Mp+Tc	Manufactured by CRRC Changchun Railway Vehicles
