= Tai'an station (Shenzhen Metro) =

Metro station in Shenzhen, Guangdong, China

Tai'an 太安
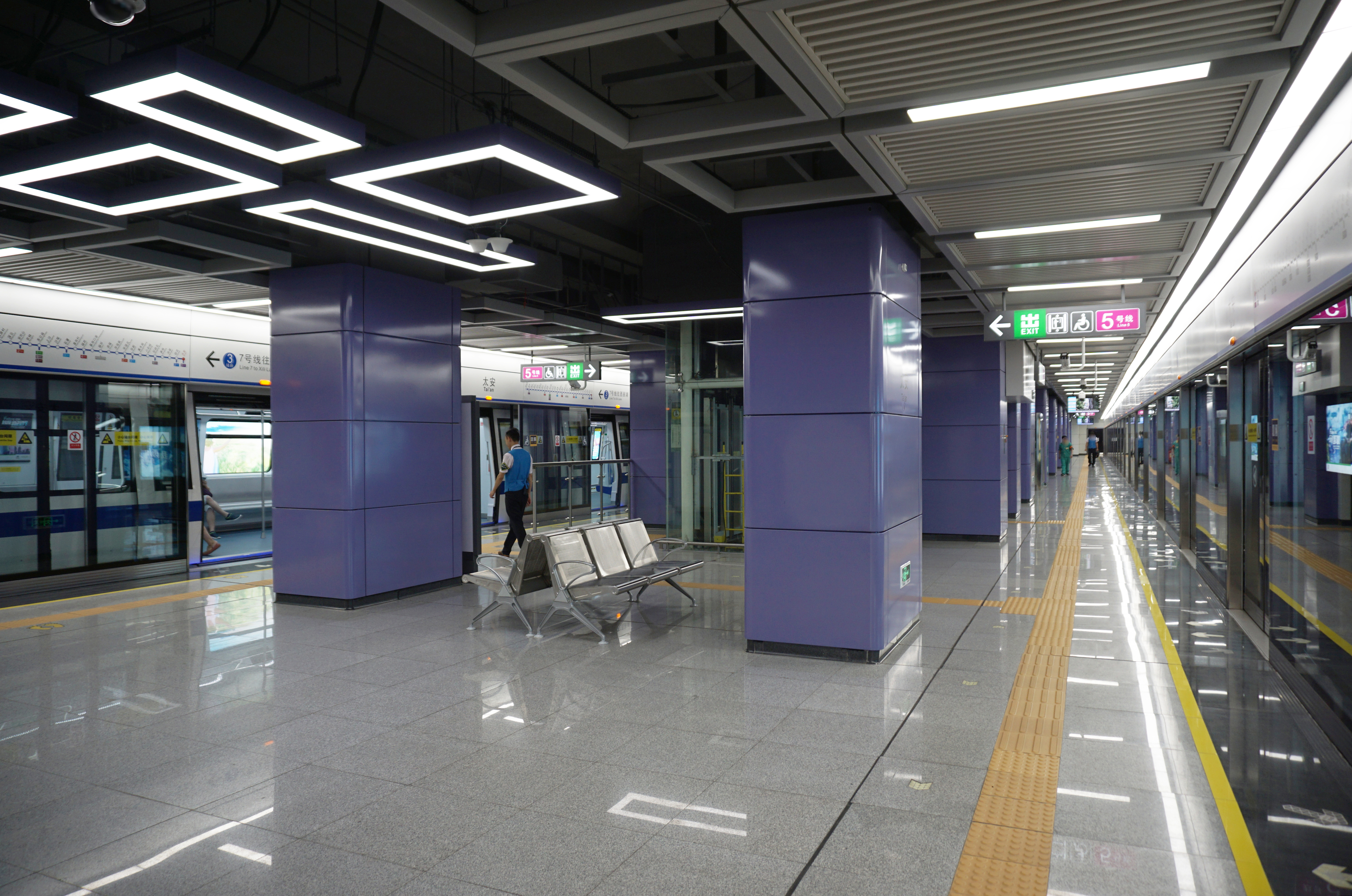
- Line 7 platform

General information
- Location: Dongxiao Road, Donghu Subdistrict, Luohu District, Shenzhen, Guangdong; China
- Coordinates: 22°34′24″N 114°8′13″E
- Operated by: SZMC (Shenzhen Metro Group)
- Lines: Line 5; Line 7
- Platforms: 4 (2 island platforms)
- Tracks: 4

Construction
- Structure type: Underground
- Accessible: Yes

History
- Opened: Line 5: 22 June 2011 (14 years ago); Line 7: 28 October 2016 (9 years ago)

Services
Preceding station	Shenzhen Metro	Following station
Yijing towards Grand Theater	Line 5	Buxin towards Chiwan
Tianbei towards SZU Lihu Campus	Line 7	Terminus
Track layout
Location

Tai'an station (Chinese: 太安站; pinyin: Tài'ān Zhàn; Jyutping: taai3 on1 zaam6) is an interchange station of Line 5 and Line 7 on the Shenzhen Metro. Line 5 platforms opened on 22 June 2011 and Line 7 platforms opened on 28 October 2016. This station is located under Dongxiao Road.

== Station layout ==
G	-	Exits A-E
B1F; Concourse	Lobby	Ticket Machines, Customer Service, Shops, Vending Machines
B2F; 5 Platforms	Platform	5 towards Chiwan (Buxin)
B2F; 5 Platforms	Island platform, doors will open on the left
B2F; 5 Platforms	Platform	5 towards Grand Theater (Yijing)
B3F; 7 Platforms	Platform	7 towards SZU Lihu Campus (Tianbei)
B3F; 7 Platforms	Island platform, doors will open on the left
B3F; 7 Platforms	Platform	7 termination platform

== Exits ==
Exit	Destination
Exit A	Lishui Road (N), Dongxiao Road (W), Buxin Road (W), Cuizhu Police Station of Luohu Branch of Shenzhen Public Security Bureau, Outpatient Department of Shenzhen Occupational Diseases Prevention & Treatment Hospital, Shenzhen Chronic Diseases Prevention & Treatment Center
Exit B	Dongxiao Road (W), Tai'an Road, Sinolink Primary School, Donghu Middle School, Sinolink Garden, Yuehai Xincun, Sinolink Garden Phase II, Shenzhen Ideal Jewellery Co., Ltd., Xili Road, Shenzhen Safari Park, Xilihu Holiday Resort, Lihu Garden, Xili Villa, Zijing Villa, Pingli Garden, Deyi Mingju
Exit C	Dongxiao Road (E), Tai'an Road, Taining Road, Dongle Road, Shuiku Primary School, Jade Bamboo Culture Plaza, Dong'an Garden, Dongle Garden, Shuiku Xincun, Sinolink Garden Phase IV(Dongjun), Sinolink Garden Lehu, Lishan Road, Xihu Linyu, Xuecheng Lvyuan, Guigu Apartment, Sangtaidan Huayuan
Exit D	Dongxiao Road (E), Buxin Road, Dongle Road, Dongle Garden, Lishui Road (S), Xihu Linyu, Xuecheng Lüyuan, Shenzhen Graduate School of Tsinghua University, University Town of Shenzhen (North Campus)
Exit E	Dongxiao Road (E), Taibai Road, Dongchang Road, Dongle Road, Buxin Primary School, Luohu District Cultural Center, Luohu Huanbao Building, Luohu District Maternity & Child Healthcare Hospital, Donghu Police Station of Luohu Branch of Shenzhen Public Security Bureau, Shenzhen Luohu District Family Planning Service Center, Zungfu Tellus Mercedes-Benz 4S Center, Sinolink Garden Phase III
