= SZU Lihu Campus station =

Shenzhen Metro Line 7 station

SZU Lihu Campus 深大丽湖
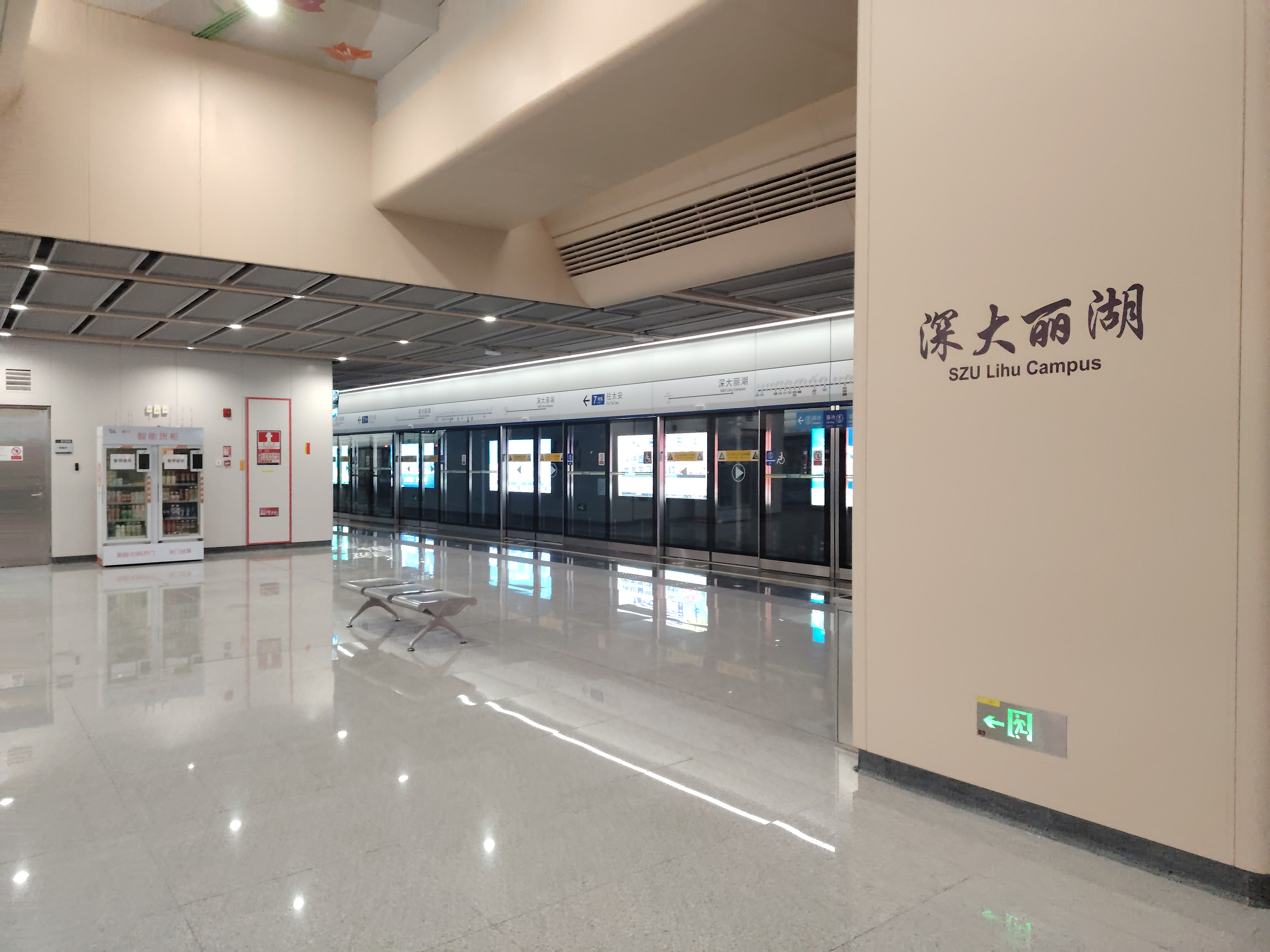
- Platform

Chinese name
- Simplified Chinese: 深大丽湖
- Traditional Chinese: 深大麗湖
Transcriptions
Standard Mandarin
- Hanyu Pinyin: Shēndà Lìhú
Yue: Cantonese
- Yale Romanization: Sāmdaai Laihwù
- Jyutping: Sam1daai6 Lai6wu4

General information
- Location: Youlan Road (幽蘭路); Nanshan District, Shenzhen, Guangdong; China
- Coordinates: 22°35′45.110″N 113°59′0.514″E
- Operator: SZMC (Shenzhen Metro Group)
- Line: Line 7
- Platforms: 2 (1 island platform)
- Tracks: 2

Construction
- Structure type: Underground
- Accessible: Yes

History
- Opened: 28 December 2024 (21 months ago)
- Former names: Xuefu Hospital (学府医院)

Services
Preceding station	Shenzhen Metro	Following station
Terminus	Line 7	Peking University towards Tai'an
Location

SZU Lihu Campus station (simplified Chinese: 深大丽湖站; traditional Chinese: 深大麗湖站; pinyin: Shēndà Lìhú Zhàn; Jyutping: Sam1 Daai6 Lai6 Wu4 Zaam6; Cantonese Yale: Sāmdaai Laihwù Jaahm) is a station and the western terminus on Line 7 of Shenzhen Metro. It opened on 28 December 2024, and is located in Nanshan District, next to Shenzhen University Lihu Campus and Shenzhen University General Hospital.

== Station layout ==
G	-	Exits A, C, D
B1F; Concourse	Lobby	Ticket Machines, Customer Service, Vending Machines
B2F; Platforms	Platform	7 towards Tai'an (Peking University)
B2F; Platforms	Island platform, doors will open on the left or right
B2F; Platforms	Platform	7 towards Tai'an (Peking University)

=== Entrances/exits ===
The station has 3 points of entry/exit.

- A: Shenzhen University Lihu Campus, Shenzhen University General Hospital
- C: Shenzhen University General Hospital, Tanglang New Estate
- D: Shenzhen Institute of Advanced Technology - Chinese Academy of Sciences, Southern University of Science and Technology
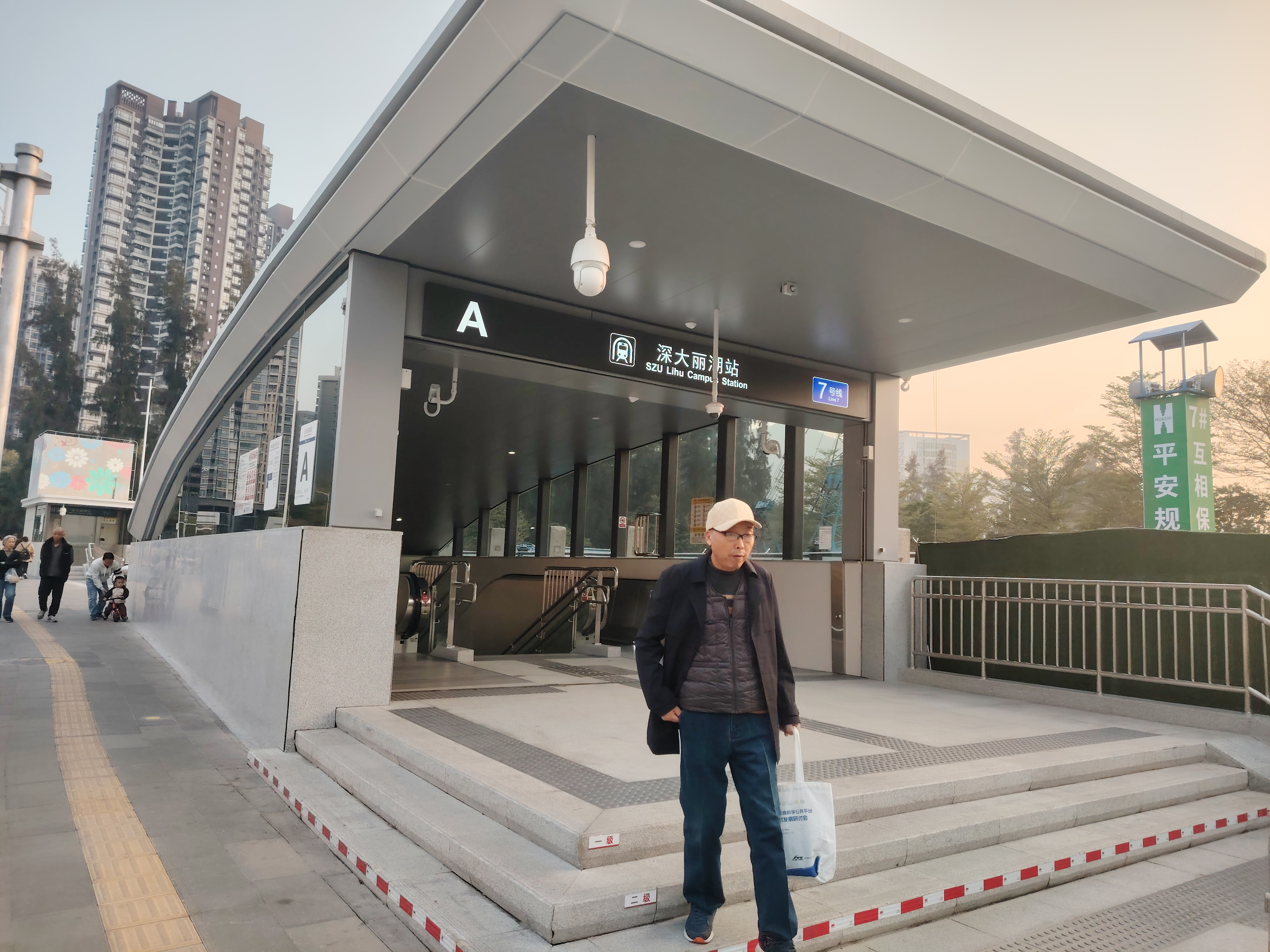
Entrance A

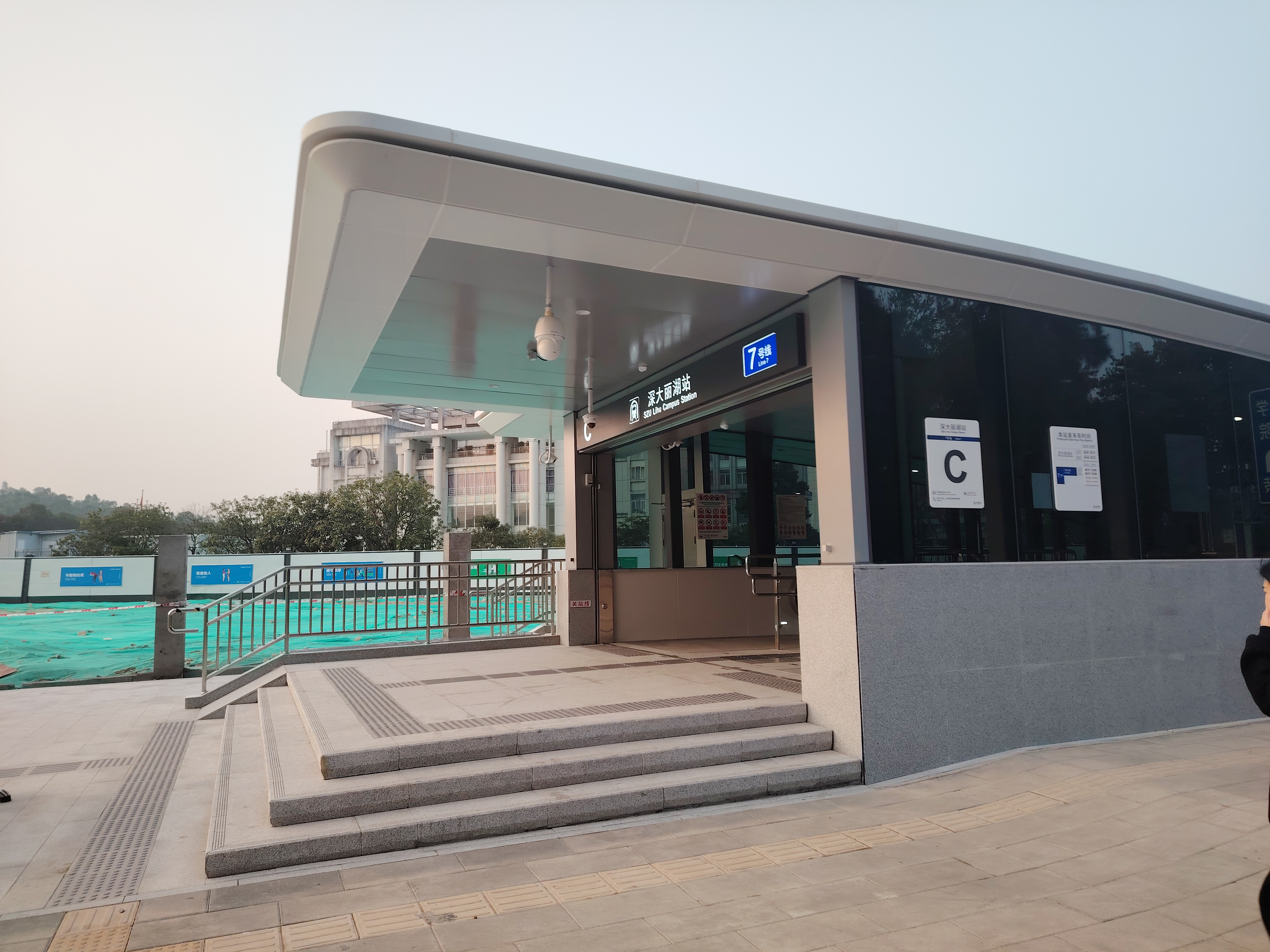
Entrance C

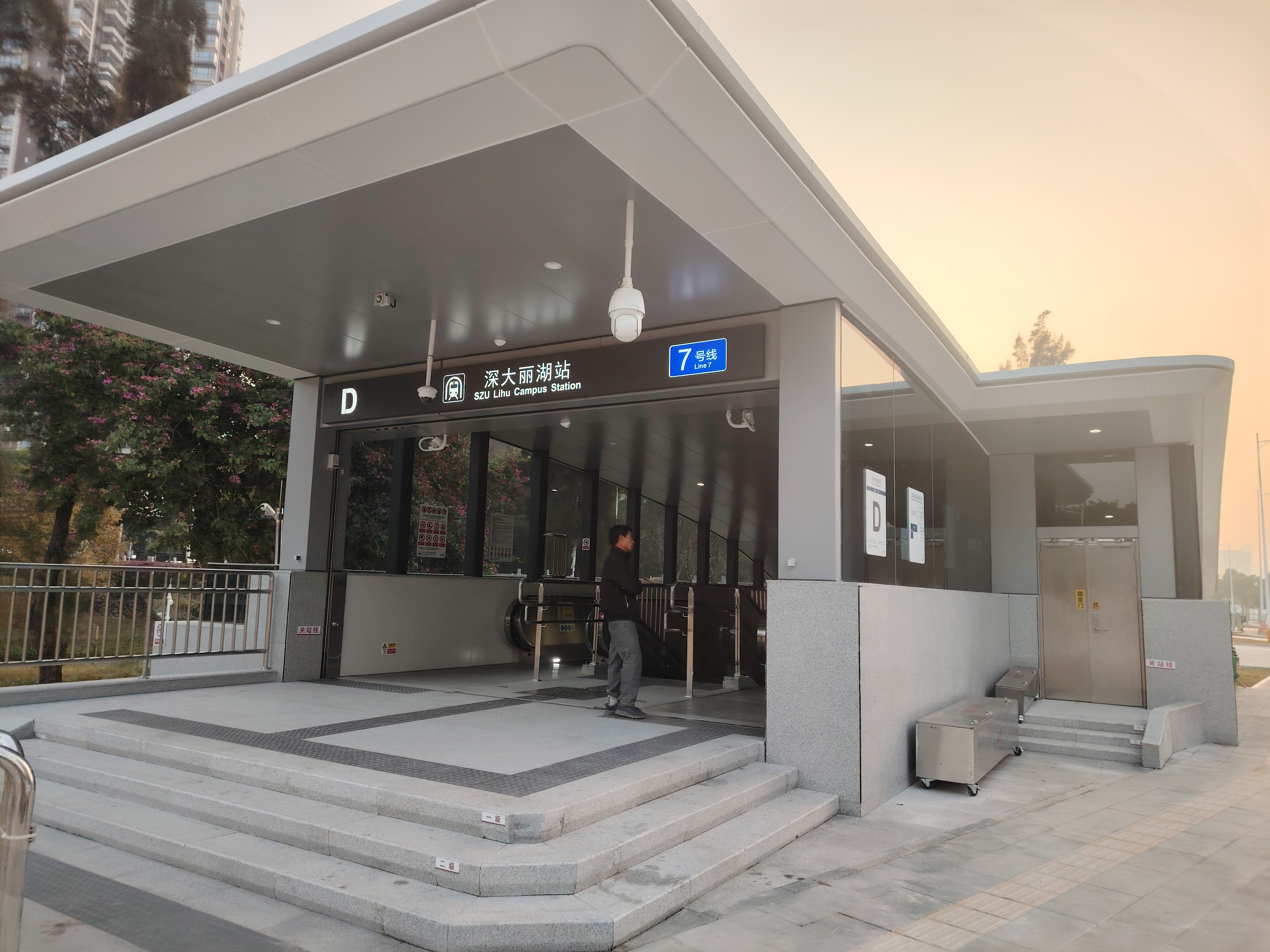
Entrance D
