= Huanggangcun station =

Metro station in Shenzhen, China

Huanggangcun 皇岗村
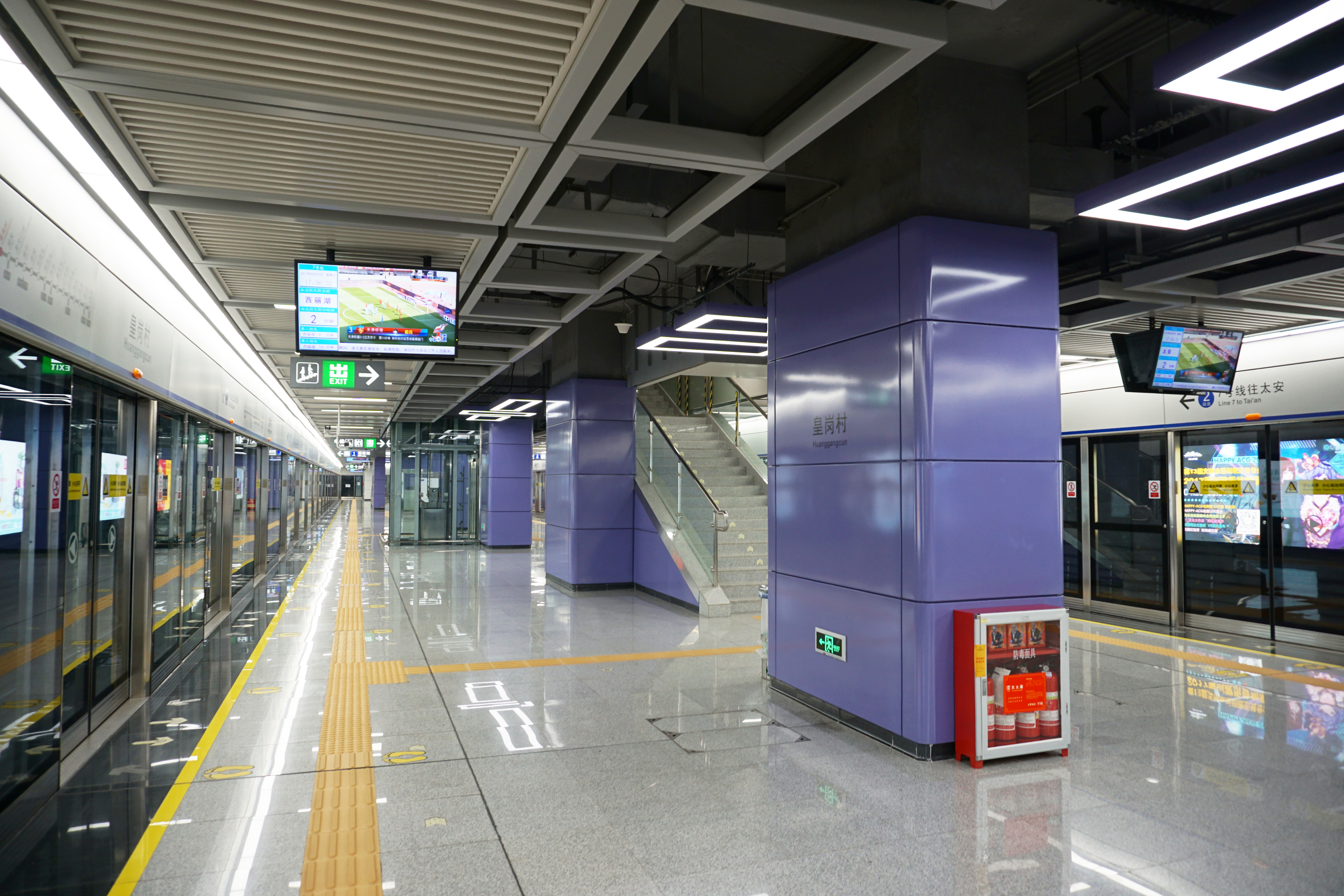
- Platform

General information
- Location: Futian District, Shenzhen, Guangdong; China
- Coordinates: 22°31′44″N 114°3′58″E
- Operated by: SZMC (Shenzhen Metro Group)
- Line: Line 7
- Platforms: 2 (1 island platform)
- Tracks: 2

Construction
- Structure type: Underground
- Accessible: Yes

History
- Opened: 28 October 2016 (9 years ago)

Services
Preceding station	Shenzhen Metro	Following station
Shixia towards SZU Lihu Campus	Line 7	Fumin towards Tai'an
Location

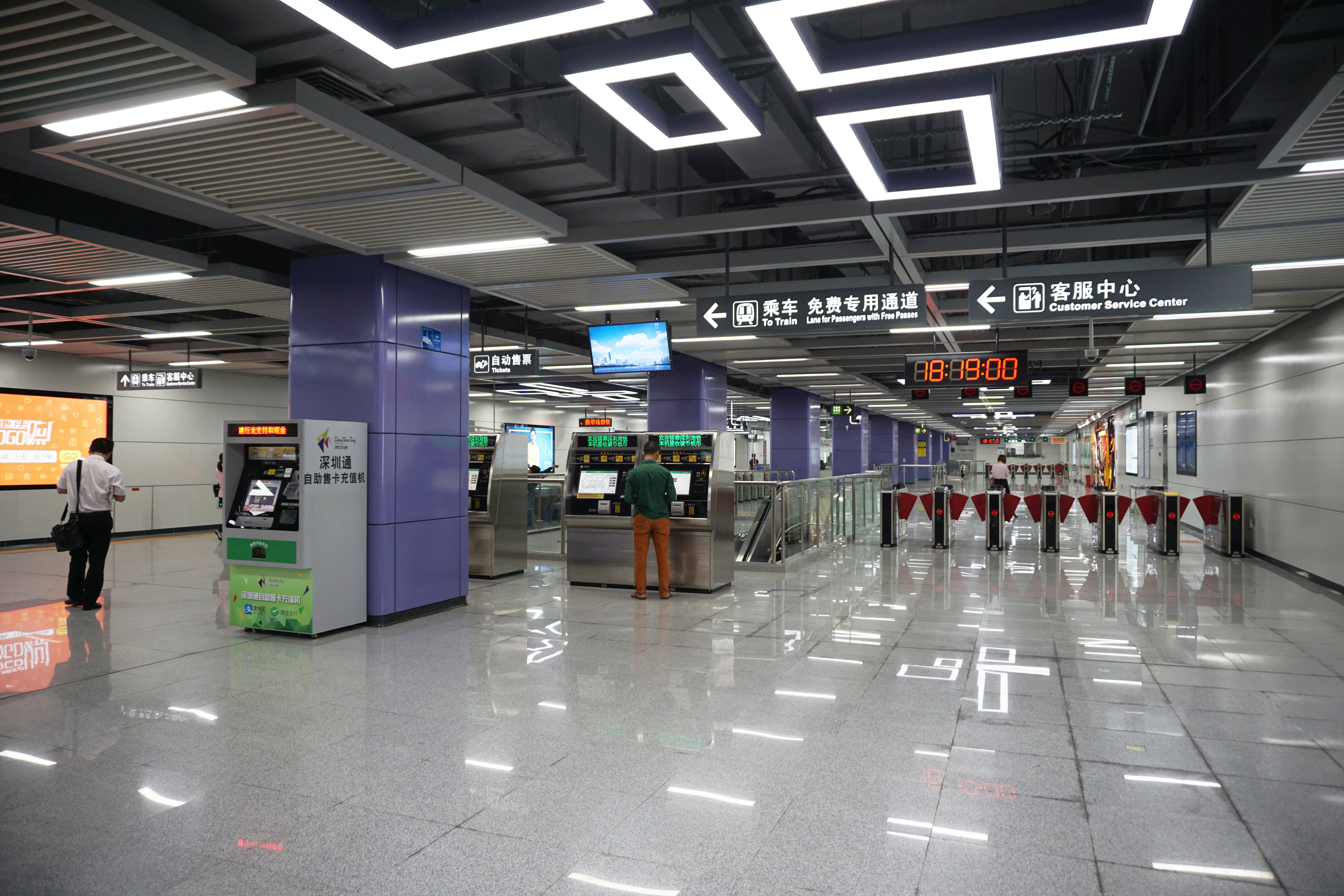
Concourse

Huanggangcun station (Chinese: 皇岗村站; pinyin: Huánggǎngcūn Zhàn) is a station on Line 7 of the Shenzhen Metro. It opened on 28 October 2016.

== Station layout ==
G	-	Exits A-E
B1F; Concourse	Lobby	Ticket Machines, Customer Service, Shops, Vending Machines
B2F; Platforms	Platform	7 towards SZU Lihu Campus (Shixia)
B2F; Platforms	Island platform, doors will open on the left
B2F; Platforms	Platform	7 towards Tai'an (Fumin)

== Exits ==
Exit		Destination
Exit A		Fumin Road (S), Yitian Road, Huanggang Xincun, Huanggang Park, Gonghe Shijia, Gaofa Chengchi Yuan
Exit B	B1	Fumin Road (S), Jintian Road, Shuiweicun
Exit B	B2	Fumin Road (S), Jintian Road, Shuiweicun
Exit C	C1	Fumin Road (N), Jintian Road, Huanggangcun, Huangxing Building, Yuanjing Primary School
Exit C	C2	Fumin Road (N), Jintian Road, Huanggangcun, Huangxing Building, Yuanjing Primary School
Exit D		Fumin Road (N), Central Garden, Huanggang Sanlong Garden, Youminzhuang
Exit E		Fumin Road (N), Yitian Road, Huanggang Primary School, Jinxiuyuan, Huangda Dongfang Yayuan
