= Shixia station =

Metro station in Shenzhen, Guangdong, China

Shixia 石厦
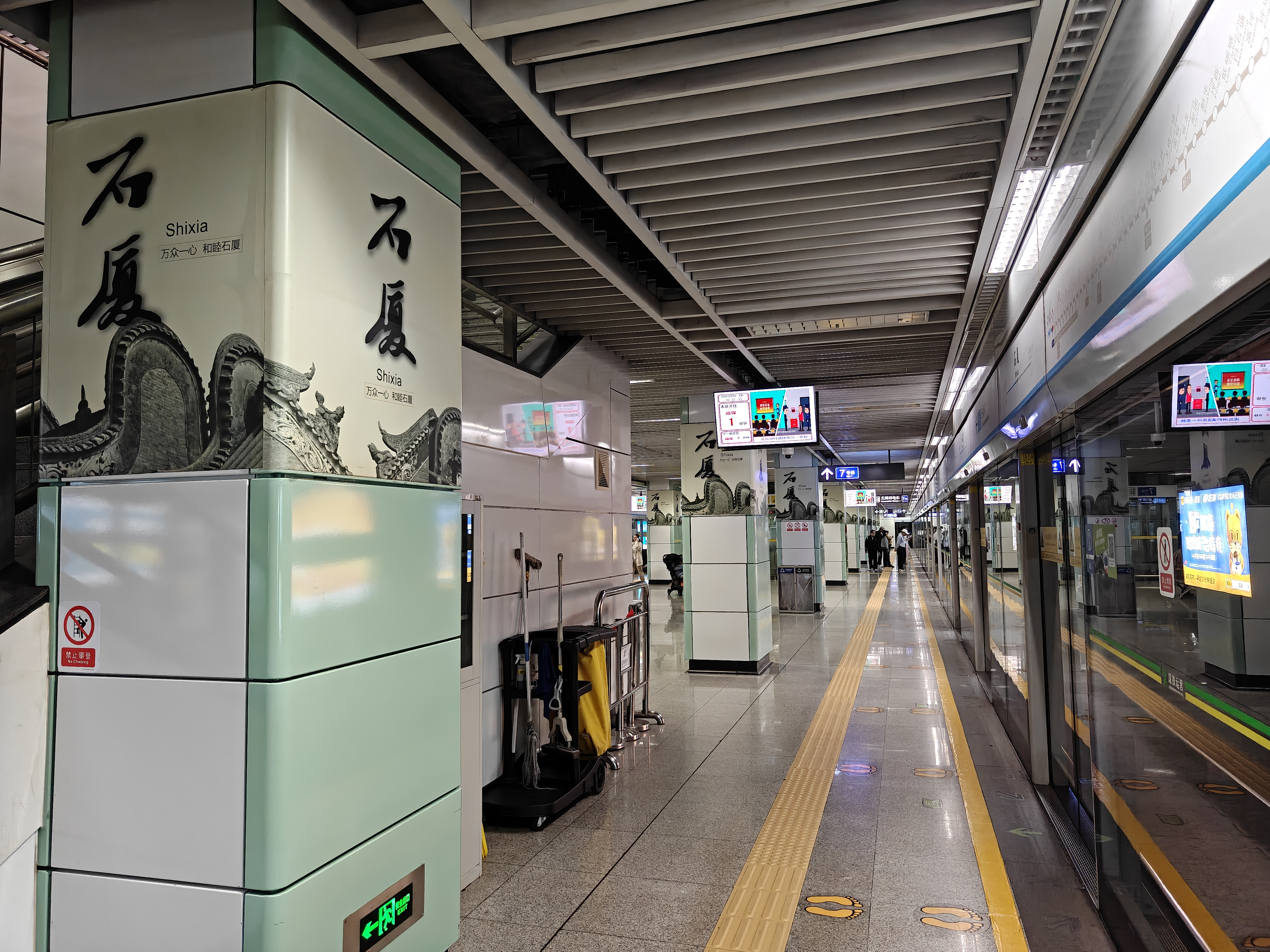
- Line 3 Platforms (2026)

Chinese name
- Chinese: 石厦
- Traditional Chinese: 石廈
- Literal meaning: Stone building
Transcriptions
Standard Mandarin
- Hanyu Pinyin: Shí Xià
Yue: Cantonese
- Yale Romanization: Sehk Hah Jaahm
- Jyutping: sek^{6} haa^{6} zaam^{6}

General information
- Location: Fubao Subdistrict, Futian District, Shenzhen, Guangdong; China
- Coordinates: 22°31′22″N 114°3′13″E
- Operated by: SZMC (Shenzhen Metro Group)
- Lines: Line 3; Line 7
- Platforms: 4 (2 island platforms)
- Tracks: 4

Construction
- Structure type: Underground
- Accessible: Yes

History
- Opened: Line 3: 28 June 2011 (14 years ago); Line 7: 28 October 2016 (9 years ago)

Services
Preceding station	Shenzhen Metro	Following station
Shopping Park towards Pingdi Liulian	Line 3	Yitian towards Futian Bonded Area
Shawei towards SZU Lihu Campus	Line 7	Huanggangcun towards Tai'an
Route map
Location

Shixia station (Chinese: 石厦; pinyin: Shíxià Zhàn; Jyutping: sek^{6} haa^{6} zaam^{6}; Cantonese Yale: Sehk Hah Jaahm) is an interchange station on Line 3 and Line 7 of the Shenzhen Metro. Line 3 platforms opened on 28 June 2011 and Line 7 platforms opened on 28 October 2016. This station is located under the intersection of Fumin Road, Shixia Street, and Shixia North 2nd Street.

== Station layout ==
G	-	Exits A, C, E, F, G
B1F; Concourse	Lobby	Ticket Machines, Customer Service, Shops, Vending Machines
B2F; 3 Platforms	Platform	3 towards Futian Bonded Area (Yitian)
B2F; 3 Platforms	Island platform, doors will open on the left
B2F; 3 Platforms	Platform	3 towards Pingdi Liulian (Shopping Park)
B3F; 7 Platforms	Platform	7 towards SZU Lihu Campus (Shawei)
B3F; 7 Platforms	Island platform, doors will open on the left
B3F; 7 Platforms	Platform	7 towards Tai'an (Huanggangcun)

== Exits ==
Exit	Picture	Destination
A		North Side of Fumin Road (E), Shixia North 3rd Street, Bolun Garden, Ruiheyuan, Mingyue Garden, Dongfang Xinyue House
C		Shixia North 2nd Street, Shixia North 4th Street, Shixia North 6th Street, Shixia School of Futian Primary School, Jindi Cuiyuan
E		North Side of Fumin Road (W), Shixia North 1st Street, Futian District Committee Bus Stop, Shixia Middle School of Futian, Central Park, Liyang Mingxia Ming Yuan, Beauty Star (Shixia Branch)
F		South Side of Fumin Road (W), Shenzhen Maternity & Child Healthcare Hospital, Xinghe Mingju, Zhongfu Building, Block A of Xintian Century Business Center,
G		North Side of Fumin Road (E), Shixia Street, Futian Branch of Shenzhen Public Security Bureau, Futian People's Procuratorate, Futian People's Court, Futian People's Government, Futian District Committee, Futian District Committee Bus Stop

== Gallery ==
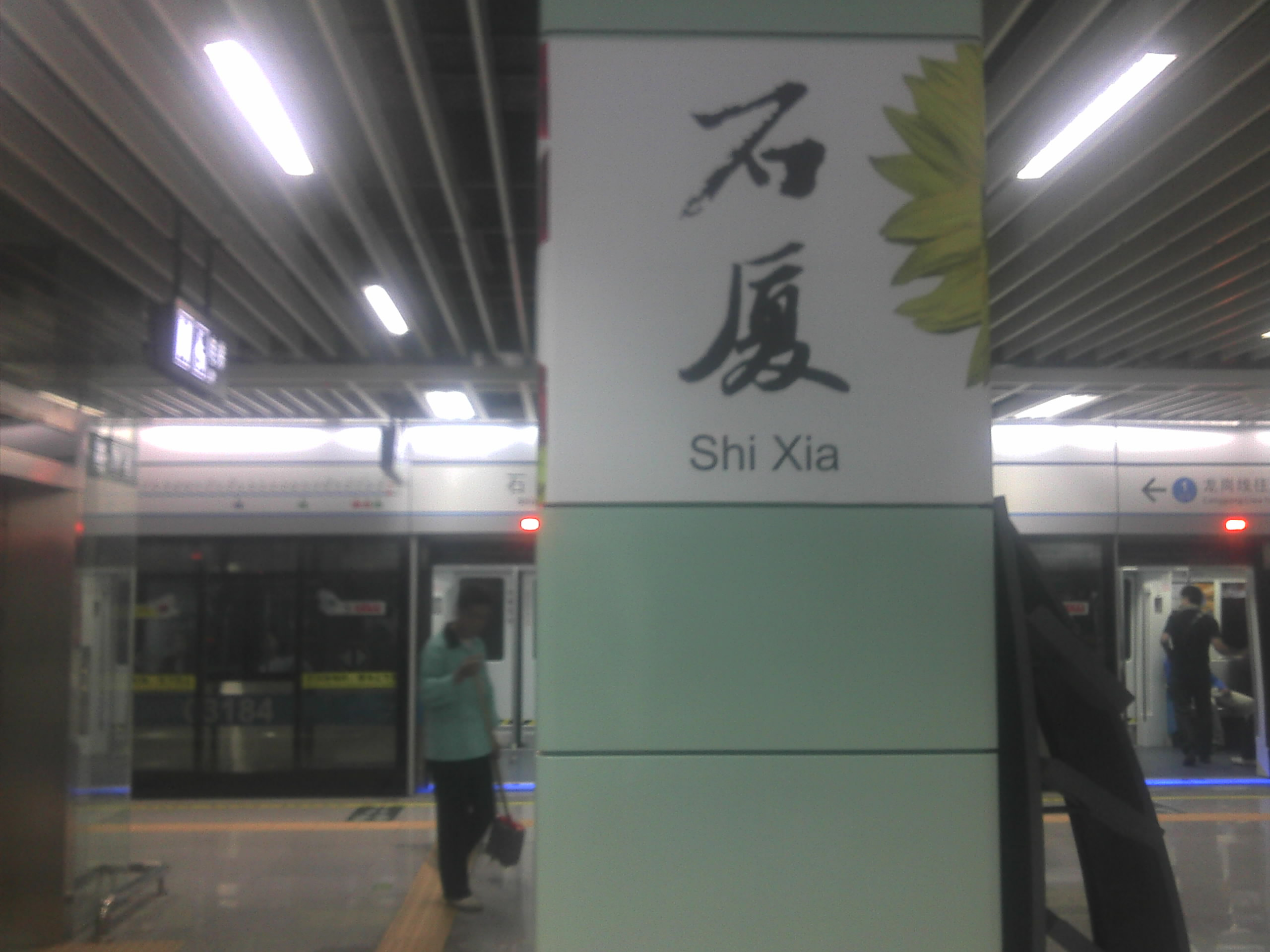
Line 3 (Longgang Line) Platform (2011)

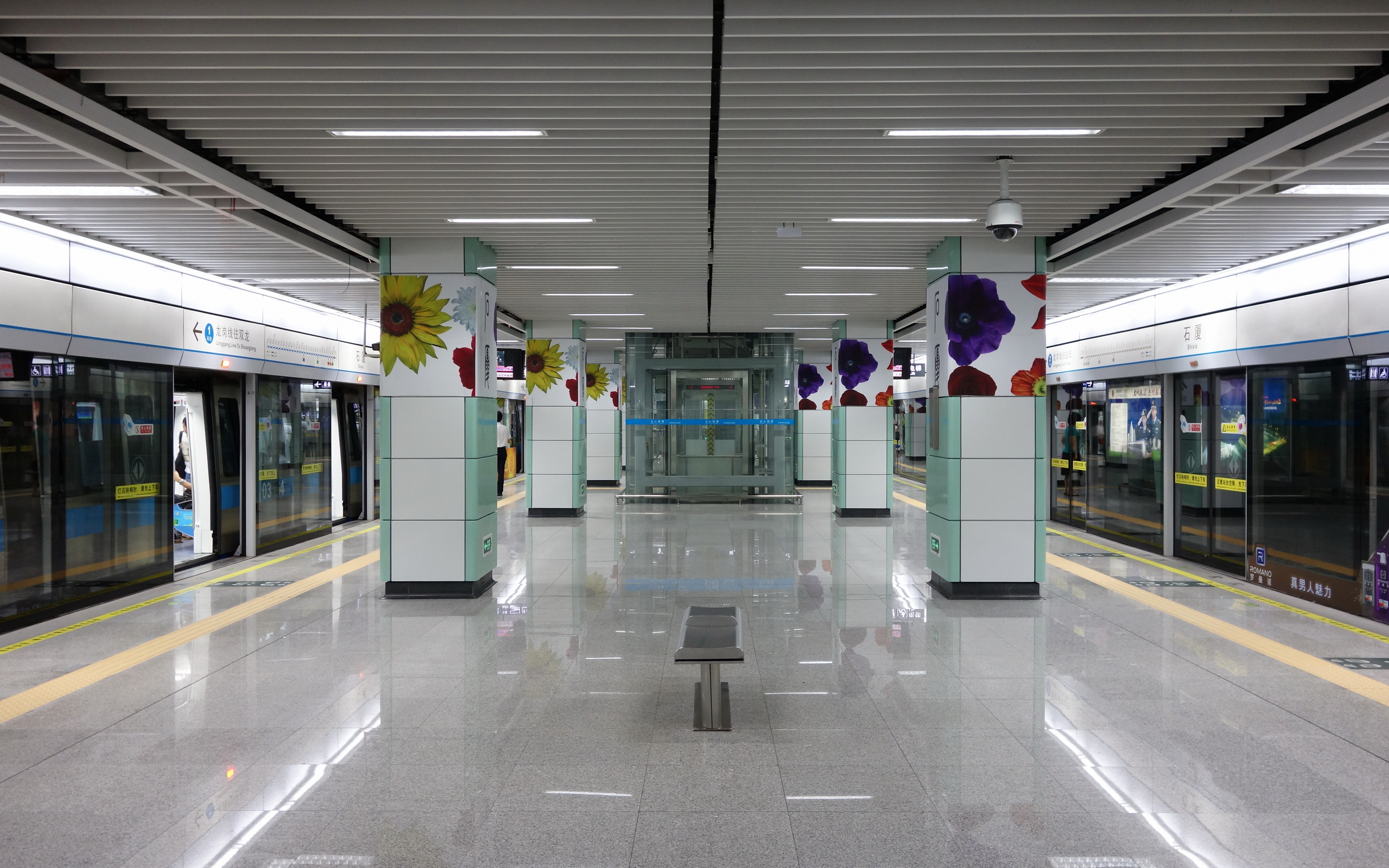
Line 3 (Longgang Line) Platform (2013)

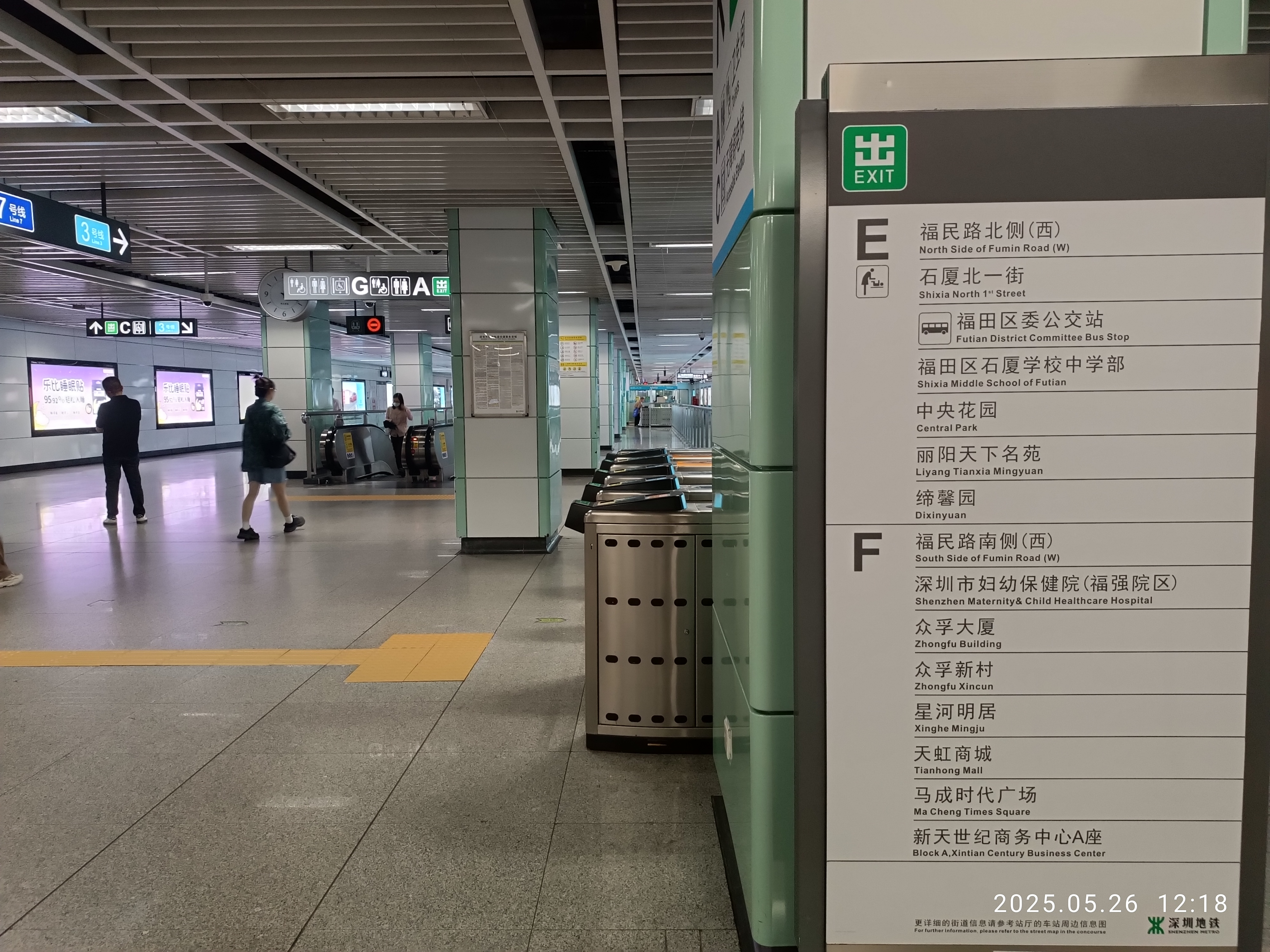
Line 3 Concourse (2025)

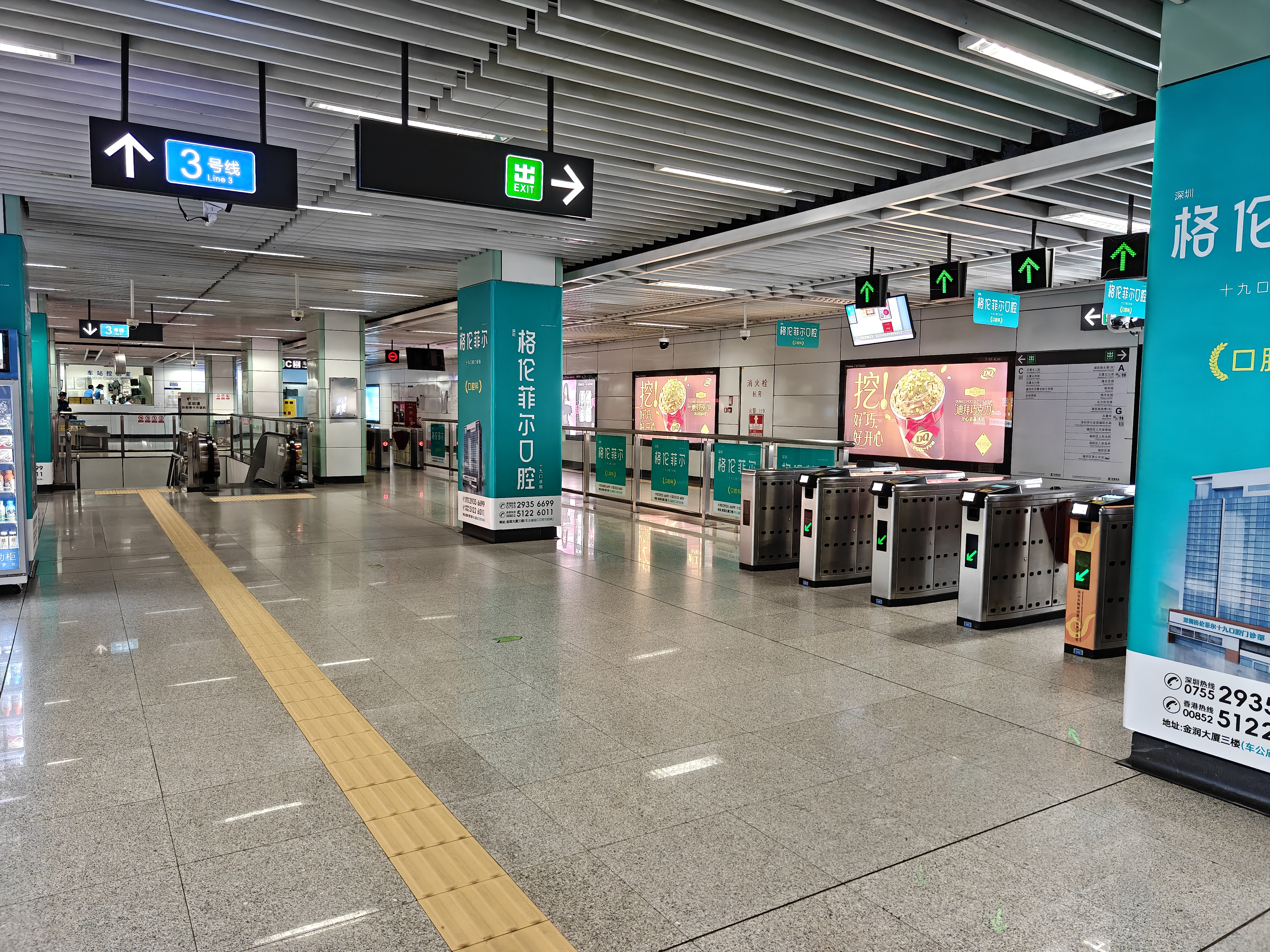
Line 3 Concourse (2026)

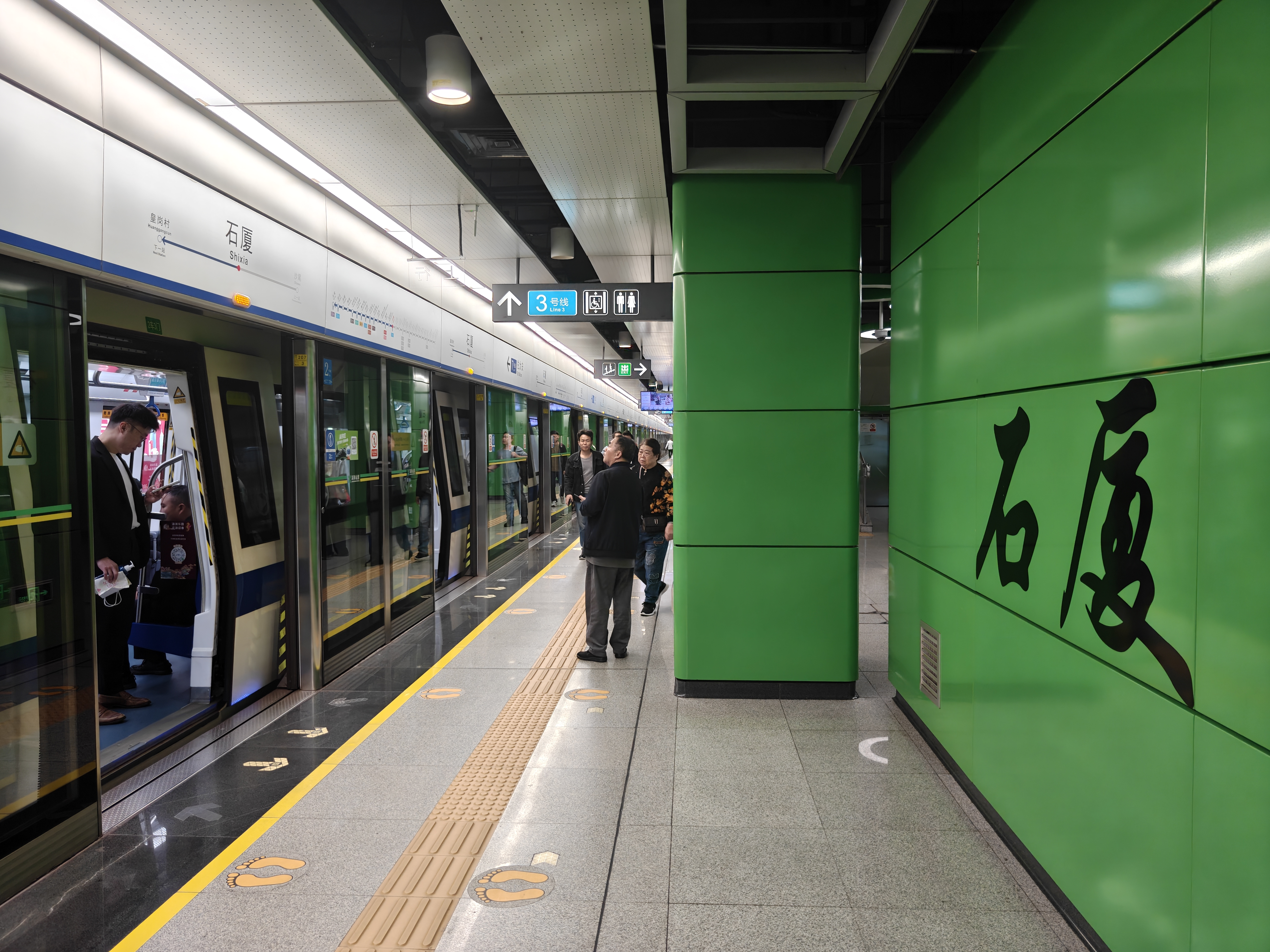
Line 7 Platform

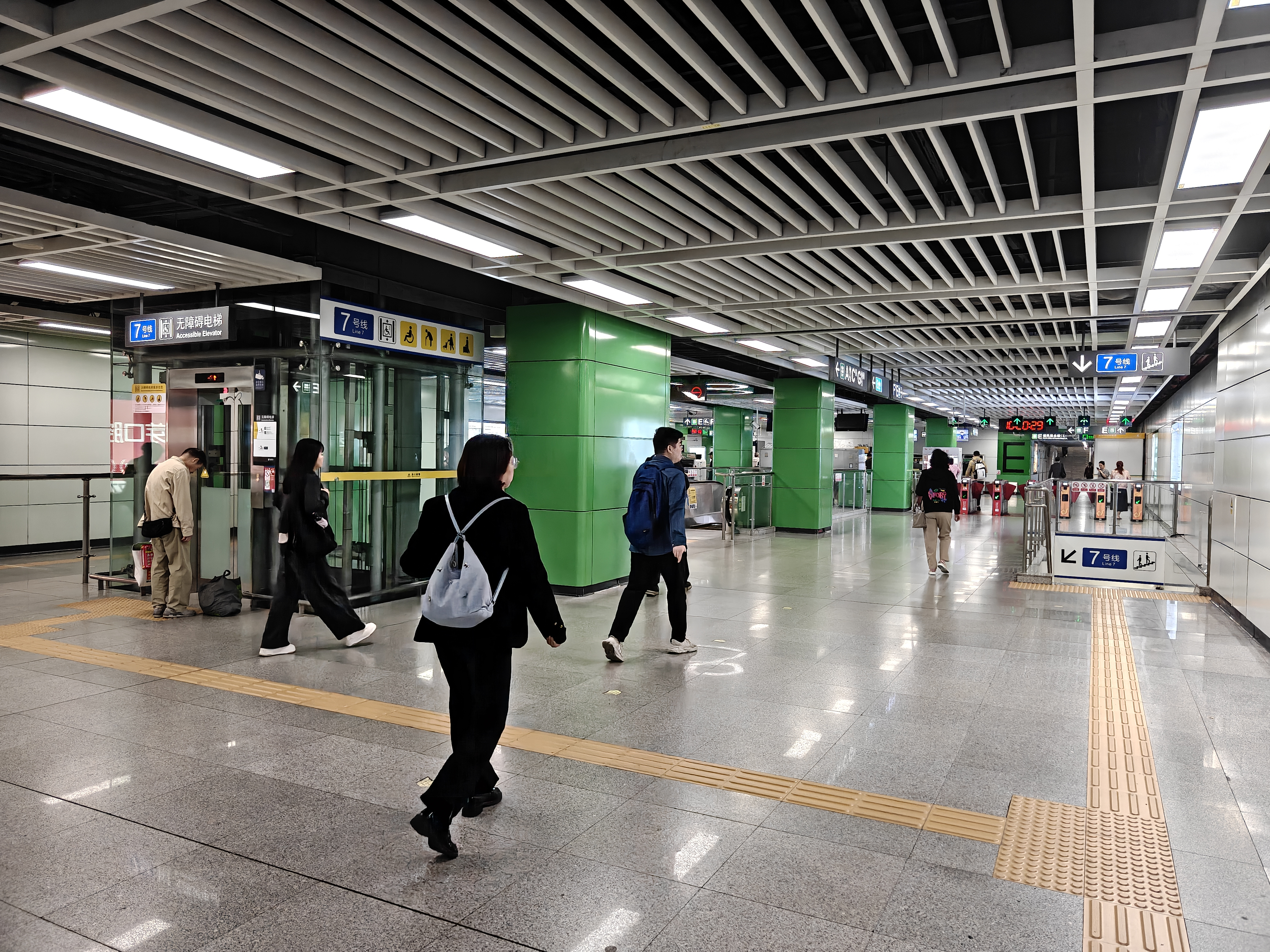
Line 7 Concourse
