= Shawei station =

Metro station in Shenzhen, China

Shawei 沙尾
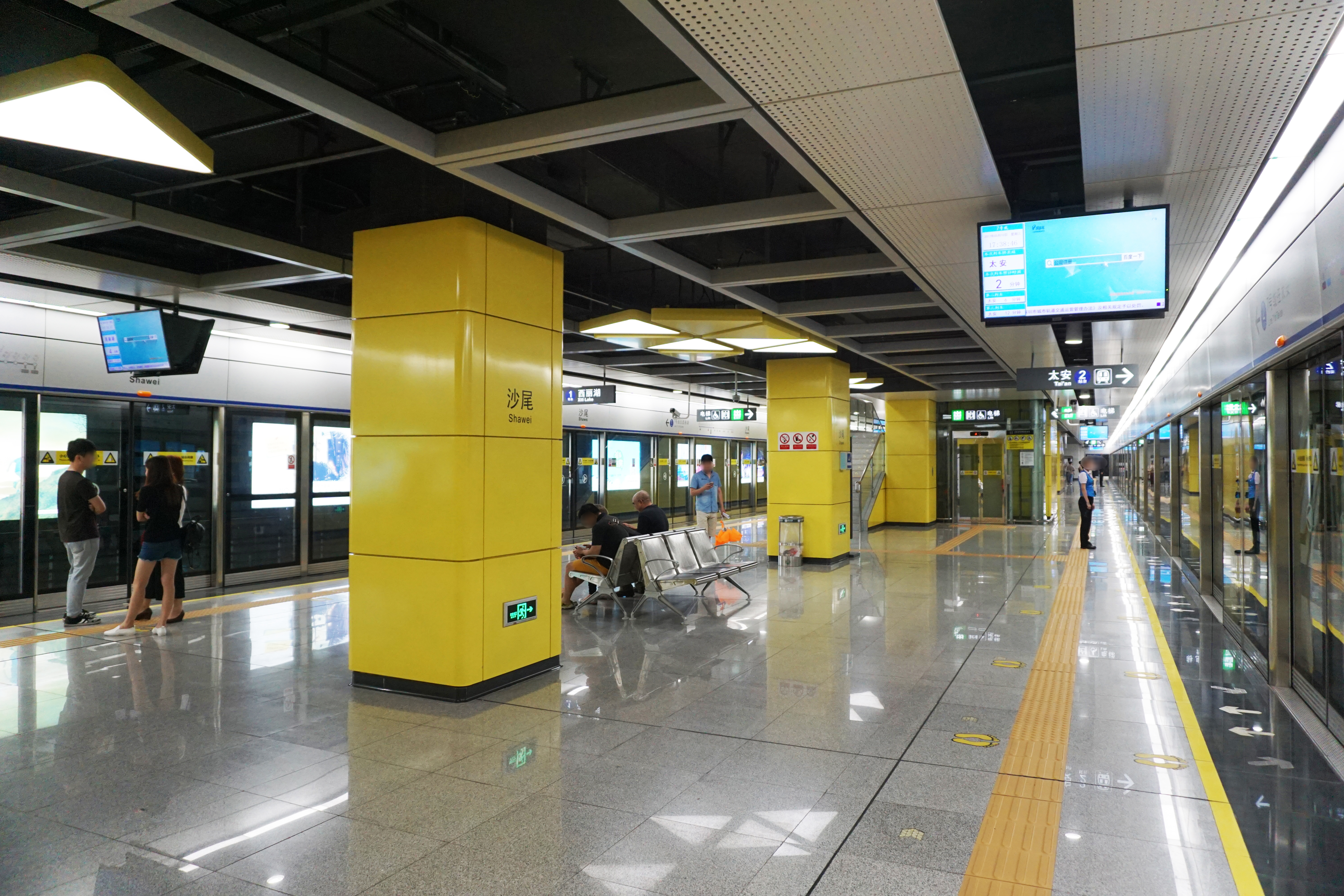
- Platform

General information
- Location: Futian District, Shenzhen, Guangdong; China
- Coordinates: 22°31′36″N 114°2′57″E
- Operated by: SZMC (Shenzhen Metro Group)
- Line: Line 7
- Platforms: 2 (1 island platform)
- Tracks: 2

Construction
- Structure type: Underground
- Accessible: Yes

History
- Opened: 28 October 2016 (9 years ago)

Services
Preceding station	Shenzhen Metro	Following station
Shangsha towards SZU Lihu Campus	Line 7	Shixia towards Tai'an
Location

Shawei station (Chinese: 沙尾站; pinyin: Shāwěi Zhàn) is a station on Line 7 of the Shenzhen Metro. It opened on 28 October 2016.

== Station layout ==
G	-	Exits A-D
B1F; Concourse	Lobby	Ticket Machines, Customer Service, Shops, Vending Machines
B2F; Platforms	Platform	7 towards SZU Lihu Campus (Shangsha)
B2F; Platforms	Island platform, doors will open on the left
B2F; Platforms	Platform	7 towards Tai'an (Shixia)

== Exits ==
Exit	Destination
Exit A	Fuqiang Road (S), Shawei Road, Gemdale Mingxuan, Administration Service Center of Futian Public Safety Sub-bureau, Executive Board of Futian People's Court, Ren'ai Hospital
Exit B	Fuqiang Road (S), Shawei Road, Yuansheng Xingyuan, Shaweicun, Galaxy Jinju, Shenzhen Culture Creative Park
Exit C	Fuqiang Road (N), Xinzhou 3rd Street (E)
Exit D	Fuqiang Road (N), Lvjing Garden, Baohong Yuan, Kaixinyuan
