= Shangsha station =

Metro station in Shenzhen, Guangdong, China

Shangsha 上沙
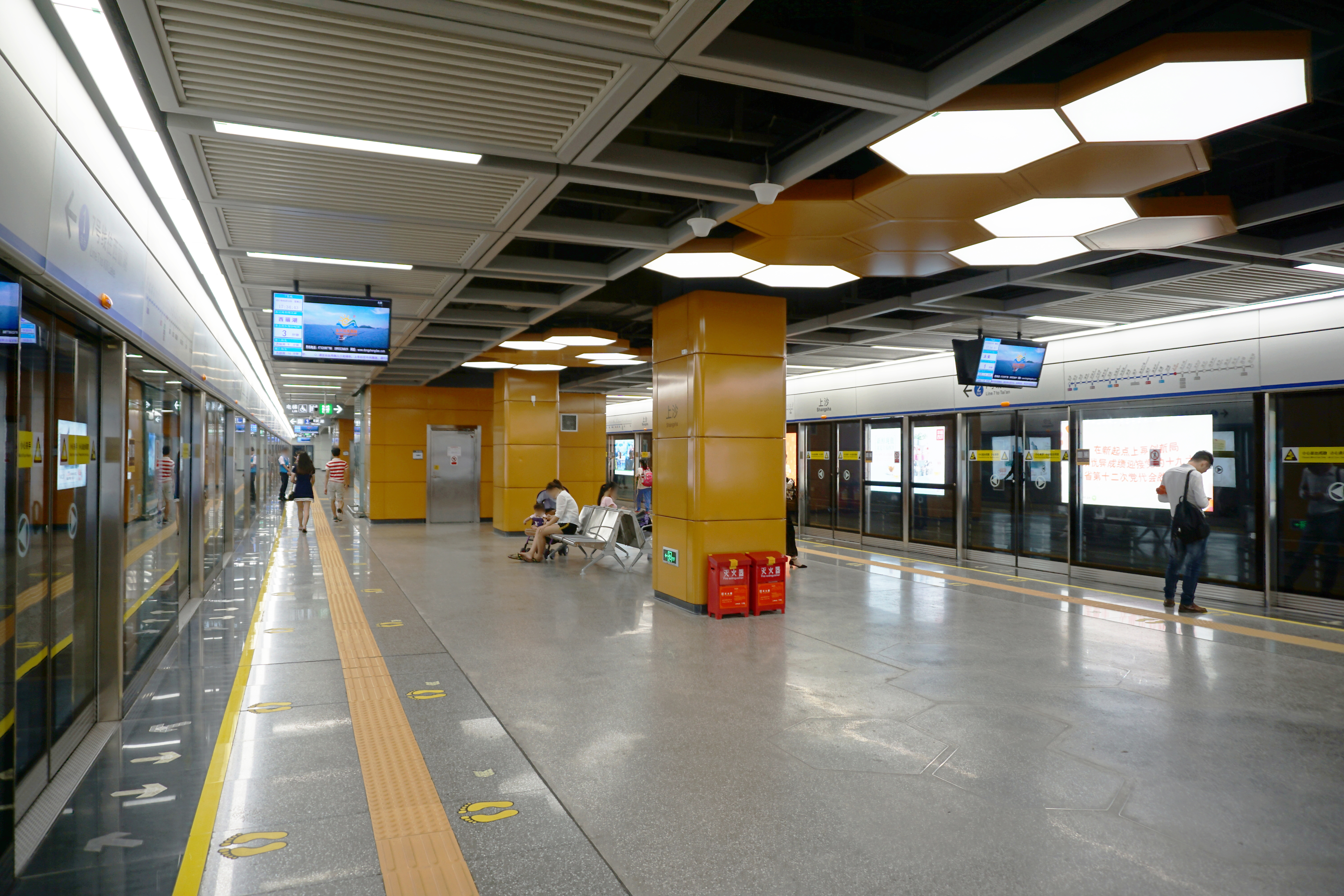
- Platform

General information
- Location: Futian District, Shenzhen, Guangdong; China
- Coordinates: 22°31′49″N 114°2′33″E
- Operated by: SZMC (Shenzhen Metro Group)
- Line: Line 7
- Platforms: 2 (1 island platform)
- Tracks: 2

Construction
- Structure type: Underground
- Accessible: Yes

History
- Opened: 28 October 2016 (9 years ago)

Services
| Preceding station | Shenzhen Metro | Following station |
|---|---|---|
| Chegongmiao towards SZU Lihu Campus | Line 7 | Shawei towards Tai'an |
Location

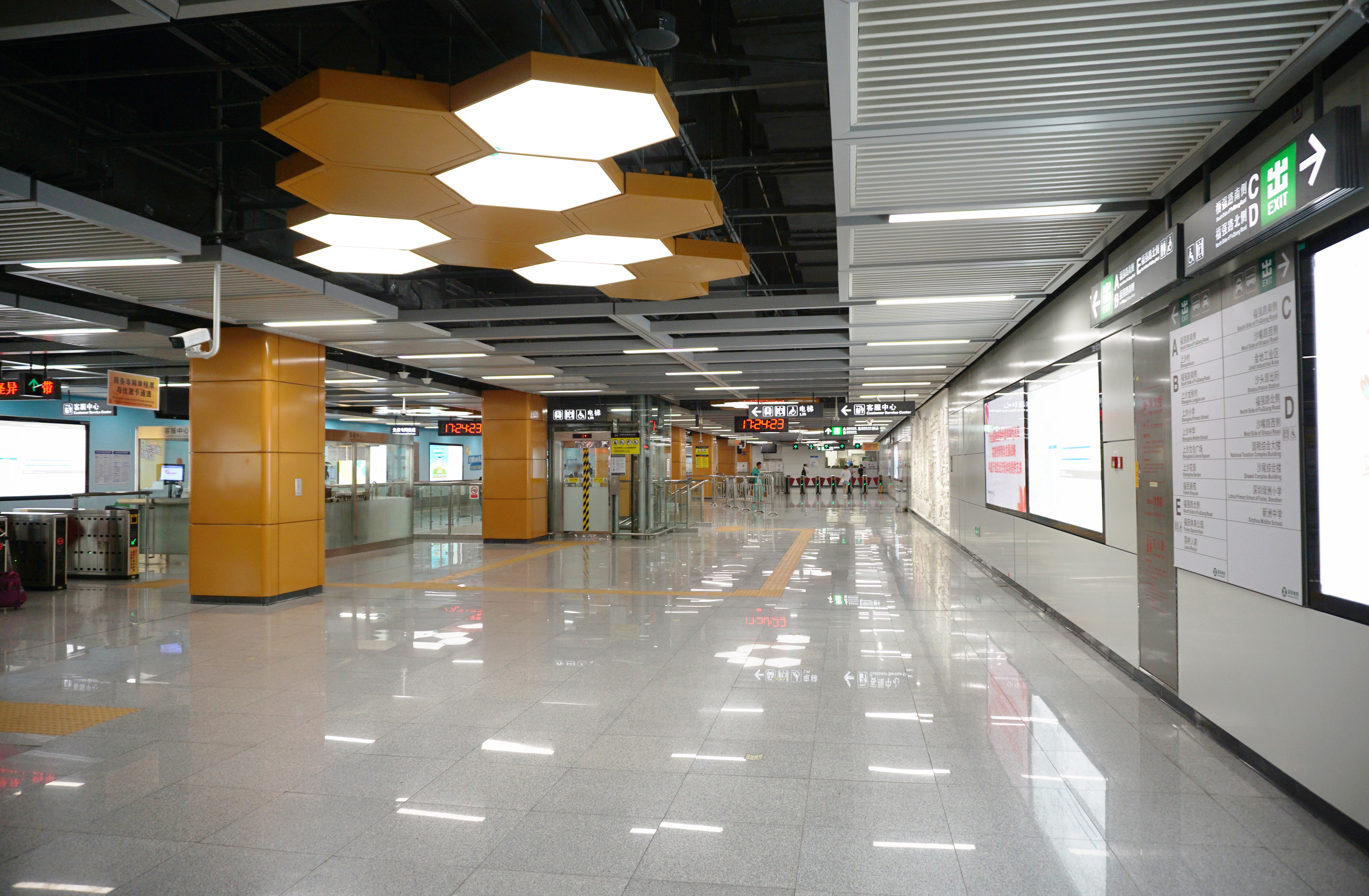
Concourse

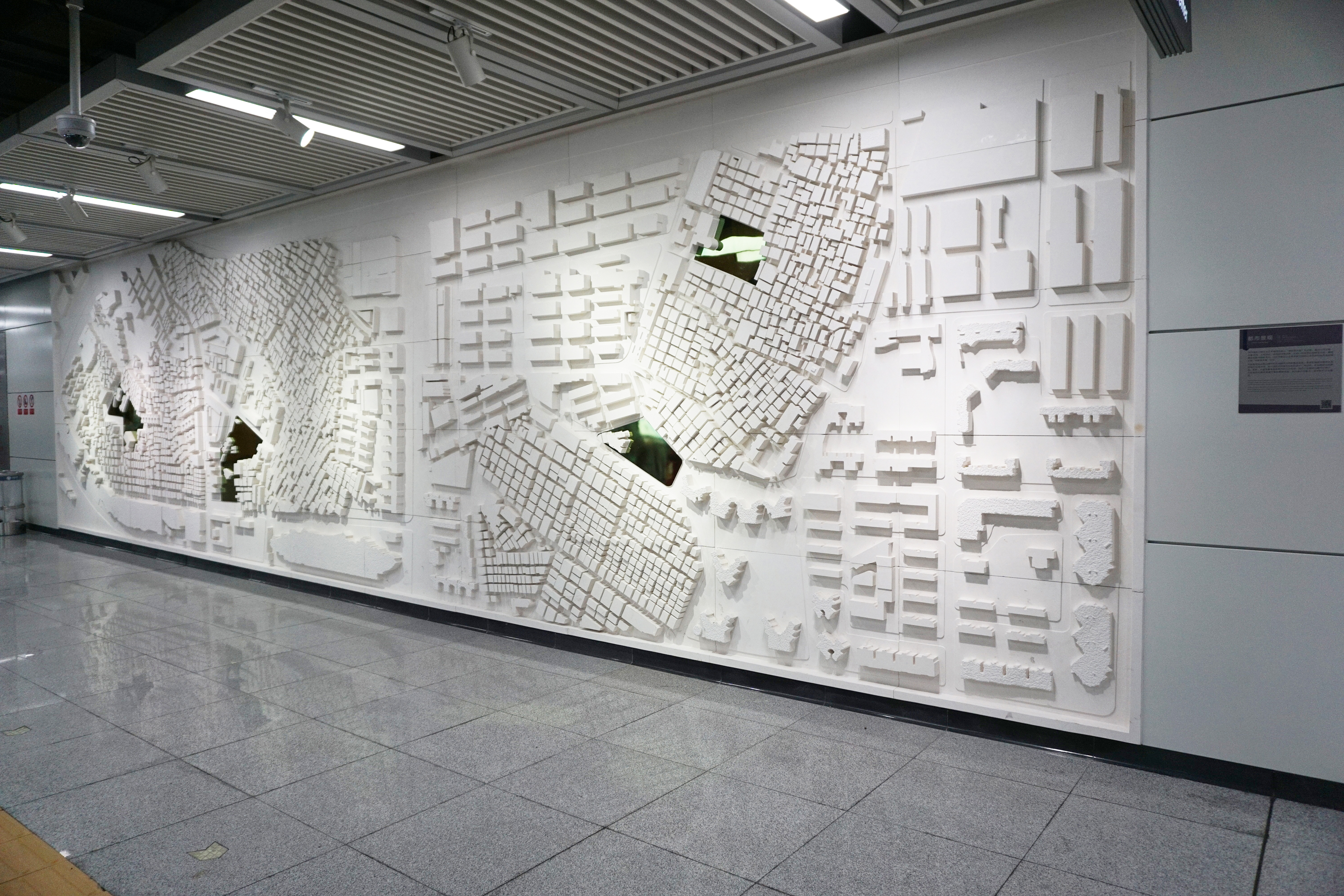
Art Wall - Urban Landscape

Shangsha station (Chinese: 上沙站; pinyin: Shàngshā Zhàn) is a station on Line 7 of the Shenzhen Metro. It opened on 28 October 2016.

== Station layout ==
| G | - | Exits A-E |
| B1F; Concourse | Lobby | Ticket Machines, Customer Service, Shops, Vending Machines |
| B2F; Platforms | Platform | 7 towards SZU Lihu Campus (Chegongmiao) |
| B2F; Platforms | Island platform, doors will open on the left |
| B2F; Platforms | Platform | 7 towards Tai'an (Shawei) |

== Exits ==
| Exit | Destination |
|---|---|
| Exit A | Fuqiang Road (S), Shangshacun |
| Exit B | Fuqiang Road (S), Shangsha Longqiucun, Shangsha Primary School, Shangsha Middle School, Shangsha Cultural Square, Shangsha Garden, Fumin Xinyuan |
| Exit C | Shazui Road (S), Jinhaiwan Garden, Jindi Industrial Area, Guifa Building, Shatou Police Station, Haojing Haoyuan, Jindi Garden |
| Exit D | Shazui Road (N), Yihe Building, Yeshu Garden, National Taxation Complex Building, Shawei Complex Building, Jinsha Garden, Jinshazui Building, Lvzhou Primary School, Xinzhou Middle School, Xiangjiang Xiyuan, Furuige, Yundong Homeland |
| Exit E | Futian Sports Park, Lishu Renjia |
