= Xikeng station =

Metro station in Shenzhen, Guangdong, China

Xikeng 茜坑
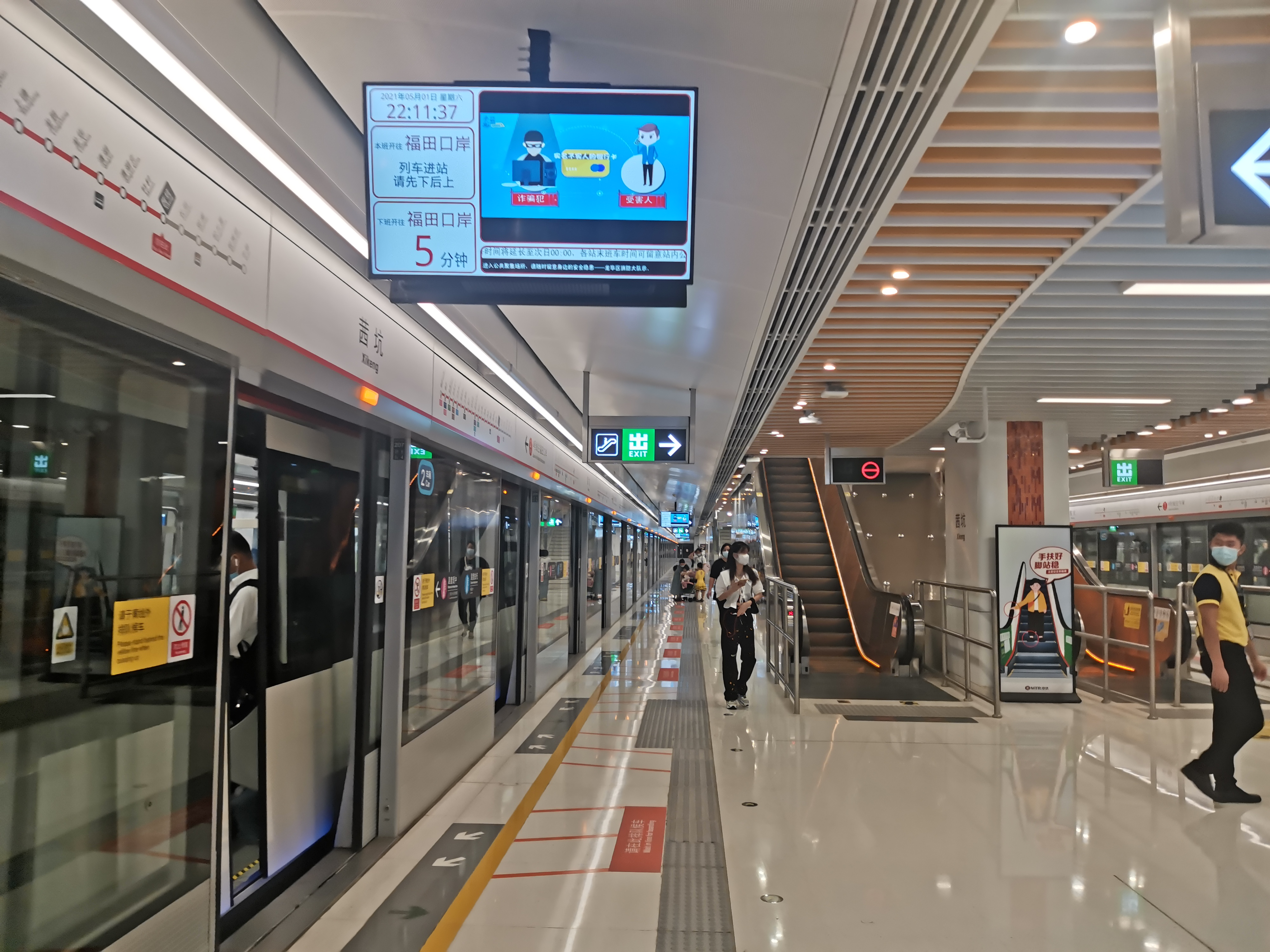
- Platform

General information
- Location: Longhua District, Shenzhen, Guangdong; China
- Coordinates: 22°39′50″N 114°2′11″E
- Operated by: MTR Corporation (Shenzhen)
- Line: Line 4
- Platforms: 2 (1 island platform)
- Tracks: 2

Construction
- Structure type: Underground
- Accessible: Yes

History
- Opened: 28 October 2020; 5 years ago

Services
Preceding station	Shenzhen Metro	Following station
Changhu towards Niuhu	Line 4	Zhucun towards Futian Checkpoint
Location

Xikeng station (Chinese: 茜坑站; pinyin: Xīkēng Zhàn) is a station on Line 4 of the Shenzhen Metro. It opened on 28 October 2020.

== Station layout ==
G	-	Exit
B1F; Concourse	Lobby	Customer Service, Shops, Vending machines, ATMs
B2F; Platforms	Platform 2	← Line 4 towards Futian Checkpoint (Zhucun)
B2F; Platforms	Island platform, doors will open on the left
B2F; Platforms	Platform 1	→ Line 4 towards Niuhu (Changhu) →

== Exits ==
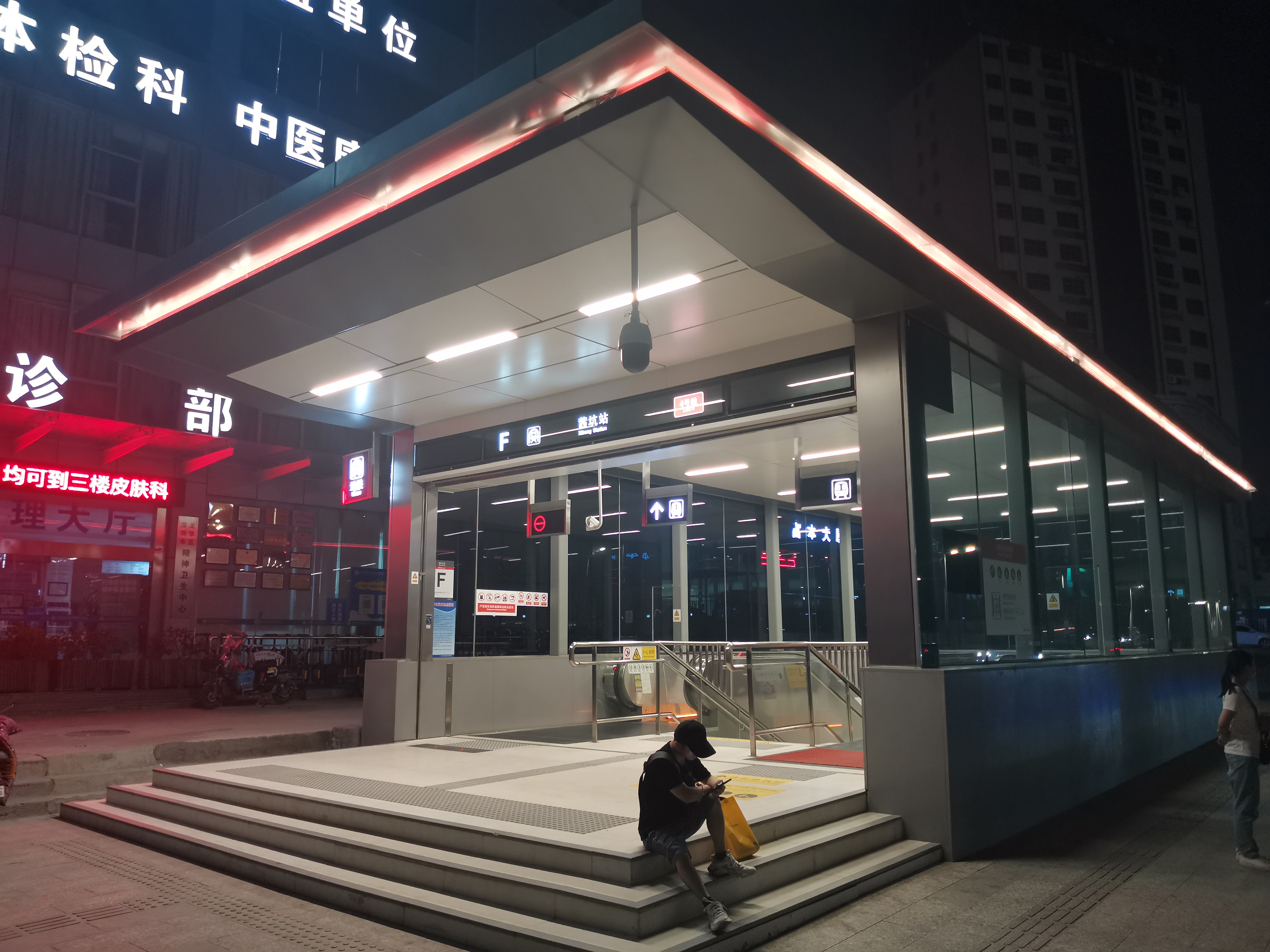
Exit F

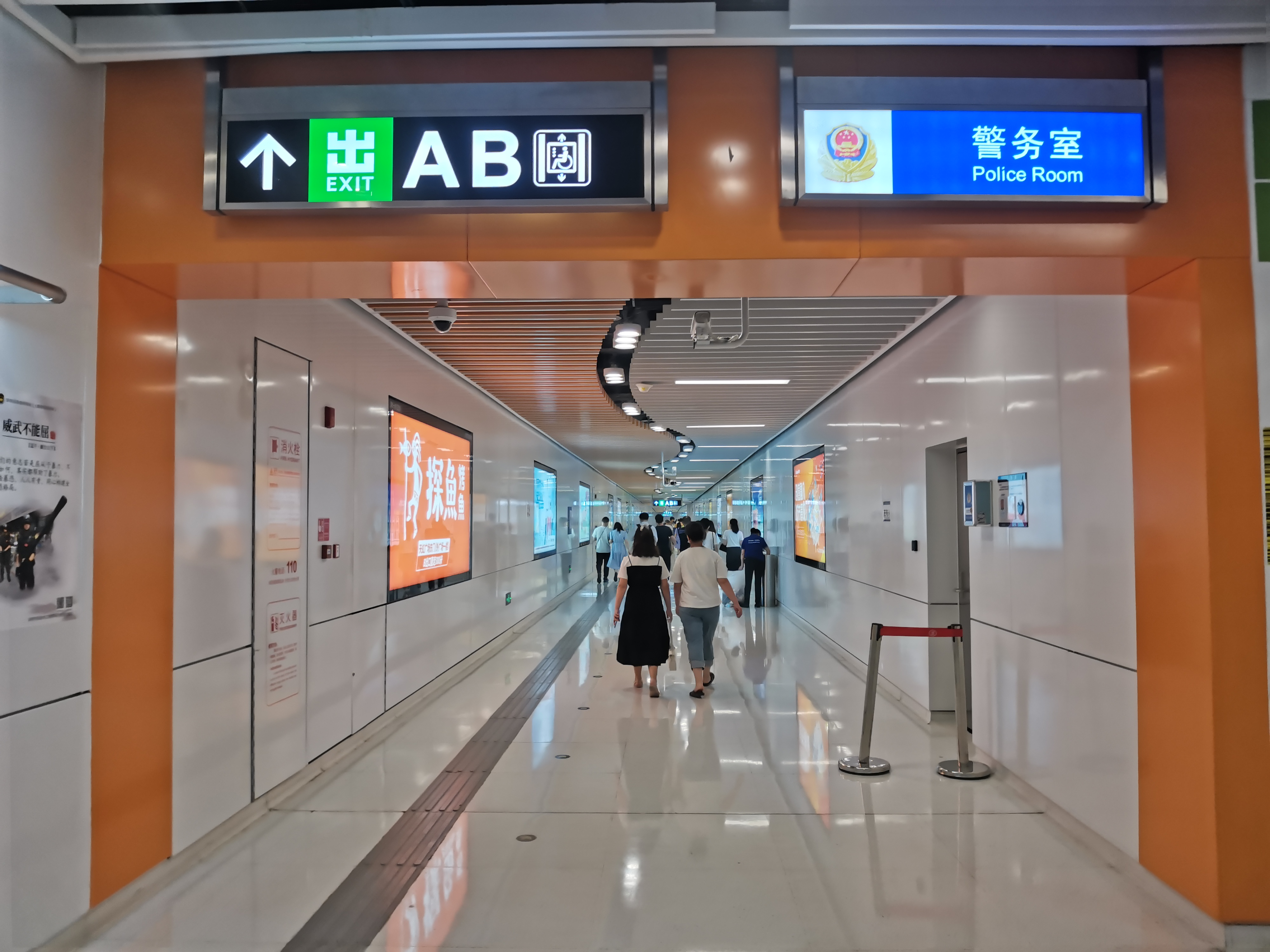
Way to Exit A & B

Exit	Destination
Exit A	
Exit B	
Exit C	Guanlan Squadron Longhua Traffic Police Brigade, Longguangjiu Yufu,
Exit D	Wencheng School, Spoondrift Kindergarten, Tianbei Yicun
Exit E	Zhiyulanwan Garden, Xianghe Mountain Villa, Xianglan Court, Longhua District Government, Guanlan Working Committee of the Chinese Communist Party
Exit F	Longhua District Chronic Disease Prevention Center

== Gallery ==
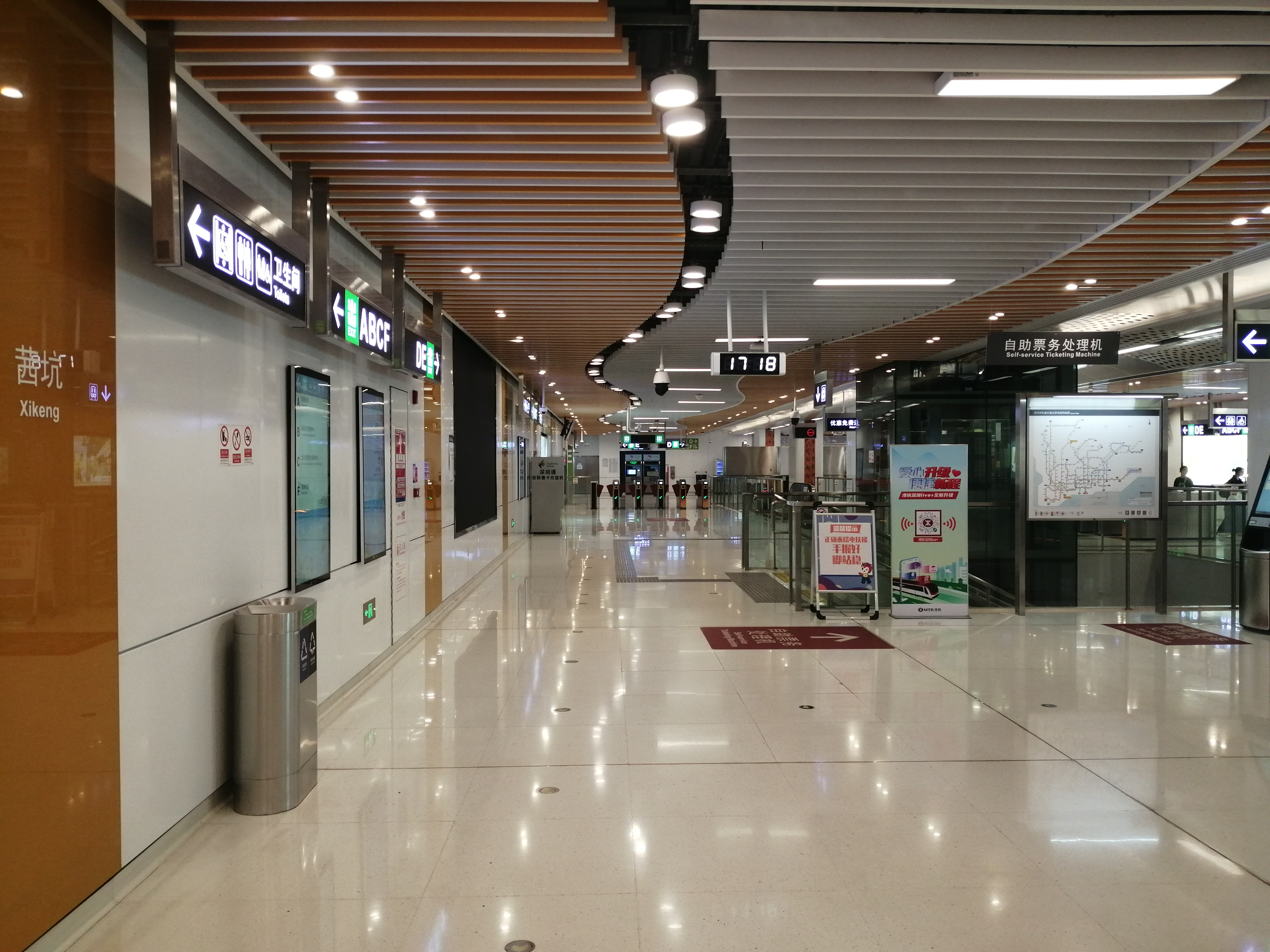
Concourse
