= Songyuanxia station =

Metro station in Shenzhen, China

Songyuanxia 松元厦
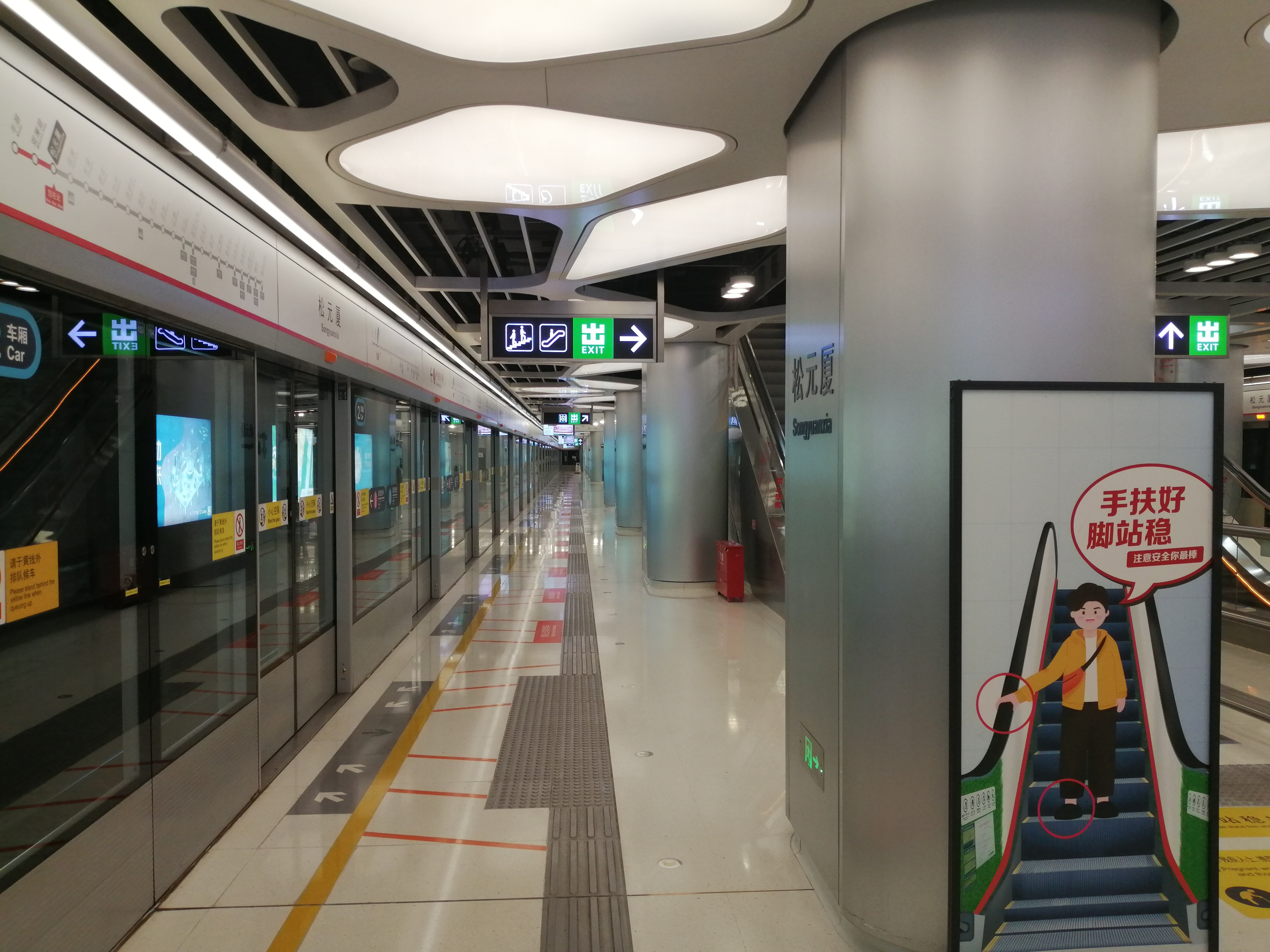
- Platform

General information
- Location: Longhua District, Shenzhen, Guangdong; China
- Coordinates: 22°39′50″N 114°2′11″E
- Operated by: MTR Corporation (Shenzhen)
- Line: Line 4
- Platforms: 2 (1 island platform)
- Tracks: 2

Construction
- Structure type: Underground
- Accessible: Yes

History
- Opened: 28 October 2020; 5 years ago

Services
Preceding station	Shenzhen Metro	Following station
Mission Hills towards Niuhu	Line 4	Guanlan towards Futian Checkpoint
Location

Songyuanxia station (Chinese: 松元厦站; pinyin: Sōngyuánxià Zhàn) is a station on Line 4 of the Shenzhen Metro. It opened on 28 October 2020.

== Station layout ==
G	-	Exit
B1F; Concourse	Lobby	Customer Service, Shops, Vending machines, ATMs
B2F; Platforms	Platform 2	← Line 4 towards Futian Checkpoint (Guanlan)
B2F; Platforms	Island platform, doors will open on the left
B2F; Platforms	Platform 1	→ Line 4 towards Niuhu (Mission Hills) →

== Exits ==
Exit		Destination
Exit A	A1	Auxiliary Police Squadron
Exit A	A2	Songyuan Police Station, Songyuanxia Community Park
Exit B		Songyuanxia Community Park
Exit C		Reserved
Exit D	D1	Gangtou Community Health Service Centre, Guilan Xincun
Exit D	D2	
Exit E	E1	Ledujuan Kindergarten, Chenwu Xincun, Gangtoucun, Dongwangcun, Zhengxinglou, Taoyuanyihao, Xumei Xincun, Dabu Xincun
Exit E	E2	Xiangxixinweicun, Zhengxinglou, Taoyuanyihao, Xumei Xincun, Guanlan Sub-district Office, Guanlan Bus Station

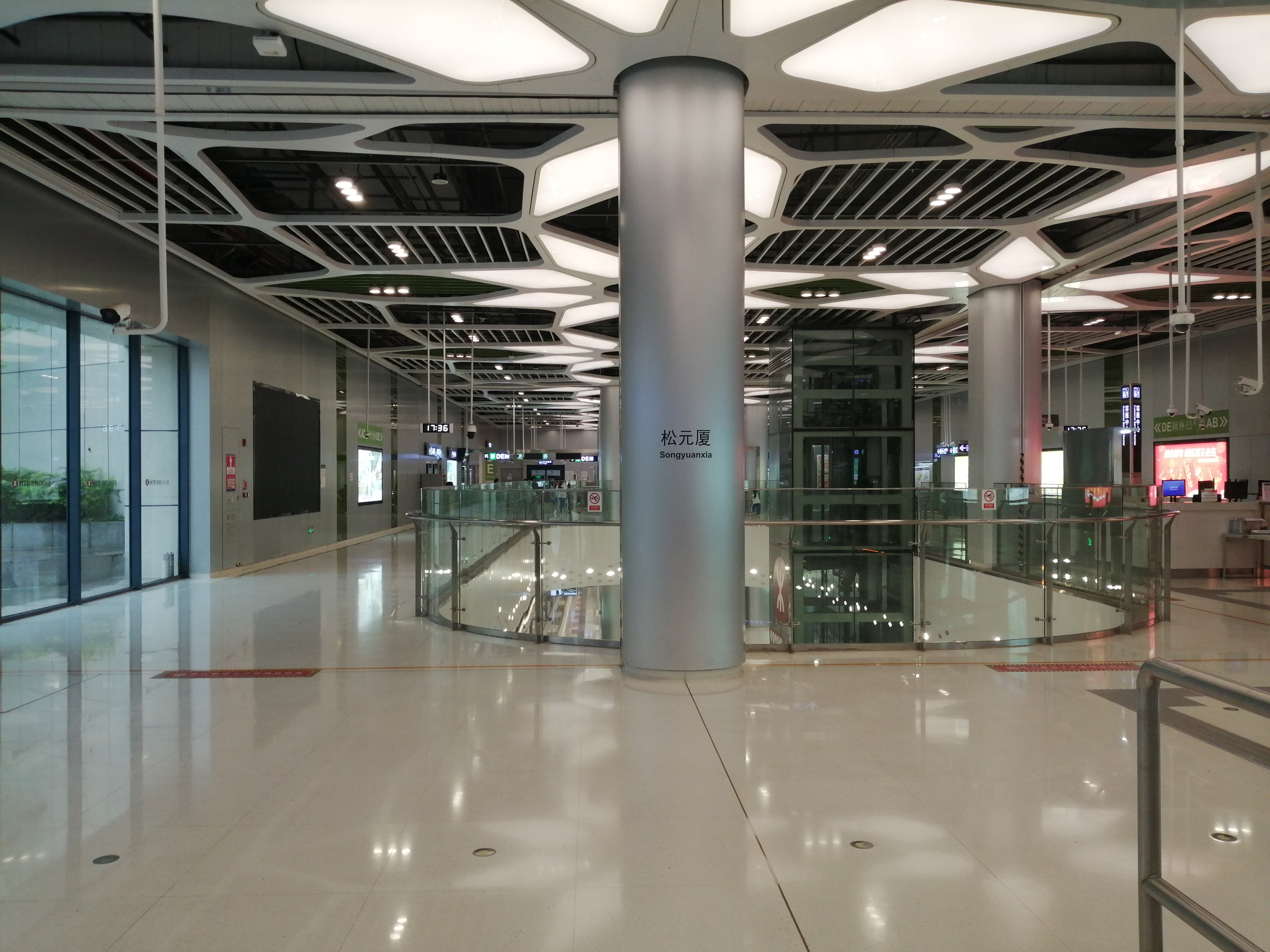
Concourse

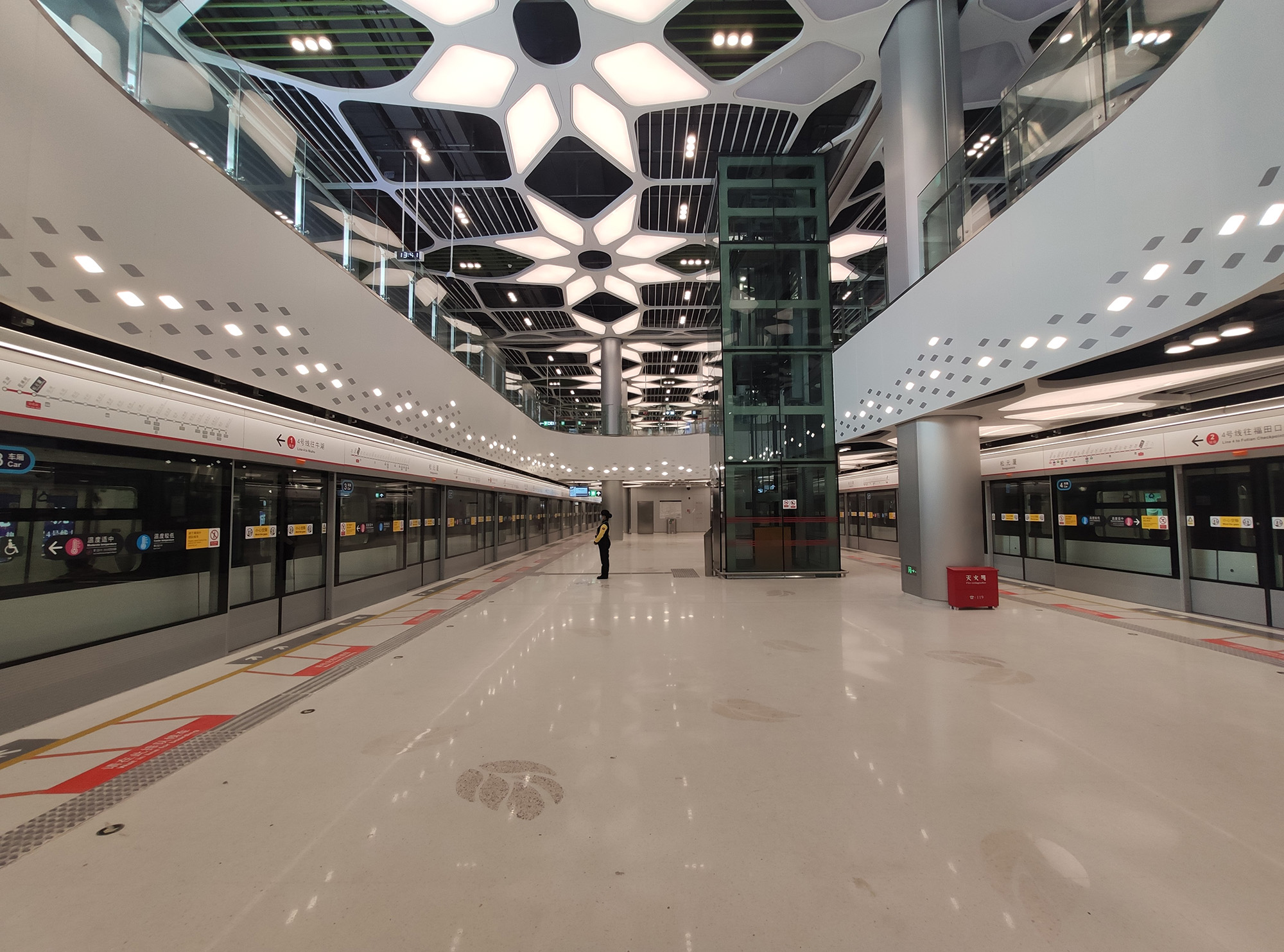
Platform
