= Qinghu North station =

Metro station in Shenzhen, Guangdong, China

Qinghu North 清湖北
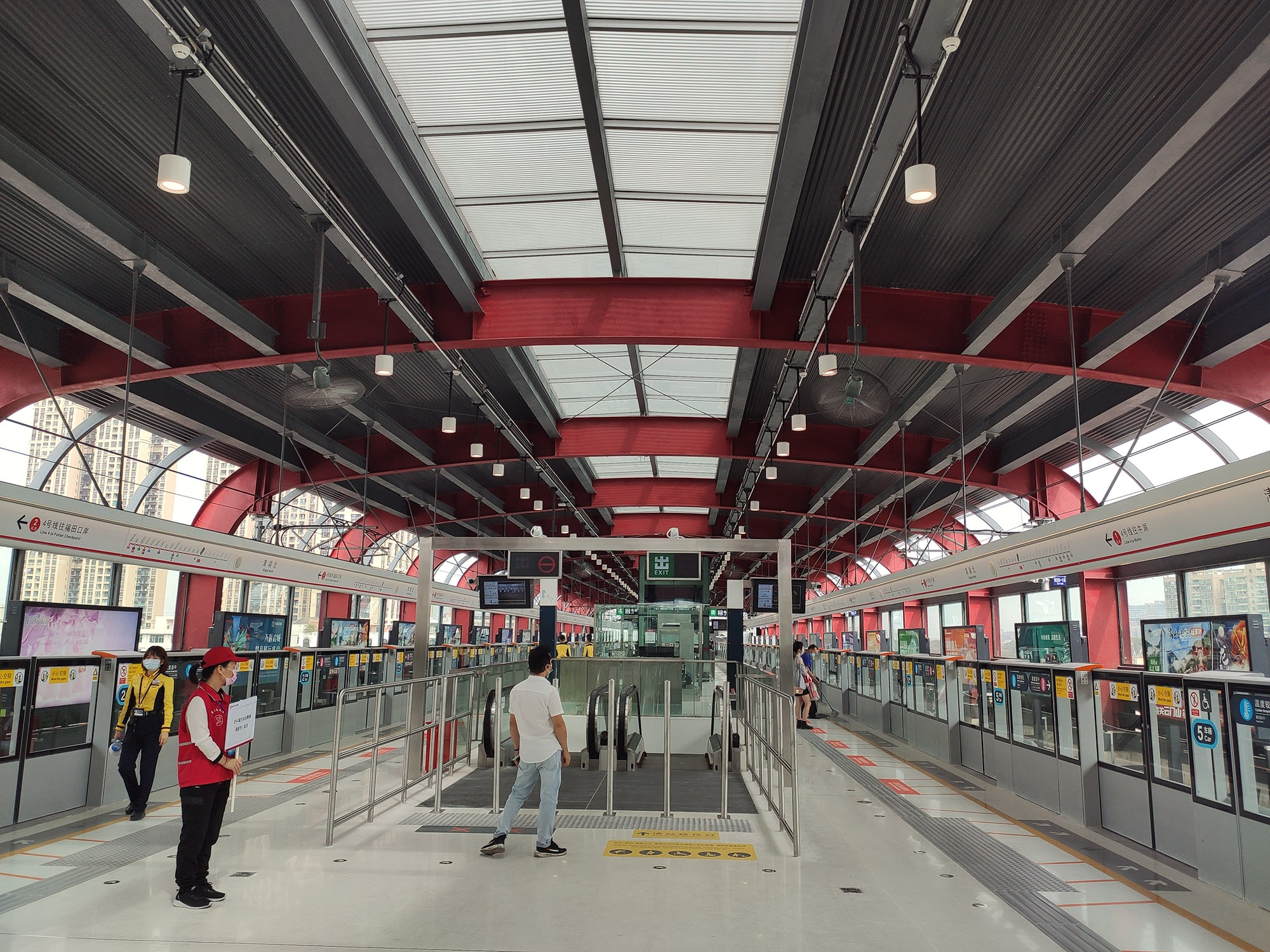
- Platform in 2020

General information
- Location: Longhua District, Shenzhen, Guangdong; China
- Coordinates: 22°39′50″N 114°2′11″E
- Operated by: MTR Corporation (Shenzhen)
- Line: Line 4
- Platforms: 2 (1 island platform)
- Tracks: 2

Construction
- Structure type: Elevated
- Accessible: Yes

History
- Opened: 28 October 2020; 5 years ago

Services
Preceding station	Shenzhen Metro	Following station
Zhucun towards Niuhu	Line 4	Qinghu towards Futian Checkpoint
Location

Qinghu North station (Chinese: 清湖北站; pinyin: Qīnghú Běi Zhàn; Jyutping: Cing1 Wu4 Bak1 Zaam6) is a station on Line 4 of the Shenzhen Metro. It opened on 28 October 2020.

== Station layout ==
3F; Platforms	Platform 2	← Line 4 towards Futian Checkpoint (Qinghu)
3F; Platforms	Island platform, doors will open on the left
3F; Platforms	Platform 1	→ Line 4 towards Niuhu (Zhucun) →
2F; Concourse	Lobby	Customer Service, Shops, Vending machines, ATMs
G	-	Exit

== Exits ==
Exit	Destination
Exit A	Qinghu Kindergarten, Qinghu Primary School, Longhua District City Authority
Exit B	Tianji Mansion, Baohu Kindergarten
Exit C	Jinhuayayuan, Jinfenghuanghaoyuan, Xinbeicun, Baohu Xincun
Exit D	Qinghucun

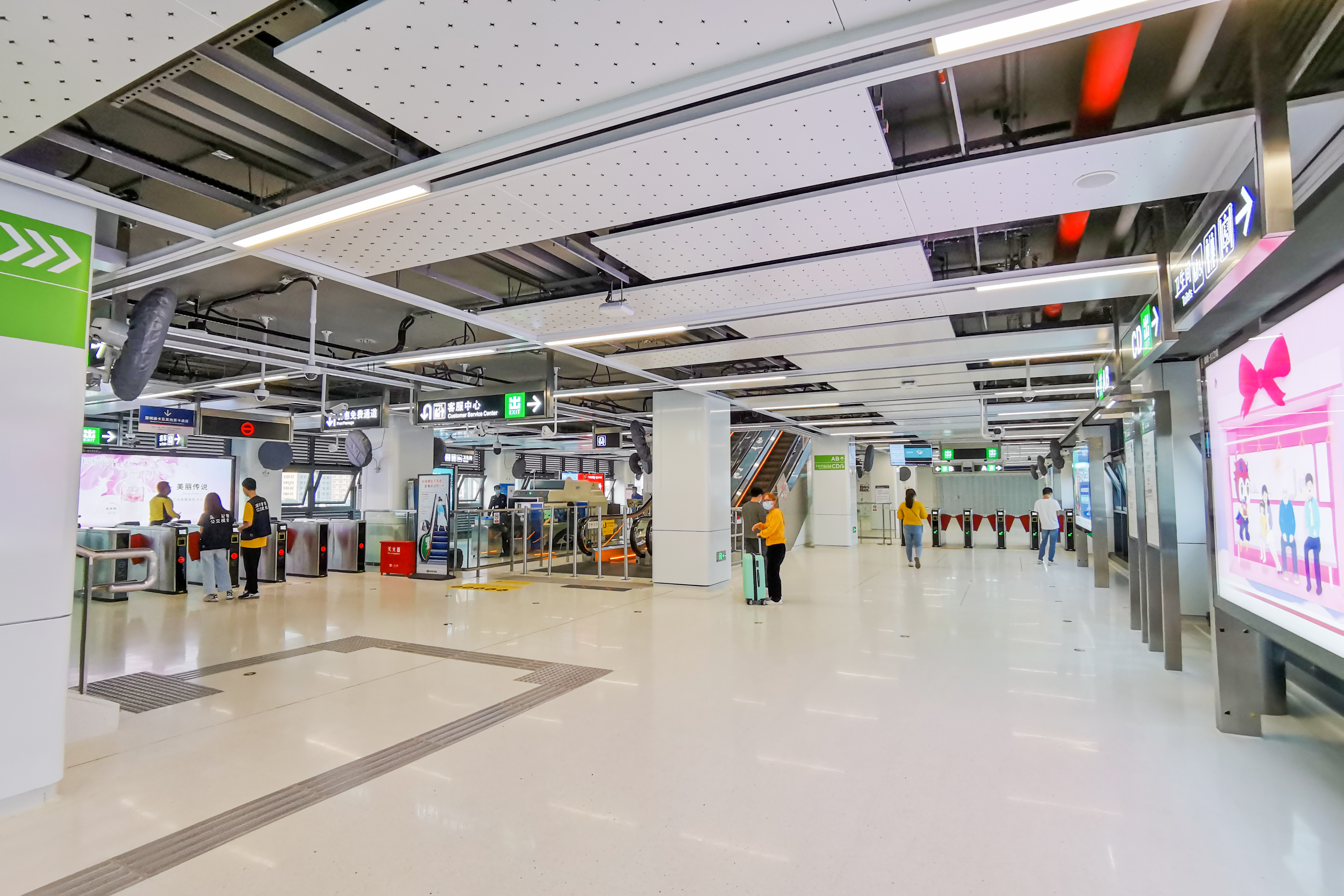
Concourse in 2020

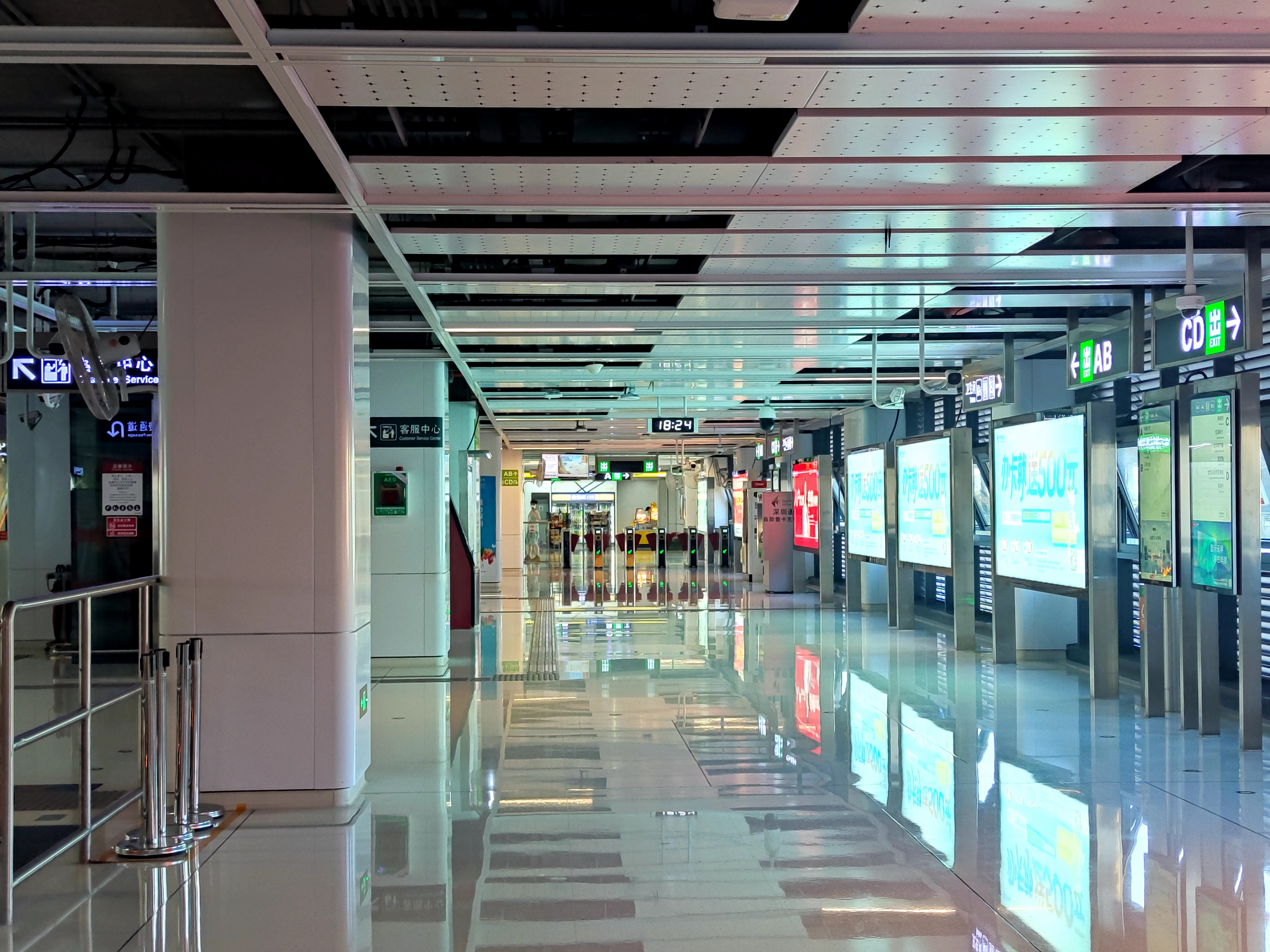
Concourse in 2022

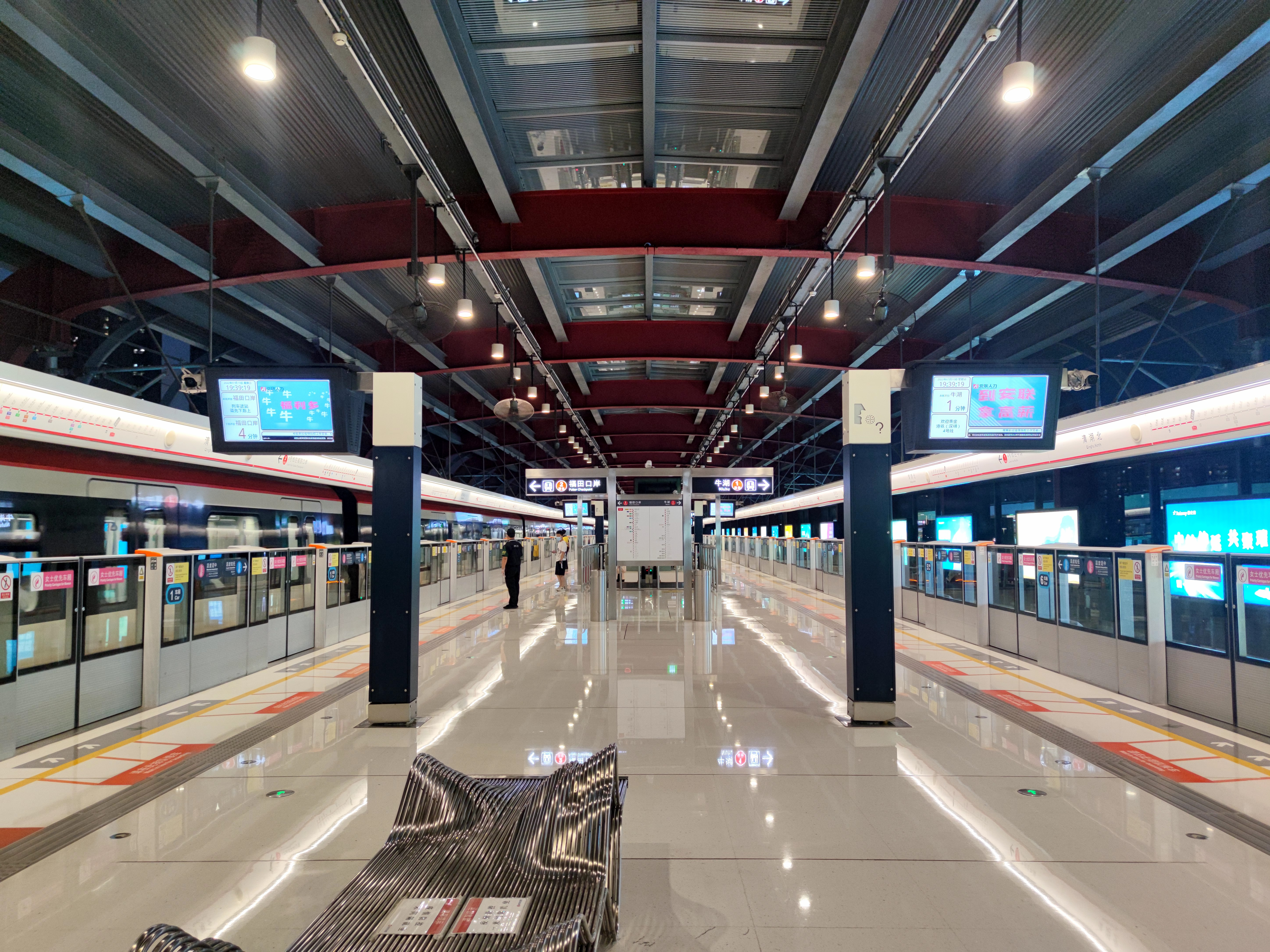
Platform in 2022

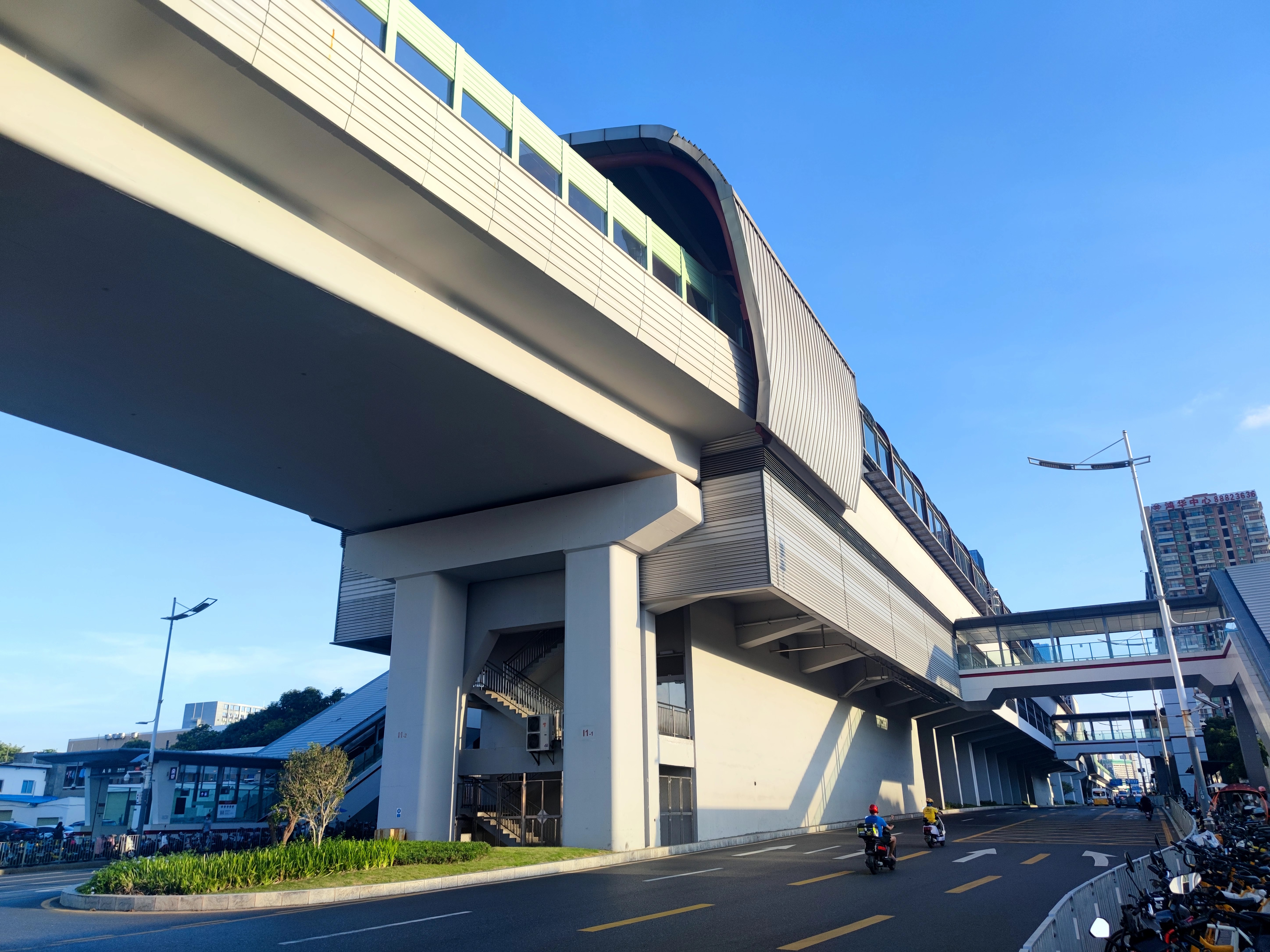
Exterior (July 2022)
