= Guanlan station =

Metro station in Shenzhen, Guangdong, China

Guanlan 观澜
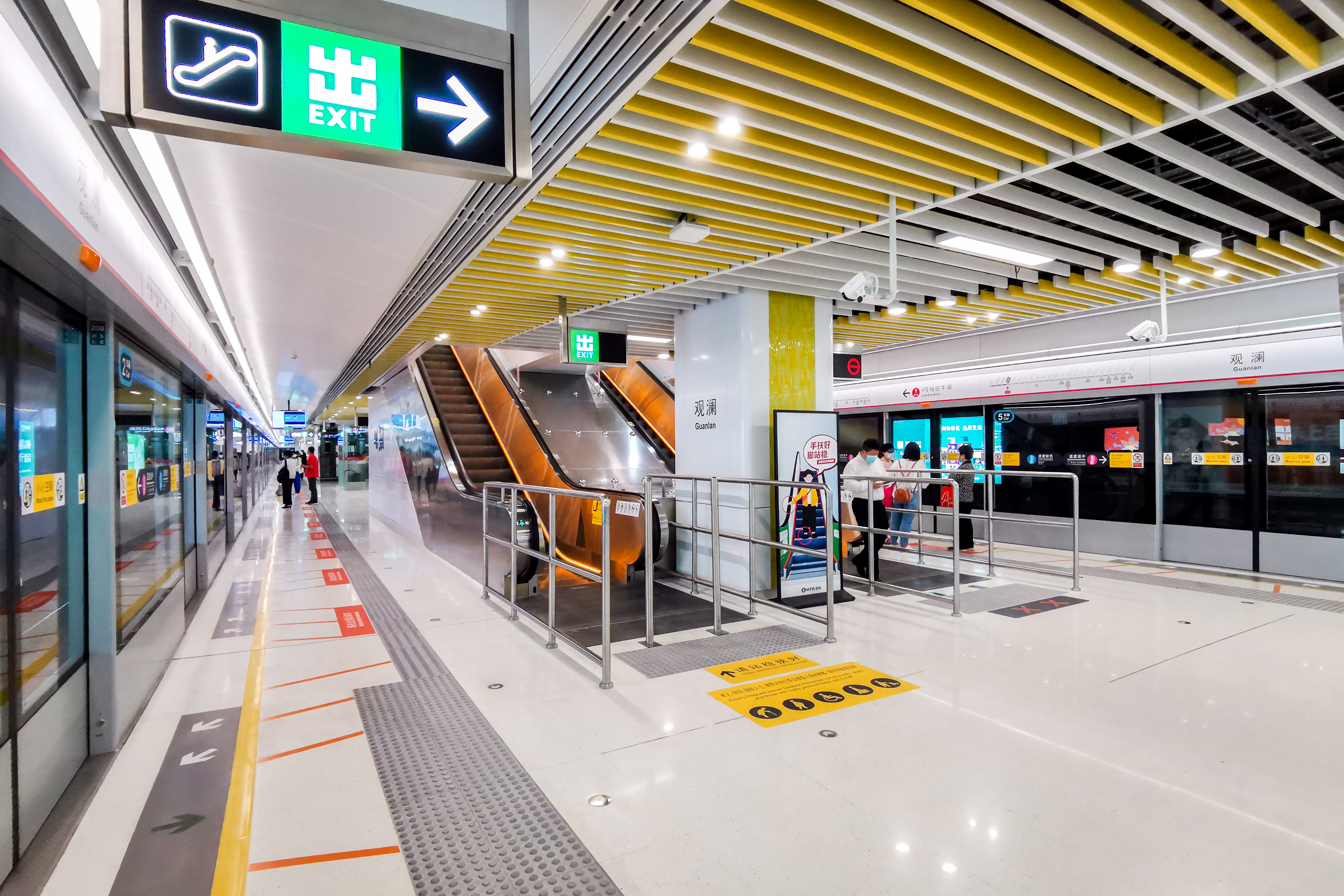
- Platform

General information
- Location: Longhua District, Shenzhen, Guangdong; China
- Coordinates: 22°39′50″N 114°2′11″E
- Operated by: MTR Corporation (Shenzhen)
- Line: Line 4
- Platforms: 2 (1 island platform)
- Tracks: 2

Construction
- Structure type: Underground
- Accessible: Yes

History
- Opened: 28 October 2020; 5 years ago

Services
Preceding station	Shenzhen Metro	Following station
Songyuanxia towards Niuhu	Line 4	Changhu towards Futian Checkpoint
Location

Guanlan station (Chinese: 观澜站; pinyin: Guānlán Zhàn) is a station on Line 4 of the Shenzhen Metro. It opened on 28 October 2020.

== Station layout ==
G	-	Exit
B1F; Concourse	Lobby	Customer service, shops, vending machines, ATMs
B2F; Platforms	Platform 2	← Line 4 towards Futian Checkpoint (Changhu)
B2F; Platforms	Island platform, doors will open on the left
B2F; Platforms	Platform 1	→ Line 4 towards Niuhu (Songyuanxia) →

== Exits ==
Exit	Destination
Exit A	Chenwuwei, Shenyetairan Guanlanmeiguiyuan
Exit B	Guanlan Zhongxin Primary School, Huayuan
Exit C	Guanlan Xinlan Kindergarten, Xinweiao, Chunhuiluo, Xia'ecun, Cuilan Community, Zhonggong Xinlan Community, Guanlan Police Station, Guanlan Laojie Park
Exit D	Malidongqu, Mali Community Park
Exit E	Jiahualingyu Plaza, Longhua Tram Xinlan Station

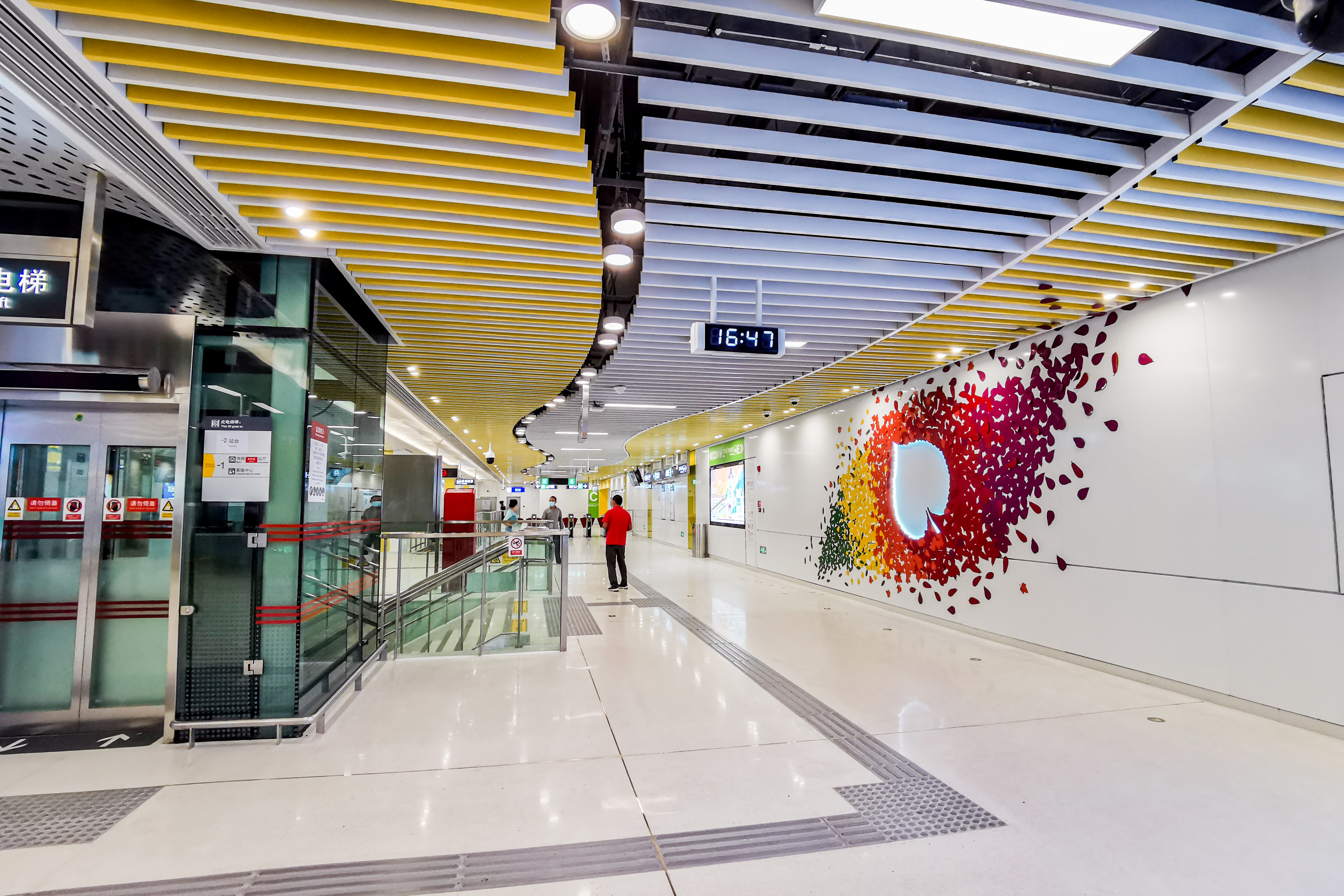
Concourse

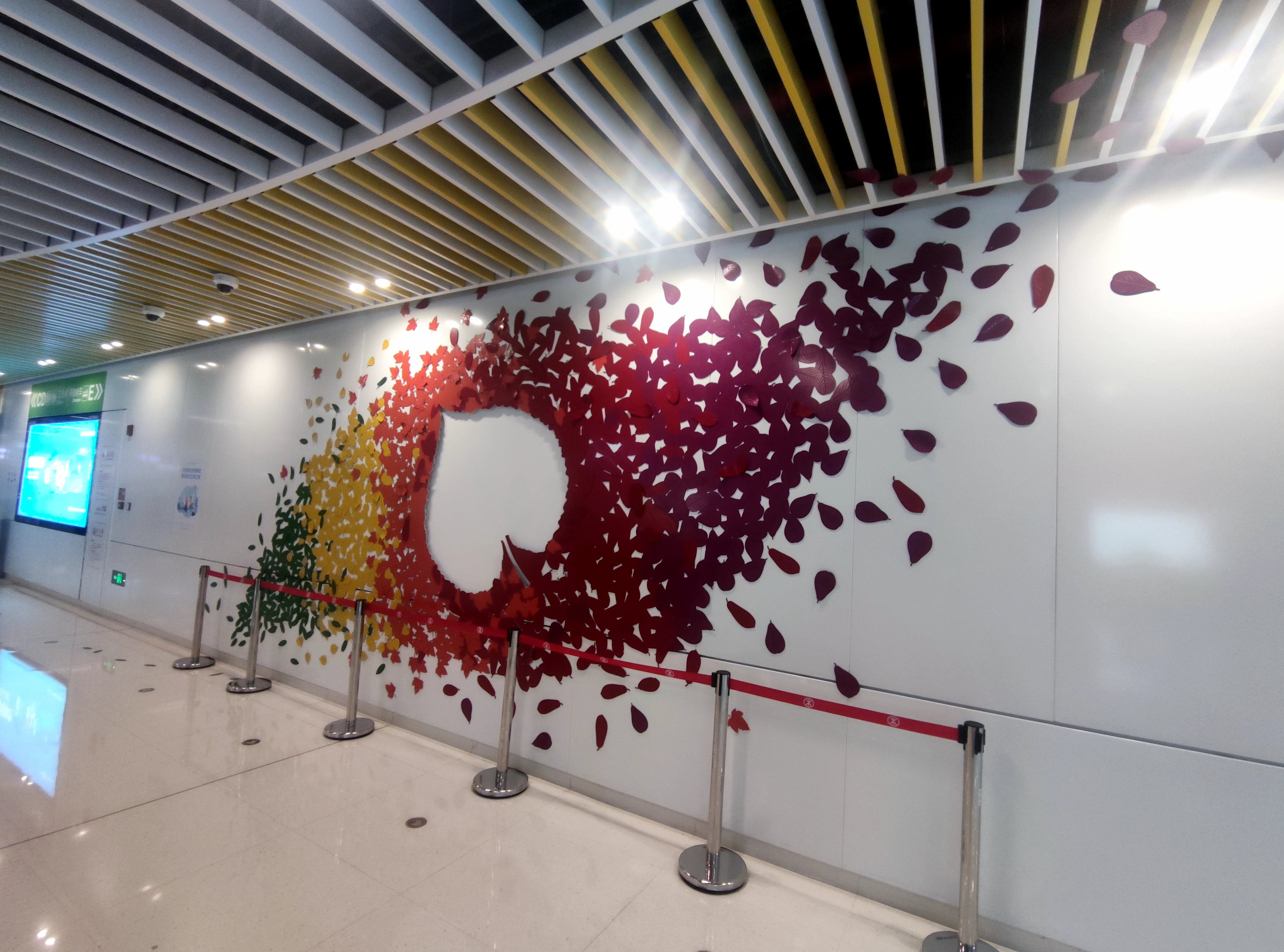
Station art
