= Changhu station =

Metro station in Shenzhen, China

Changhu 长湖
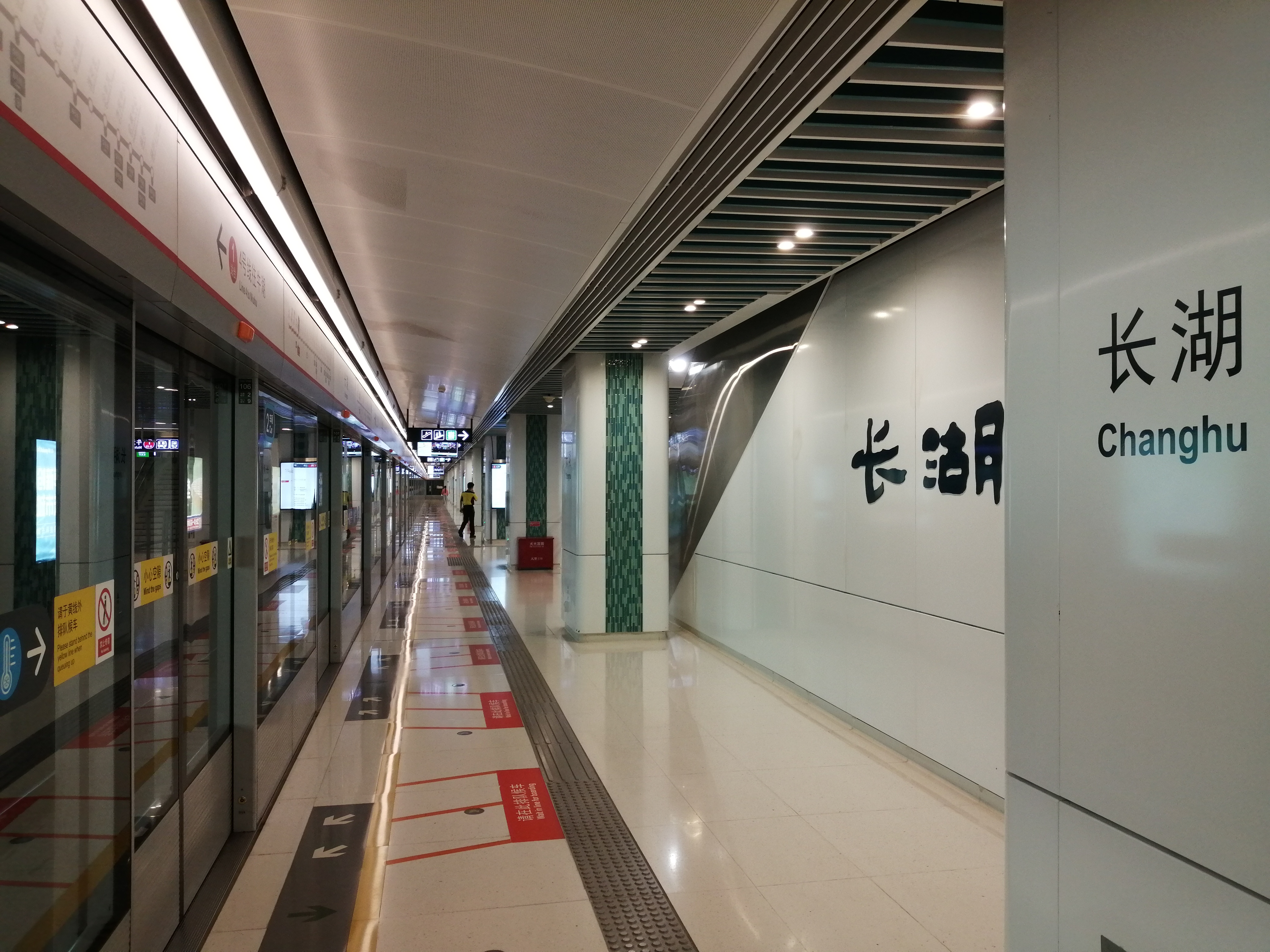
- Platform

General information
- Location: Longhua District, Shenzhen, Guangdong; China
- Coordinates: 22°39′50″N 114°2′11″E
- Operated by: MTR Corporation (Shenzhen)
- Line: Line 4
- Platforms: 2 (1 island platform)
- Tracks: 2

Construction
- Structure type: Underground
- Accessible: Yes

History
- Opened: 28 October 2020; 5 years ago

Services
Preceding station	Shenzhen Metro	Following station
Guanlan towards Niuhu	Line 4	Xikeng towards Futian Checkpoint
Location

Changhu station (Chinese: 长湖站; pinyin: Chánghú Zhàn) is a station on Line 4 of the Shenzhen Metro. It opened on 28 October 2020.

== Station layout ==
G	-	Exit
B1F; Concourse	Lobby	Customer Service, Shops, Vending machines, ATMs
B2F; Platforms	Platform 2	← Line 4 towards Futian Checkpoint (Xikeng)
B2F; Platforms	Island platform, doors will open on the left
B2F; Platforms	Platform 1	→ Line 4 towards Niuhu (Guanlan) →

== Exits ==
Exit		Destination
Exit A		Yingqiao Garden, Binhe Garden
Exit B		Haoyuan Kindergarten, Longhua District Central Hospital, Songyuanwei, Malixi Xincun, Dahe Wuqu Xincun, Malilaoyicun
Exit C		Huasheng Guanhui Kindergarten, Fucheng Branch of Longhua District Health Supervision Institute, Shenzhen Weiguang Hospital, Dankengxiqu, Dankeng Xincun, Huashengguanhuimingting
Exit D		Longhua District Taxation Office Fucheng Taxation Office, Changhutou Xincun
Exit E	E1	Huashengguanhuimingting, Jiangwei Xincun
Exit E	E2	Yinhe Xincun

== Gallery ==
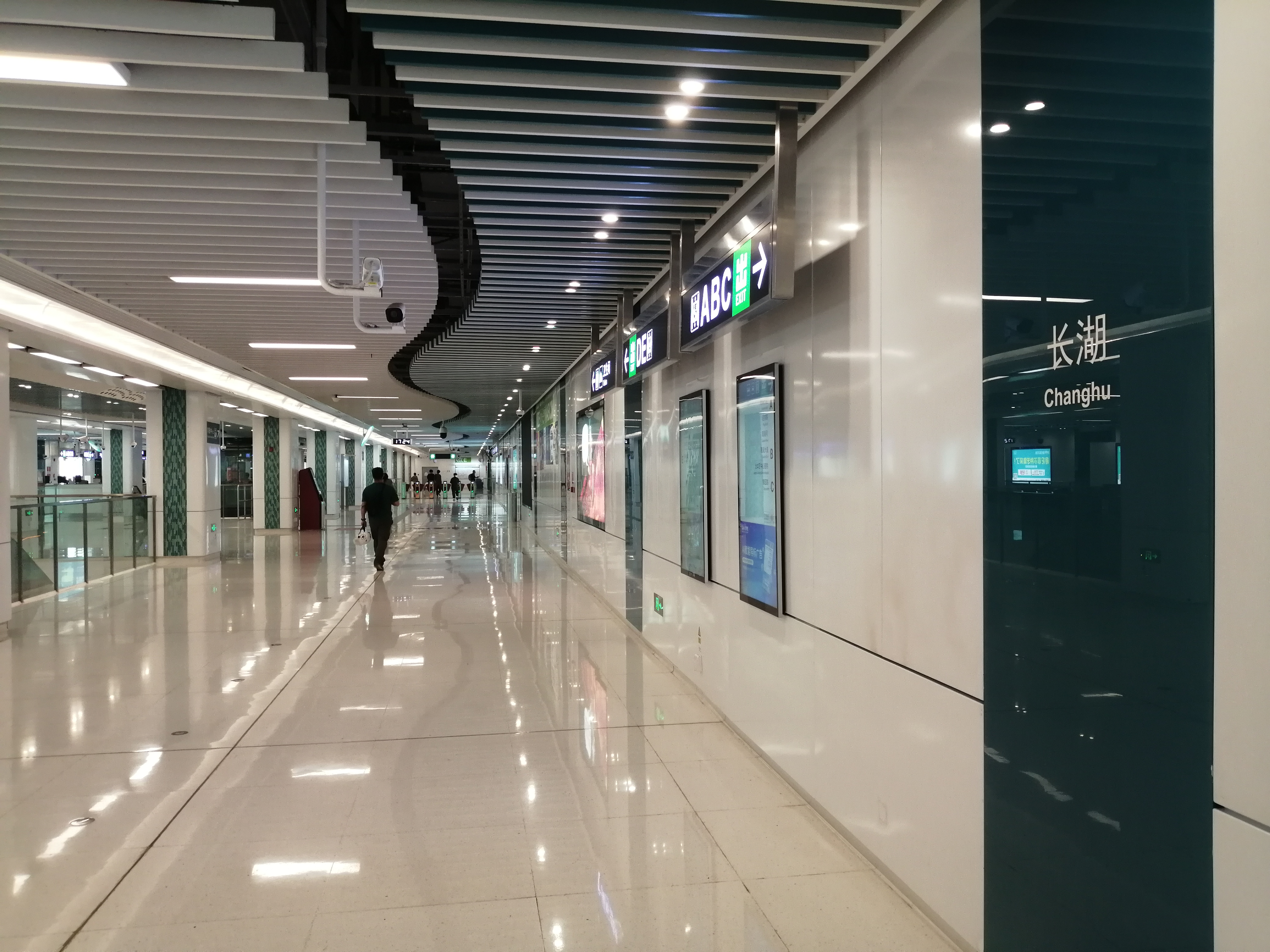
Concourse

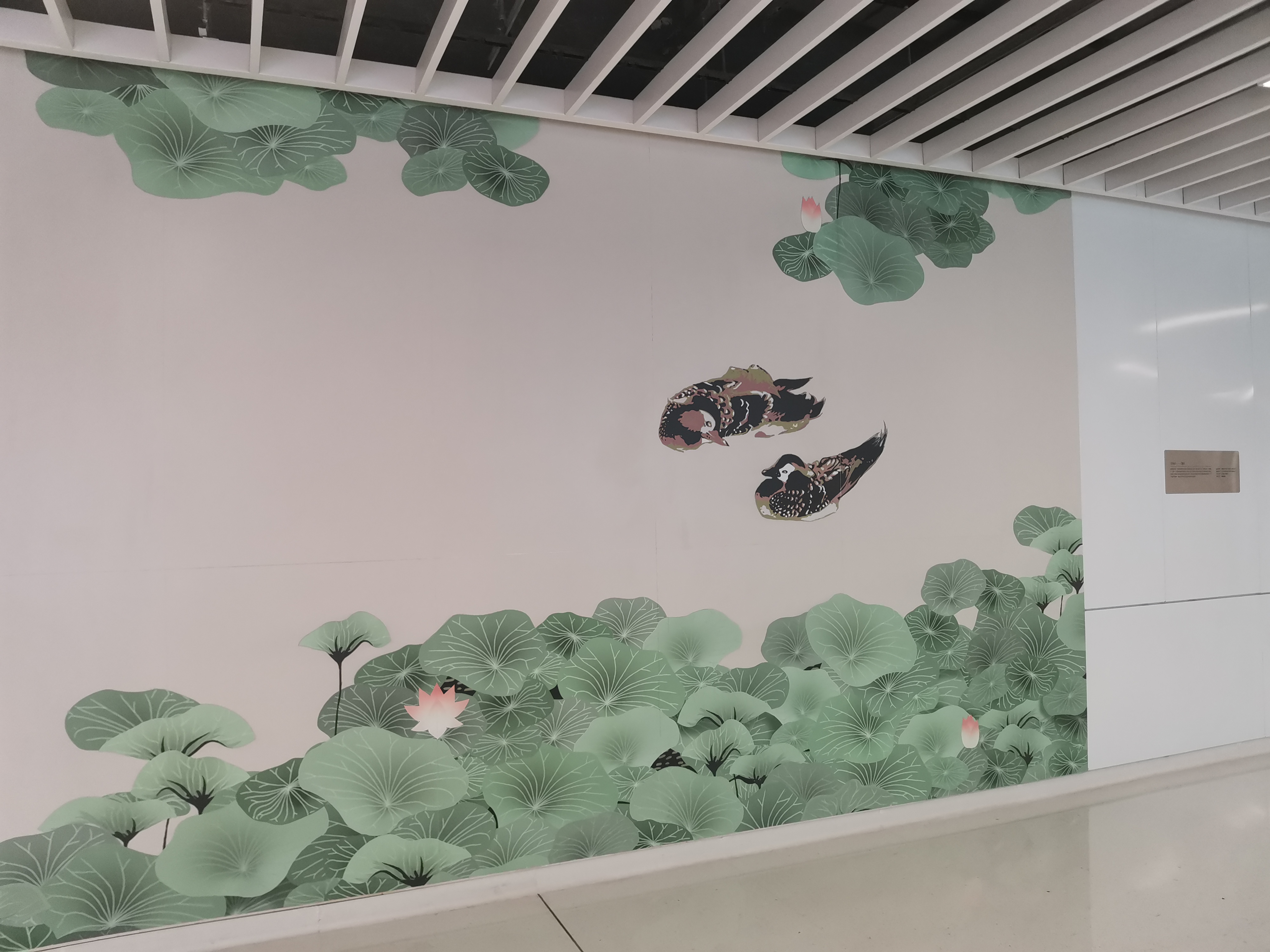
Art wall 1

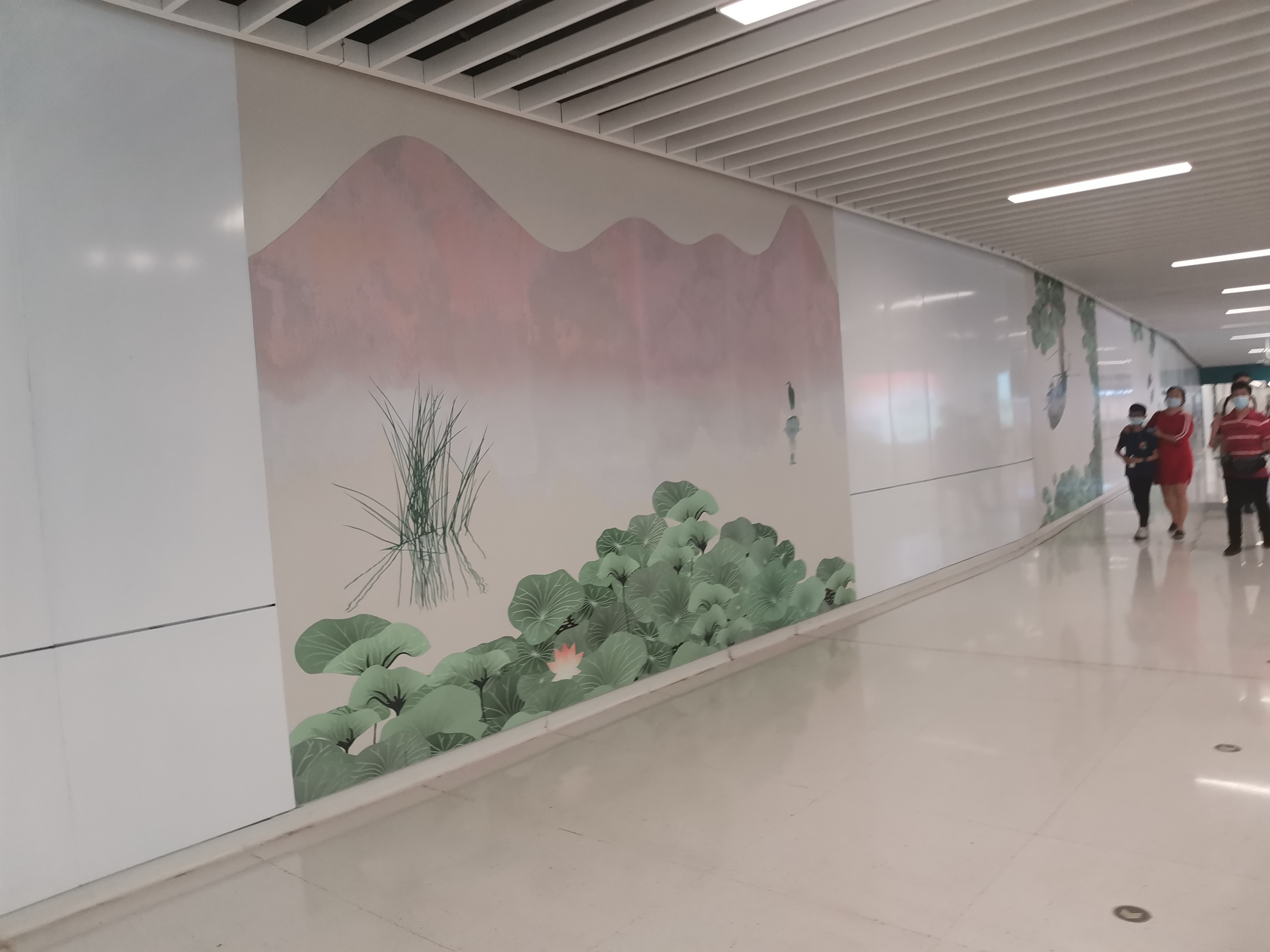
Art wall 2

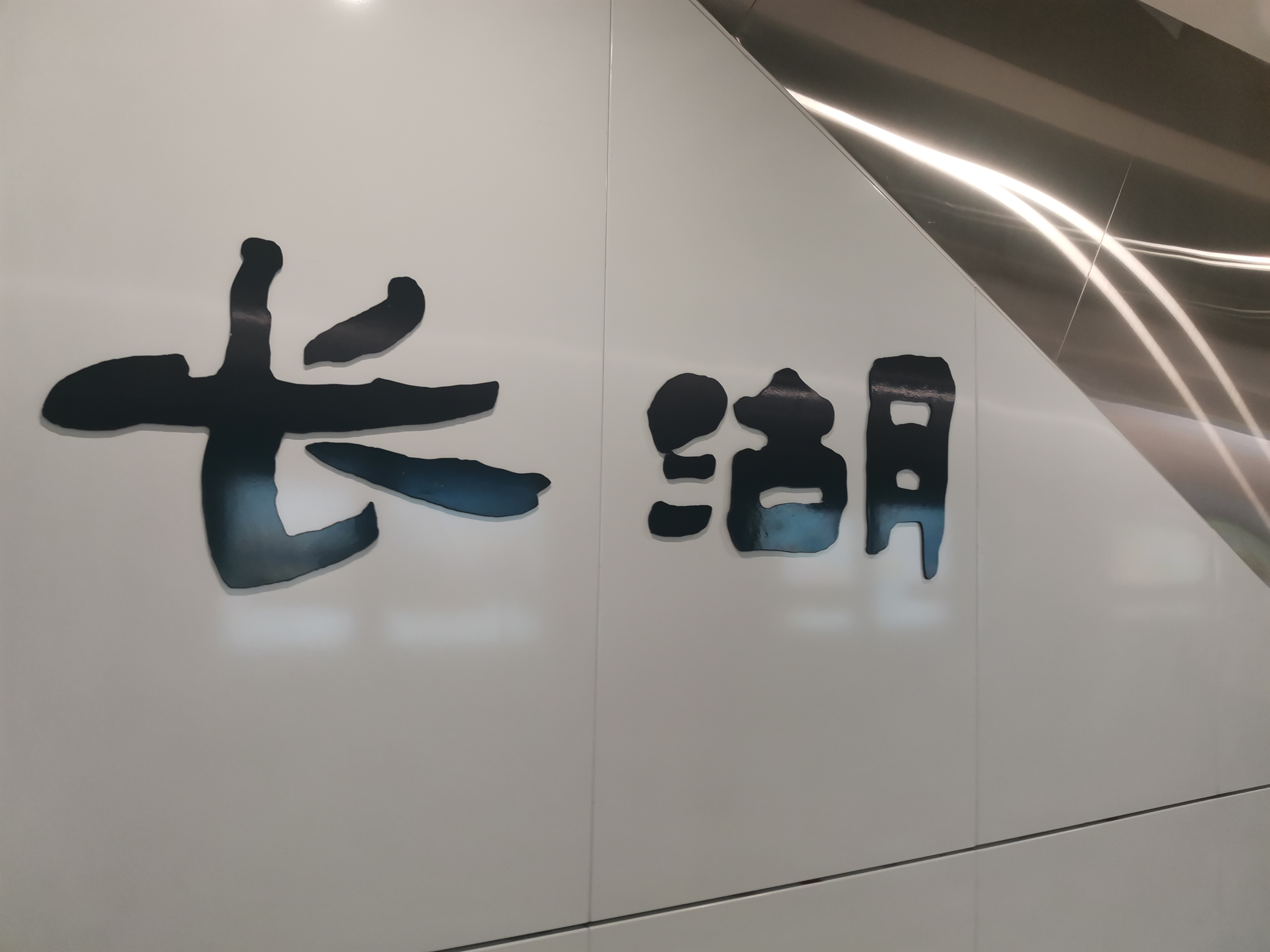
Calligraphy

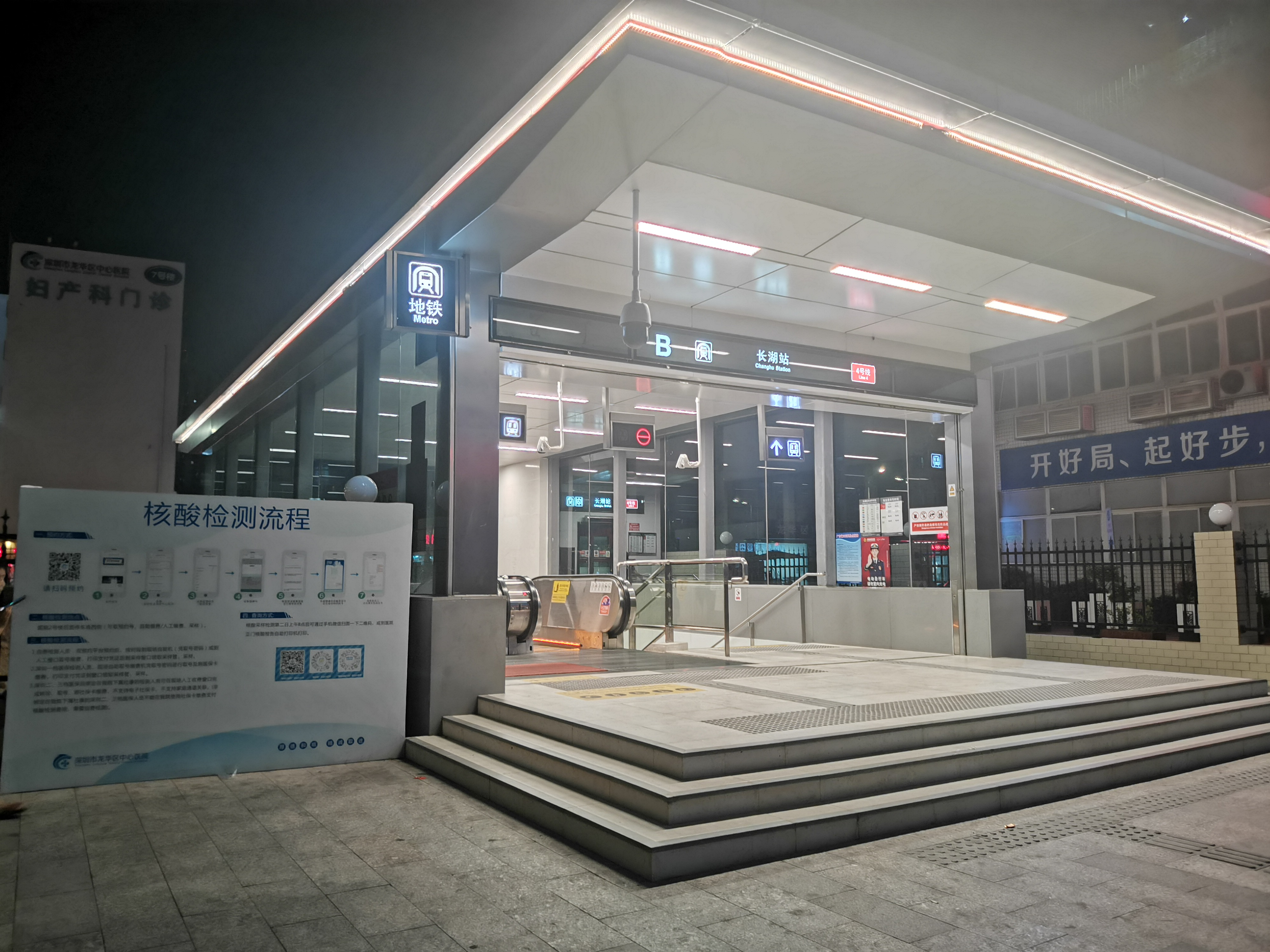
Exit B
