= Zhucun station =

Zhucun station may refer to:

- Zhucun station (Shenzhen Metro), a station on Shenzhen Metro Line 4
- Zhucun station (Guangzhou Metro), a station on Guangzhou Metro Line 21
- Tianhe Zhucun station, a station on Guangzhou Metro Line 13
- Zhucun station (Xi'an Metro), a station on Xi'an Metro Line 15.
- Zhucun station (Xi'an Skyshuttle), a station on the Xi'an Skyshuttle that is connected to the Xi'an Metro station.
