= Mission Hills station =

Metro station in Shenzhen, Guangdong, China

Mission Hills 观澜湖
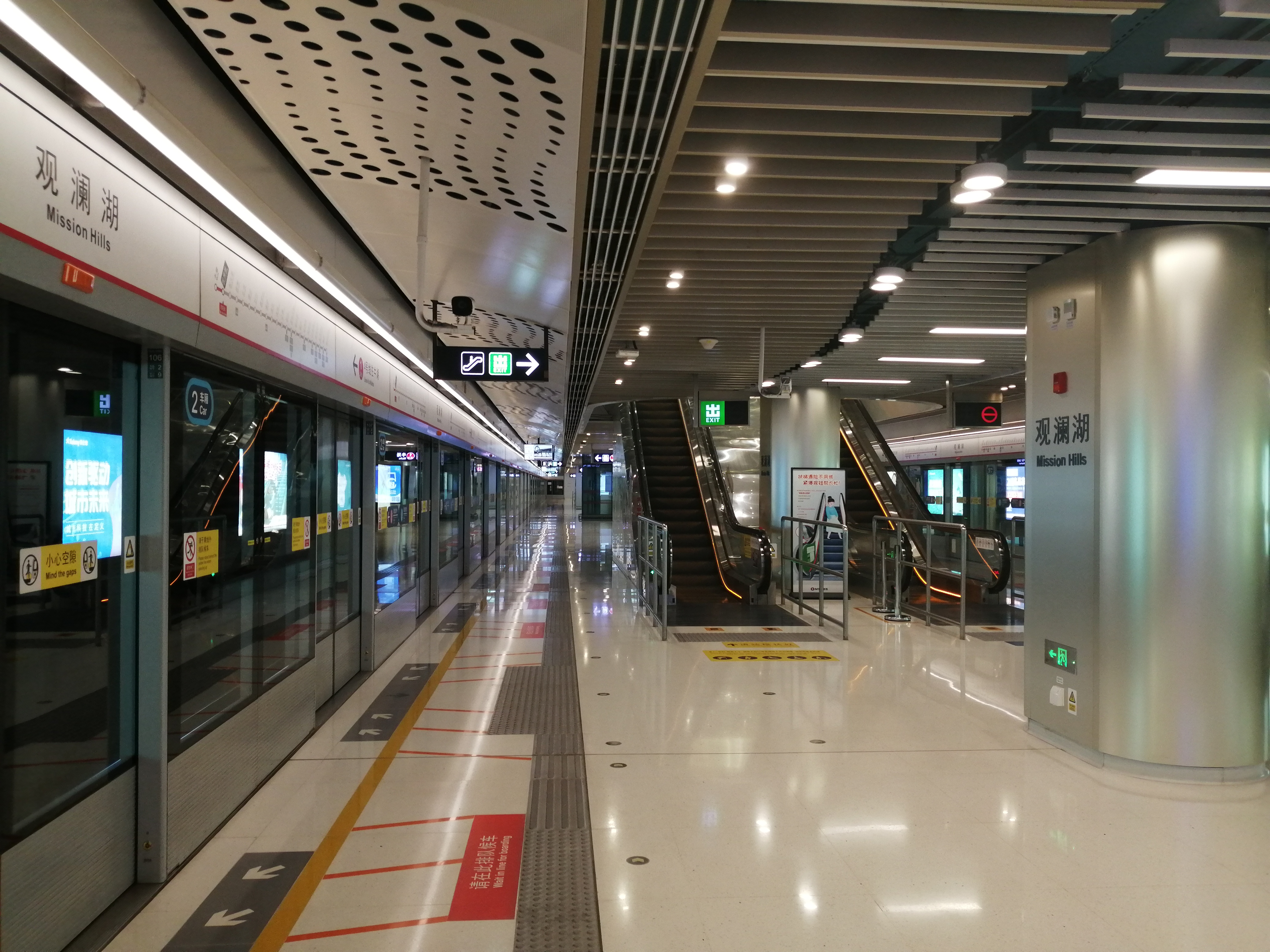
- Platform

General information
- Location: Longhua District, Shenzhen, Guangdong; China
- Coordinates: 22°39′50″N 114°2′11″E
- Operated by: MTR Corporation (Shenzhen)
- Line: Line 4
- Platforms: 2 (1 island platform)
- Tracks: 2

Construction
- Structure type: Underground
- Accessible: Yes

History
- Opened: 28 October 2020; 5 years ago

Services
| Preceding station | Shenzhen Metro | Following station |
|---|---|---|
| Niuhu Terminus | Line 4 | Songyuanxia towards Futian Checkpoint |
Location

Mission Hills station (Chinese: 观澜湖站; pinyin: Guānlán Hú Zhàn) is a station on Line 4 of the Shenzhen Metro. It opened on 28 October 2020.

== Station layout ==
| G | - | Exit |
| B1F; Concourse | Lobby | Customer Service, Shops, Vending machines, ATMs |
| B2F; Platforms | Platform 2 | ← Line 4 towards Futian Checkpoint (Songyuanxia) |
| B2F; Platforms | Island platform, doors will open on the left |
| B2F; Platforms | Platform 1 | → Line 4 towards Niuhu (Terminus) → |

== Exits ==
| Exit | Destination |
|---|---|
| Exit A | |
| Exit B | Niuhu Police Station, Bromsgrove School Mission Hills |
| Exit C | |
| Exit D | Songyuanxia Zhongxin Xincun, Guanlanhu International Building |
| Exit E | |

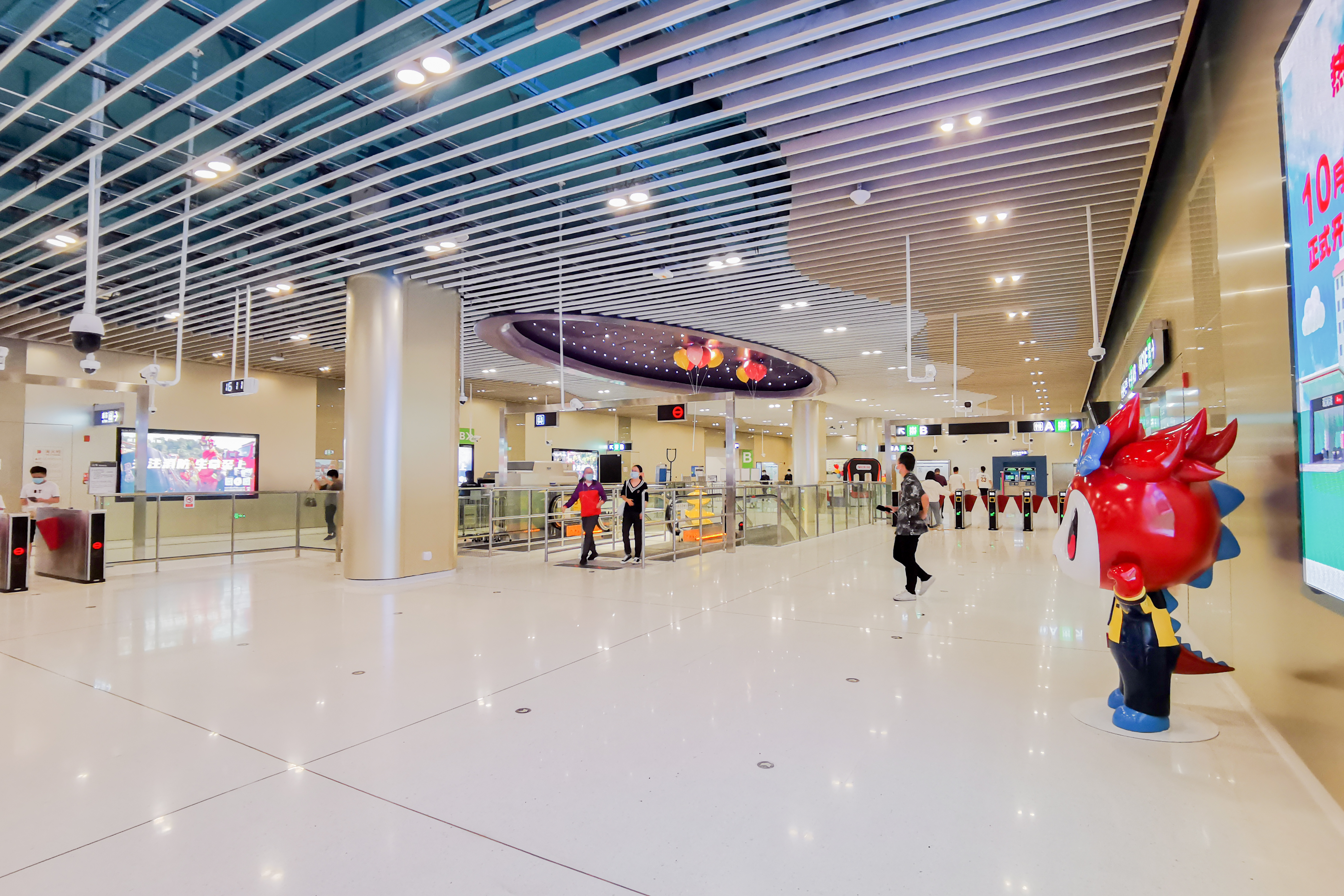
Concourse

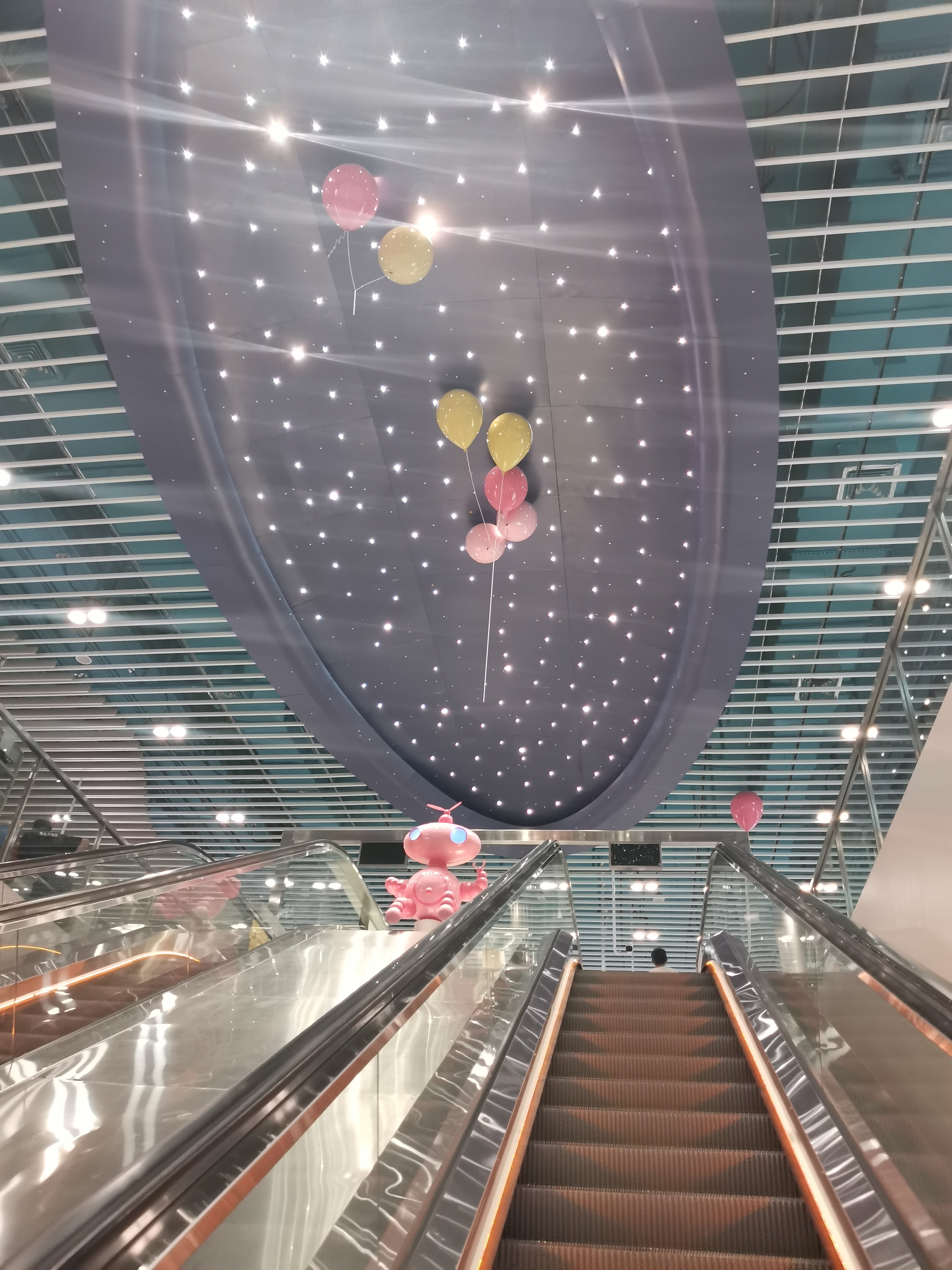
Art installation
