= Zhucun station (Shenzhen Metro) =

Metro station in Shenzhen, Guangdong, China

Zhucun 竹村
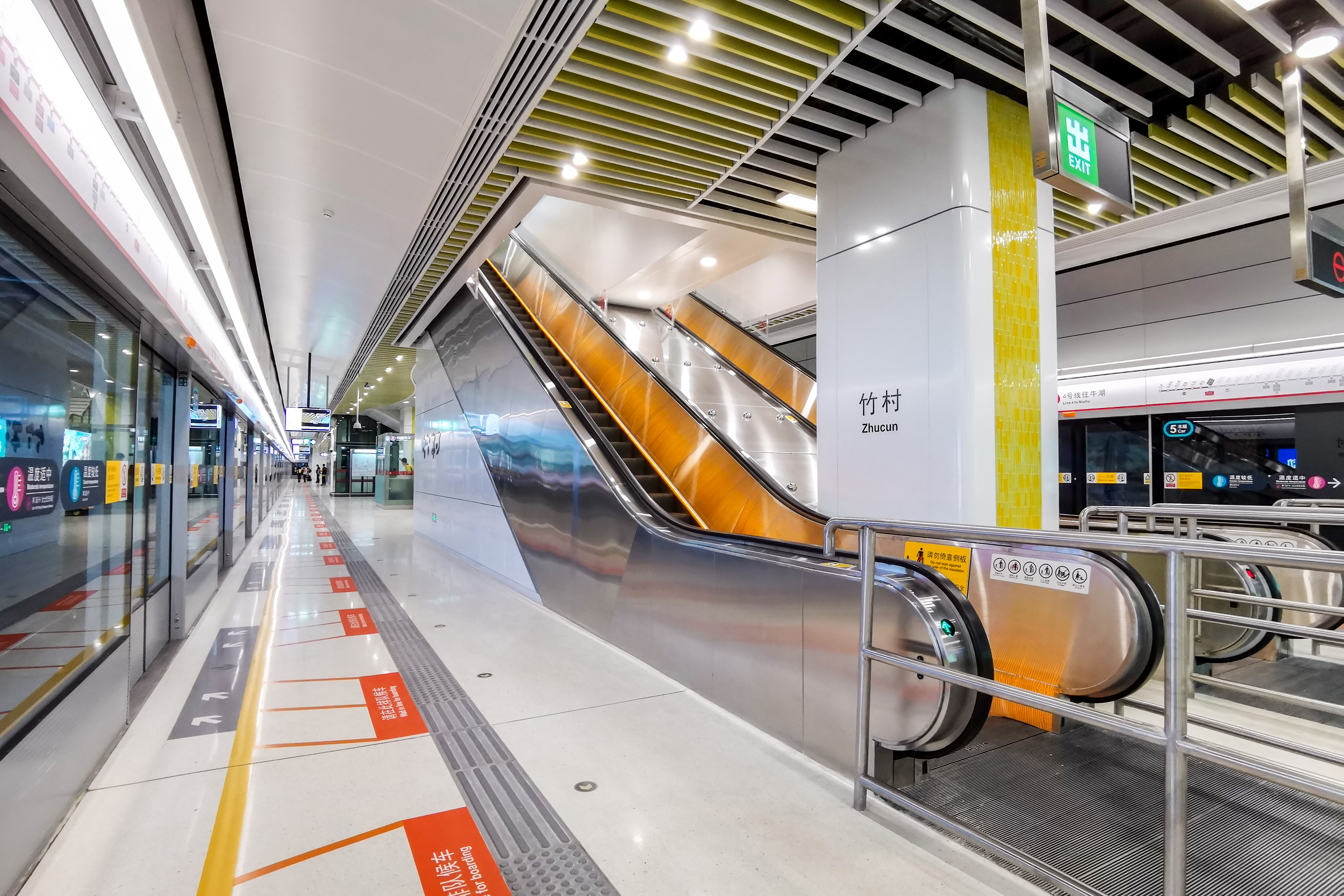
- Platform

General information
- Location: Longhua District, Shenzhen, Guangdong; China
- Coordinates: 22°39′50″N 114°2′11″E
- Operated by: MTR Corporation (Shenzhen)
- Line: Line 4
- Platforms: 2 (1 island platform)
- Tracks: 2

Construction
- Structure type: Underground
- Accessible: Yes

History
- Opened: 28 October 2020; 5 years ago

Services
Preceding station	Shenzhen Metro	Following station
Xikeng towards Niuhu	Line 4	Qinghu North towards Futian Checkpoint
Location

Zhucun station (Chinese: 竹村站; pinyin: Zhúcūn Zhàn) is a station on Line 4 of the Shenzhen Metro. It opened on 28 October 2020.

== Station layout ==
G	-	Exit
B1F; Concourse	Lobby	Customer Service, Shops, Vending machines, ATMs
B2F; Platforms	Platform 2	← Line 4 towards Futian Checkpoint (Qinghu North)
B2F; Platforms	Island platform, doors will open on the left
B2F; Platforms	Platform 1	→ Line 4 towards Niuhu (Xikeng) →

== Exits ==
Exit		Destination
Exit A		Guanlan People's Court of Longhua District
Exit B	B1	Fumin Police Station Auxiliary Police Squadron
Exit B	B2	
Exit C		Zuncun xiqu, Zuncun Kindergarten, Bowen Kindergarten
Exit D		Zhucunlaowei, Zhucun dongqu

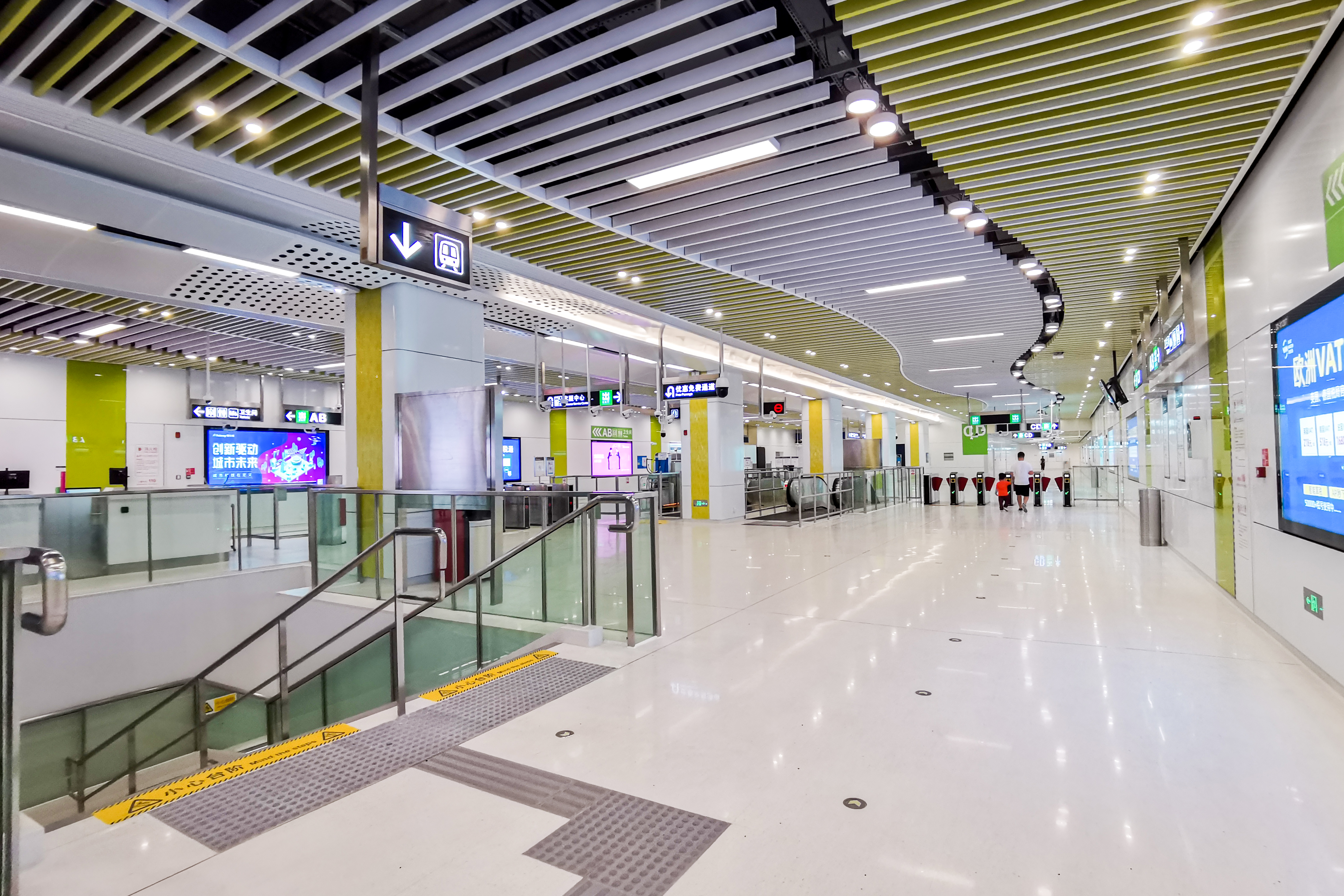
Concourse
