= Line 4 (Shenzhen Metro) =

Metro line in Shenzhen, China

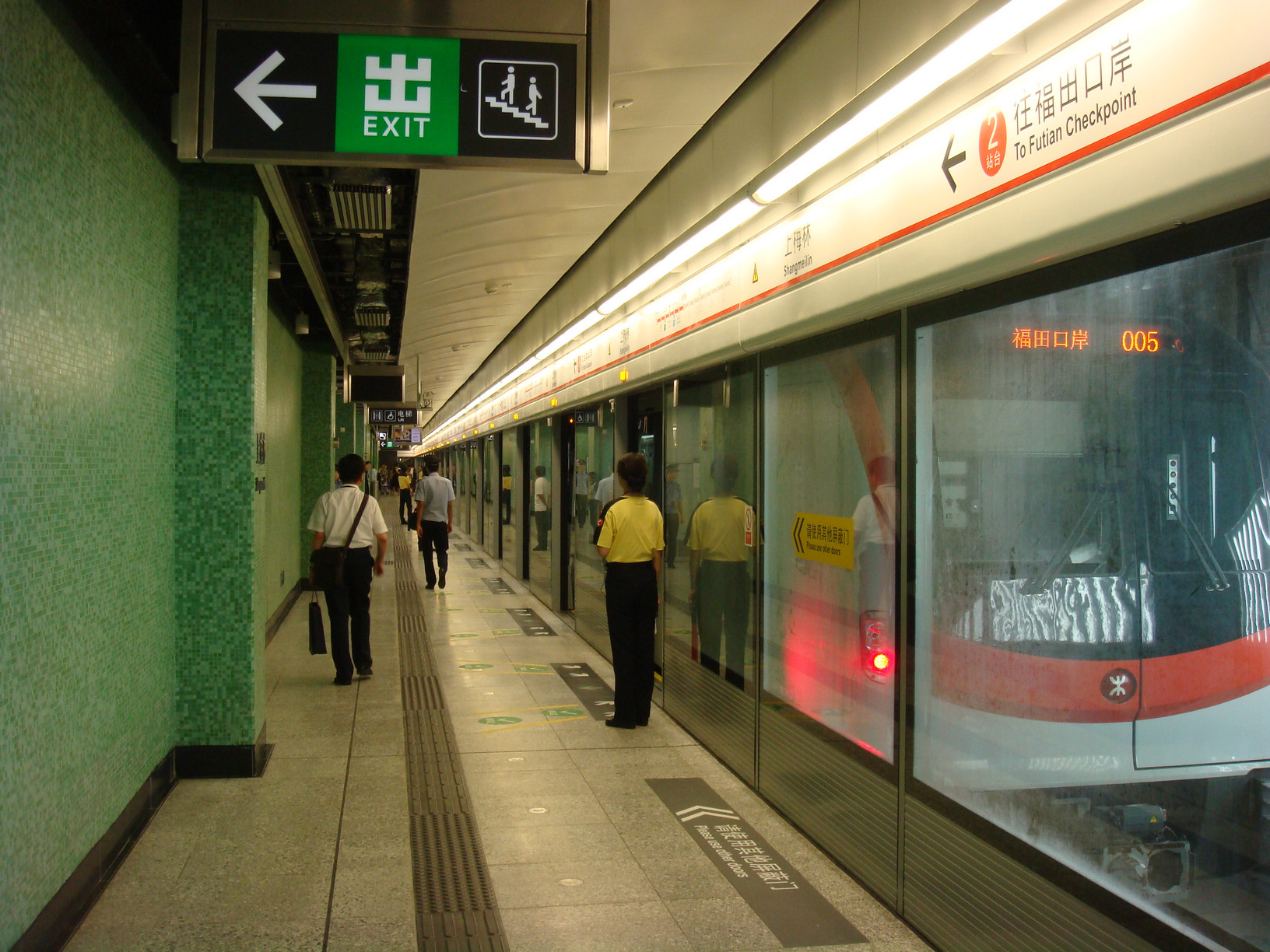
- MTR-designed Shangmeilin station

Overview
- Other name(s): Longhua line (龙华线; 龍華線; Lónghuá xiàn; Lung4 Waa4 Sin3)
- Native name: 四号线; 四號線; Sìhào Xiàn; Sei3 Hou6 Sin3
- Status: Operational
- Locale: Futian and Longhua districts Shenzhen, Guangdong
- Termini: Futian Checkpoint; Niuhu
- Stations: 23
- Color on map: Red (#dc241f)

Service
- Type: Rapid transit
- System: Shenzhen Metro
- Services: 1
- Operator(s): Shenzhen Metro Group (28 December 2004 - 1 July 2010); MTR Corporation (Shenzhen) (1 July 2010 - present)
- Depot(s): Longhua depot Guanlan Stabling Yard
- Rolling stock: CRRC Nanjing Puzhen Type A Metro Rolling Stock (401–452)(6A)
- Daily ridership: 911,300 (peak on 31 December 2025)

History
- Opened: Phase 1: 28 December 2004; 21 years ago Phase 2: 16 June 2011; 15 years ago
- Last extension: 28 October 2020; 5 years ago

Technical
- Line length: 31.3 km (19.45 mi)
- Number of tracks: Double-track
- Character: Underground and elevated
- Track gauge: 1,435 mm (4 ft 8 1/2 in) standard gauge
- Electrification: 1,500 V DC overhead line
- Operating speed: 80 km/h (50 mph)
- Signalling: FTGS Quasi-Moving block Siemens Trainguard LZB 700M

Line 4 of the Shenzhen Metro, formerly branded as the Longhua line, runs South–North from Futian Checkpoint to Niuhu. The line serves Futian District and Longhua District of Shenzhen.

The line originally used 4-car trains, making it extremely crowded; although it still carried over 250,000 people daily, peaking at 516,100 on 5 May 2014. Stations feature electronic passenger information systems, which display estimated train arrival times.

When the second phase of the line opened in 2011, there were only eight trains which were completely unable to meet passenger demand. By 2012, 24 trains were in service. On 26 January 2014, the first 6-car train entered service, and as of 30 January 2015 all trains are 6 cars, 2 months earlier than planned.

The line is currently coloured red, although it was originally coloured blue until 1 July 2010.

== Operation by MTR ==
Line 4's operation and management was handed over to MTR Corporation (Shenzhen), a subsidiary of MTR Corporation on 1 July 2010 from Shenzhen Metro Group (for 30 years, until 2040) under a BOT basis.

Upon MTR's takeover, elements of the existing stations were modified to match MTR Hong Kong's styles, such as changing of lighting, station maps and signs, posters and the introduction of station art similar to those found within stations in the Hong Kong MTR. English station names were also modified (i.e. 'Futiankouan' changed to 'Futian Checkpoint') for easier recognition, and staff uniform and help desks were also changed to match the styles seen in Hong Kong's MTR. The line 4 color on map was changed from blue to red.

The English font type and tickets remain unchanged.

=== MTR Fare Saver ===
An MTR Fare Saver kiosk is available in Futian Checkpoint. Passengers with the Hong Kong Octopus card can utilise the kiosk and receive a HK$3 discount on the subsequent trip from Lok Ma Chau on MTR Hong Kong's East Rail line.

== History ==
Segment	Commencement	Length	Station(s)	Name
Fumin — Children's Palace	28 December 2004	3.379 km (2.10 mi)	4	Phase 1 (initial section)
Futian Checkpoint — Fumin	28 June 2007	1.100 km (0.68 mi)	1	Phase 1 (extension)
Children's Palace — Qinghu	16 June 2011	15.481 km (9.62 mi)	10	Phase 2
Shenzhen North	22 June 2011	-	1	Phase 2
Qinghu — Niuhu	28 October 2020	10.791 km (6.71 mi)	8	Phase 3

== Service routes ==
- Futian Checkpoint — Niuhu
- Futian Checkpoint — Xikeng (Working days peak hours only)

== Stations ==
From 19 July 2025, the weekend daytime interval of Line 4 reduced from 5 minutes to 4 minutes. Every weekend at 14:00, Shenzhen North Railway Station opens a passage without security check connecting high-speed rail to the metro station, allowing passengers to exit without a second security check.

Service routes		Station name		Connections	Nearby bus stops	Distance km		Location
Service routes		English	Chinese	Connections	Nearby bus stops	Distance km		Location
●	●	Futian Checkpoint	福田口岸	10 (Note: Out-of-station interchange.); East Rail line (Note: System transfer via Lok Ma Chau [thru border check].)	26 362 B685 B905 B957 M499	0.00	0.00	Futian
●	●	Fumin	福民	7 10	26 34 52 60 62 63 73 303 339 377 M102 M103 M133 M138 M169 M347 M476	1.10	1.10	Futian
●	●	Convention and Exhibition Center	会展中心	1	3 34 38 60 64 316 E10 E25 E38 M133 M192 M194 M198 M224 M347 M390 M454 M459 M500 M519 M588 Peak-express 27（高快27） Peak-express 31（高快31） Peak-express 47（高快47） Peak-time 23（高峰23） Peak-time 29（高峰29）	1.35	2.45	Futian
●	●	Civic Center	市民中心	2 8	34 38 60 64 326 M192 M347 M390 M454 M459 M500 M588 Peak-express 28（高快28） Peak-express 47（高快47） Peak-express 60（高快60） Peak-time 16（高峰16）City Night Sightseeing Line - Yellow Line（城市夜景线-黄线）	0.80	3.25	Futian
●	●	Children's Palace	少年宫	3	10 41 46 54 65 108 111 215 383 M262 M372 Peak-time 123（高峰123）	0.70	3.95	Futian
●	●	Lianhua North	莲花北		11 12 14 58 71 104 222 323 M392 Lianhuashan Park 1 （莲花山公园1）	1.30	5.25	Futian
●	●	Shangmeilin	上梅林	9	60 201 216 218 324 334 374 B821 M312 M460 Peak-time 201（高峰201）	1.20	6.45	Futian
●	●	Minle	民乐	22; 6 (via Meilinguan)	7 34 60 75 81 234 313 316 317 317区间 324 328 334 336 339 390 393 620 812 B653 B656 B657 B666 M112 M152 M193 M202 M207 M222 M262 M263 M302 M342 M346 M347 M383 M391 M392 M398 M401 M405 M453 M459 M500 M577 M579 Peak-express 6（高快6） Peak-express 14（高快14） Peak-express 17（高快17） Peak-express 27（高快27） Peak-time 21（高峰21） Peak-time 23（高峰23） Peak-time 34（高峰34） Peak-time 37（高峰37） Peak-time 91（高峰91）	2.95	9.40	Longhua
●	●	Baishilong	白石龙	27	B653 B655 B657 B877 E3 M262 M342 M365 M385 Peak-time 91（高峰91）	1.05	10.45	Longhua
●	●	Shenzhen North	深圳北站	5 6 XS GSH IOQ	75 81 B917A E7 E11 E22 M130 M207 M217 M225 M299 M300 M339 M340 M341 M347 M352 M353 M354 M363 M365-anticlockwise（M365外环） M385 M393 M405 M459 M462 M477 M566 M567 M572 M579 M597 Peak-time 120（高峰120） Peak-time 137（高峰137）	1.60	12.05	Longhua
●	●	Hongshan	红山	6	43 B917A B917B M115 M130 M204 M352 M379 M381 M420 Peak-time 21（高峰21）	1.45	13.50	Longhua
●	●	Shangtang	上塘		B915 M130 M212 M214 M381 M500 M537 M579 Peak-time 23（高峰23） Peak-time 150（高峰150）	2.00	15.50	Longhua
●	●	Longsheng	龙胜		612 E12 M130 M156 M193 M214 M301 M341 M415 M420 M462 M516 M537 M538 M544 M580 NA2 Peak-time 16（高峰16） Peak-express 70（高快70）	1.05	16.55	Longhua
●	●	Longhua	龙华	25	324 621 B920 E1 E9 M112 M152 M180 M211 M214 M244 M269 M282A M282B M352 M379 M401 M537 M538 M544 M577 M580 Peak-express 43（高快43） Peak-express 70（高快70） Peak-time 92（高峰92）	1.30	17.85	Longhua
●	●	Qinghu	清湖	Longhua Tram	B603 M212 M228 M264 M287 M302 M337 M339 M401 M450 M510 M517 M540 Peak-express 43（高快43）	2.10	19.95	Longhua
●	●	Qinghu North	清湖北		624 882 A7 B603 E36 M112 M128 M173 M212 M228 M264 M282A M282B M287 M302 M337 M401 M450 M477 M509 M517 M538 M554	0.95	20.90	Longhua
●	●	Zhucun	竹村		312 M152 M188 M225 M263 M264 M269 M354 M360 M370 M392 M408 M424 M503 M509 M543 Peak-time 92（高峰92）	1.70	22.60	Longhua
●	●	Xikeng	茜坑		312 627 M135 M152 M188 M225 M263 M269 M360 M391 M392 M408 M424 M464 M503 M534 M597 Peak-time 157（高峰157）	1.20	23.80	Longhua
●		Changhu	长湖		312 627 B769 B918 E16 E40 M135 M188 M226 M258 M263 M269 M285 M302 M360 M392 M408 M545 Peak-time 178（高峰178）	1.50	25.30	Longhua
●		Guanlan	观澜	Longhua Tram (Xinlan)	312 321 627 E16 E40 M188 M226 M258 M267 M269 M285 M287 M289 M302 M354 M360 M392 M408 Peak-time 66（高峰66）	1.30	26.60	Longhua
●		Songyuanxia	松元厦	22	312 321 627 E16 E40 M188 M226 M258 M267 M269 M285 M287 M289 M302 M344 M354 M360 M392 M408 Peak-time 66（高峰66）	1.30	27.90	Longhua
●		Mission Hills	观澜湖		312 B877 B878 B880 B921 M258 M285 M289	1.20	29.10	Longhua
●		Niuhu	牛湖		312 B877 B878 B880 B921 E16 M258 M289 Dongguan 772（莞772）	1.40	30.50	Longhua

== Rolling Stock ==
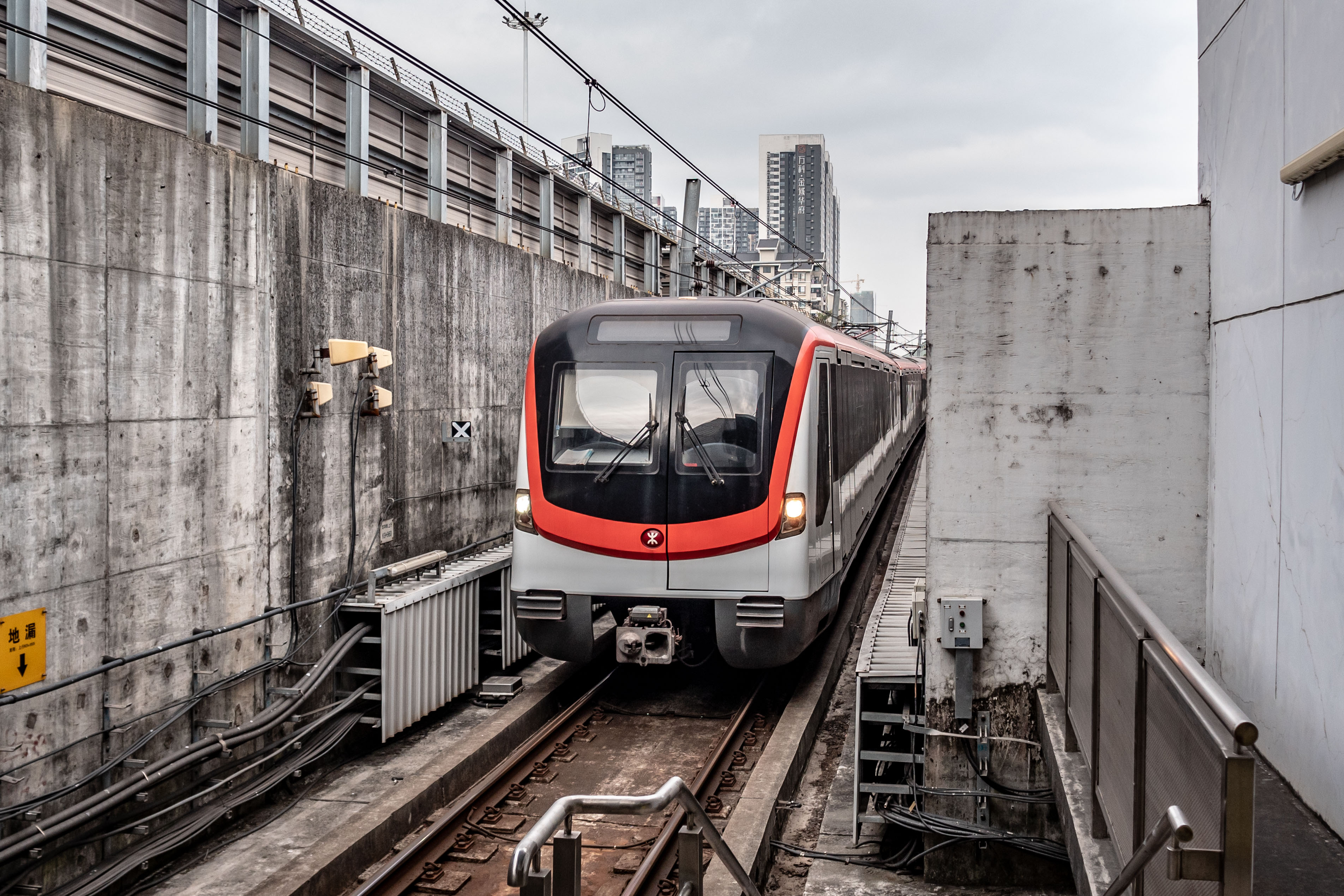
Line 4 train at Minle station

Type	Date of manufacture	Series	Sets	Serial number	Assembly	Notes
Type A	2010–2012	A-size stock	28	401–428	Tc+Mp+T+Mp+Mp+Tc	Manufactured by CSR Nanjing Puzhen
Type A	2019–2020	A-size stock	24	429–452	Tc+Mp+T+Mp+Mp+Tc	Manufactured by CRRC Nanjing Puzhen

== Accidents and incidents ==
At 8:30 am on 8 July 2026, due to equipment failure was occurred at Line 4 in both directions, causing the train to stay on the line for 50 minutes without moving.
