= Niuhu station =

Metro station in Shenzhen, Guangdong, China

Niuhu 牛湖
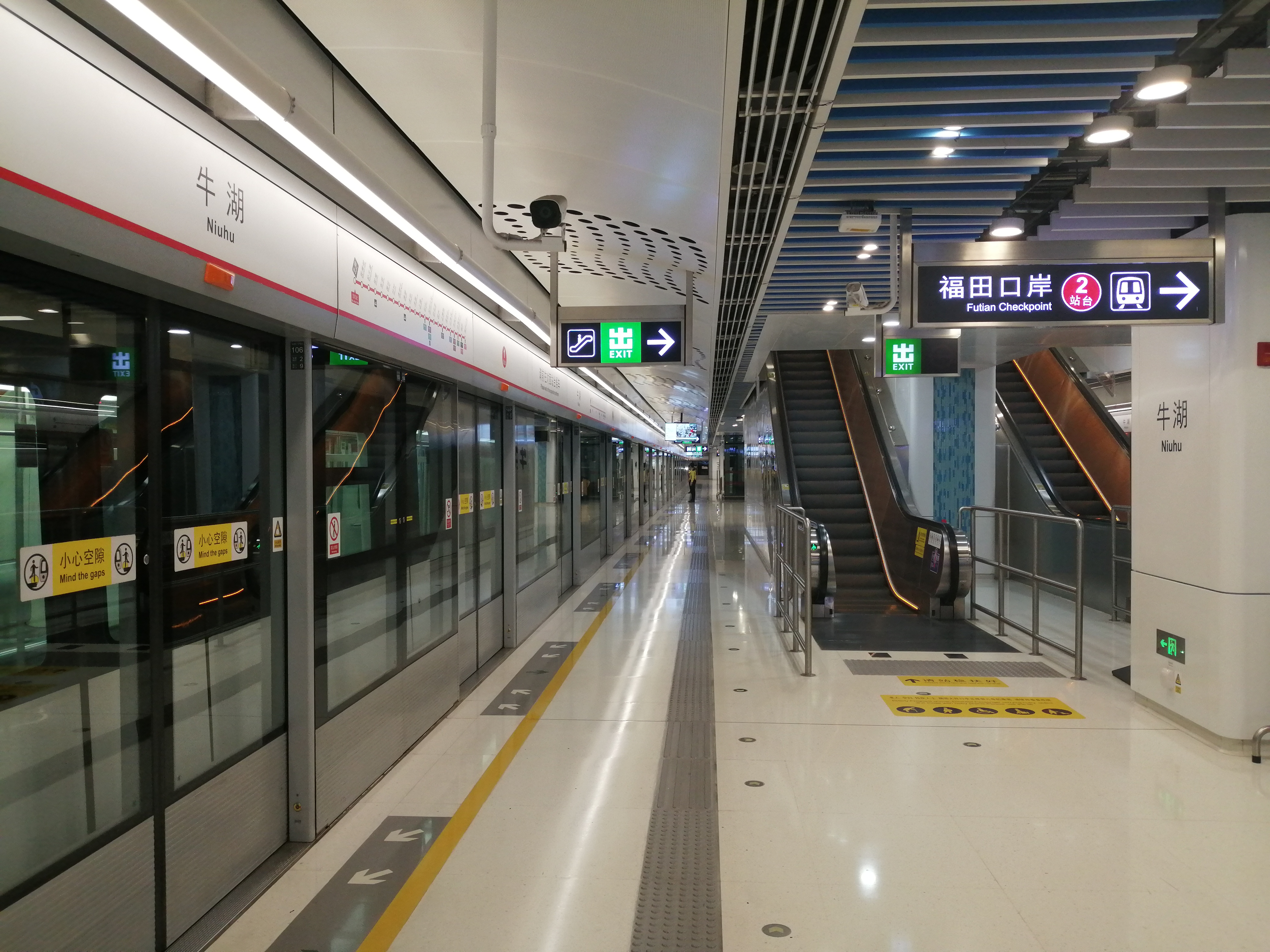
- Platform

General information
- Location: Longhua District, Shenzhen, Guangdong; China
- Coordinates: 22°39′50″N 114°2′11″E
- Operated by: MTR Corporation (Shenzhen)
- Line: Line 4
- Platforms: 2 (1 island platform)
- Tracks: 2

Construction
- Structure type: Underground
- Accessible: Yes

History
- Opened: 28 October 2020; 5 years ago

Services
Preceding station	Shenzhen Metro	Following station
Terminus	Line 4	Mission Hills towards Futian Checkpoint
Location

Niuhu station (Chinese: 牛湖站; pinyin: Niúhú Zhàn; Jyutping: ngau4 wu4 zaam6) is the northern terminal station on Line 4 of the Shenzhen Metro. It opened on 28 October 2020.

== Station layout ==
G	-	Exit
B1F; Concourse	Lobby	Customer Service, Shops, Vending machines, ATMs
B2F; Platforms	Platform 2	← Line 4 towards Futian Checkpoint (Mission Hills)
B2F; Platforms	Island platform, doors will open on the left
B2F; Platforms	Platform 1	→ Line 4 termination platform →

== Exits ==
Exit	Destination
Exit A	Guangpei Kindergarten, Shisan Xiaoqu Xiqu, Shisancun
Exit B	Aohu Laocun
Exit C	Mutouhu Cun, Niuhu Xincun, Aoding, Jinfa Building, Guangpei School, Guangpei Primary School
Exit D	New Sun Second Kindergarten, Aoding Xincun

== Gallery ==
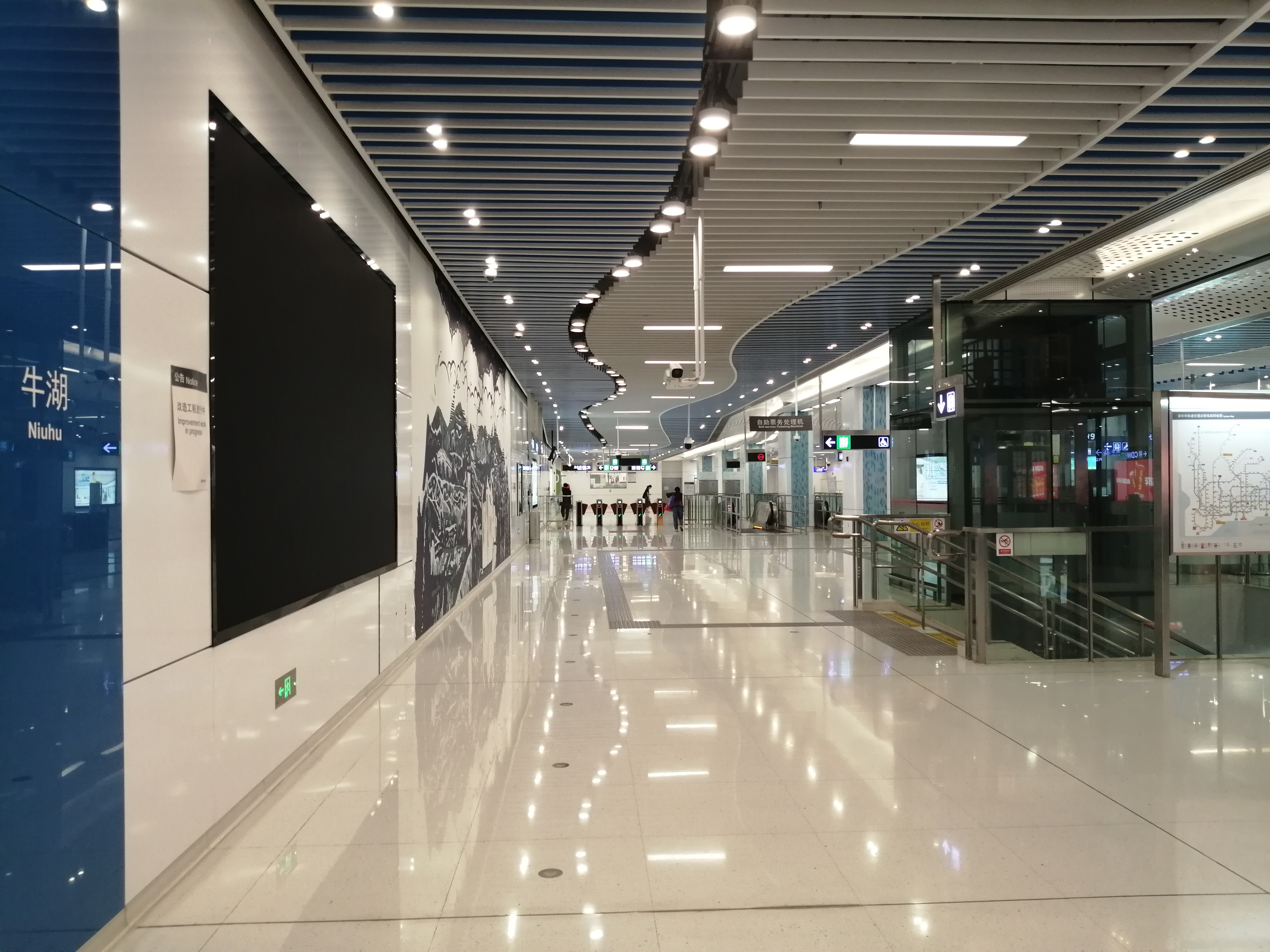
Concourse
