= Futian Checkpoint station =

Metro station in Shenzhen, Guangdong, China

Futian Checkpoint 福田口岸
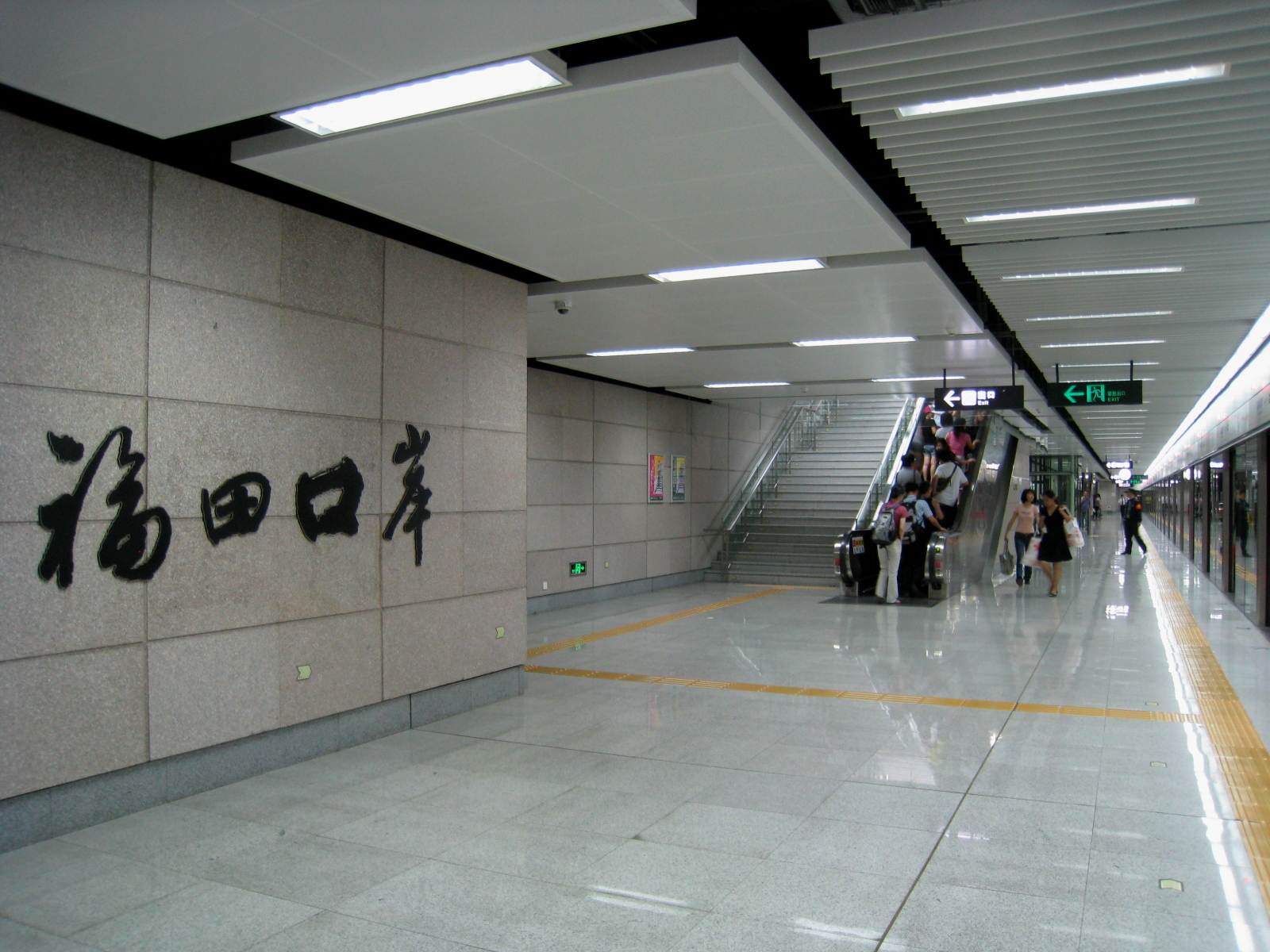

Chinese name
- Chinese: 福田口岸
Transcriptions
Yue: Cantonese
- Jyutping: fuk^{1} tin^{4} hau^{2} on^{6} zaam^{6}

General information
- Location: Futian District, Shenzhen, Guangdong; China
- Coordinates: 22.5182°N 114.0650°E
- Operated by: MTR Corporation (Shenzhen); SZMC (Shenzhen Metro Group)
- Lines: Line 4 Line 10
- Platforms: 6 (2 island platforms and 2 side platforms)
- Tracks: 4
- Connections: East Rail line (Lok Ma Chau station)

Construction
- Structure type: Underground
- Accessible: Yes

History
- Opened: 28 June 2007; 18 years ago ( Line 4); 18 August 2020; 5 years ago ( Line 10)
- Previous names: Futiankouan; Huanggang

Services
Preceding station	Shenzhen Metro	Following station
Fumin towards Niuhu	Line 4	Terminus
Fumin towards Shuangyong Street	Line 10	Terminus
Across mainland China–Hong Kong boundary
Preceding station	MTR	Following station
Sheung Shui towards Admiralty	East Rail line transfer at Lok Ma Chau	Terminus
Track layout
4 Upper platforms
10 Lower platforms
Location

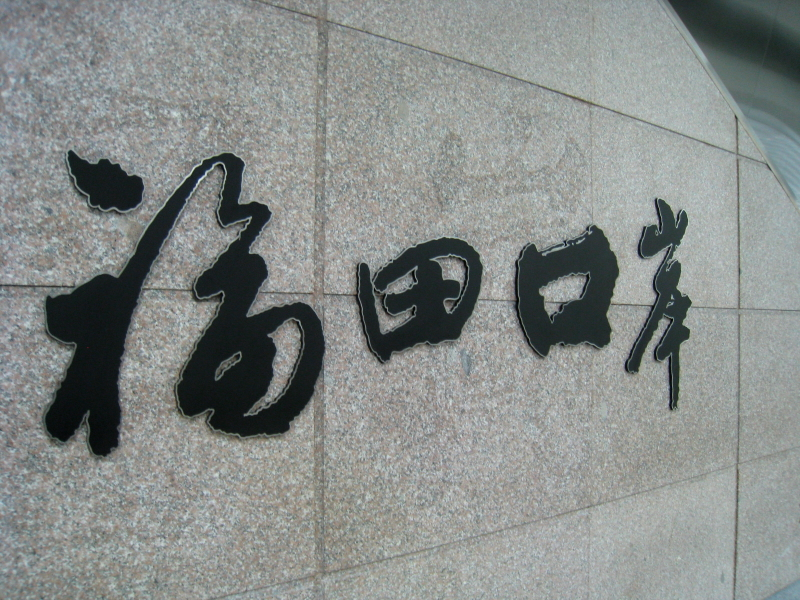
Futian Checkpoint Station

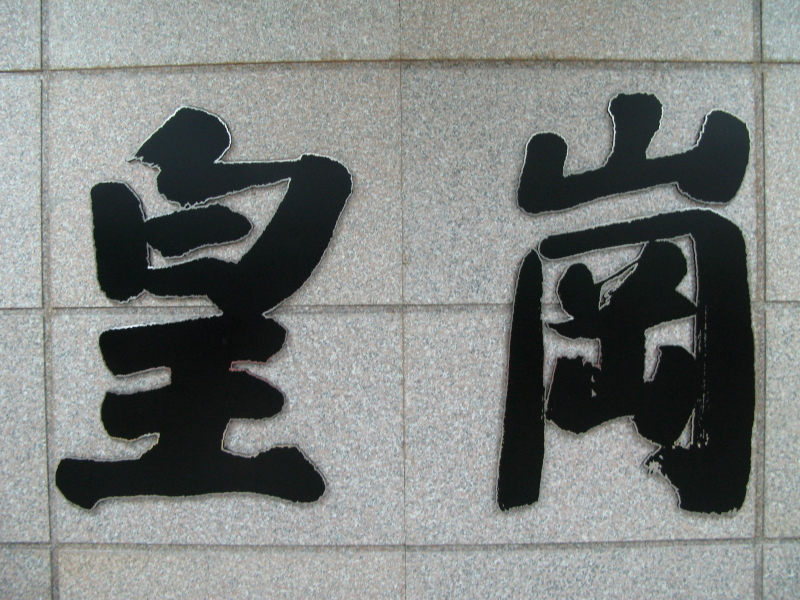
Original calligraphy showing Chinese characters of "Huanggang" in the station platform

Futian Checkpoint station (Chinese: 福田口岸站; pinyin: fú tián kǒu àn zhàn; Jyutping: fuk1 tin4 hau2 on6 zaam6) is a terminus of Line 4 and Line 10 of the Shenzhen Metro. Line 4 platforms opened on 28 June 2007 and Line 10 platforms on 18 August 2020. It is located at the ground level of Futian Port Control Point in Futian District, Shenzhen, People's Republic of China, and it is the only ground station in Shenzhen Metro. Futian Port Control Point and Futian Checkpoint Station are connected to Hong Kong's Lok Ma Chau station by a footbridge.

The station was called Huanggang (皇岗; huáng gǎng; wong4 gong1) because of its location near Huanggang, which is also an immigration control point between Shenzhen and Hong Kong. It was renamed to Futiankouan on 15 August 2008 to avoid confusion between Futian Port and Huanggang Port. "Kouan" (口岸) means a (immigration) port. Starting from 1 July 2010, with MTR Corporation (Shenzhen) taking over the operations and management of Line 4, the English name Futian Checkpoint is now used. A station called Huanggang Checkpoint opened at Huanggang Port in 2016.

== Station layout ==
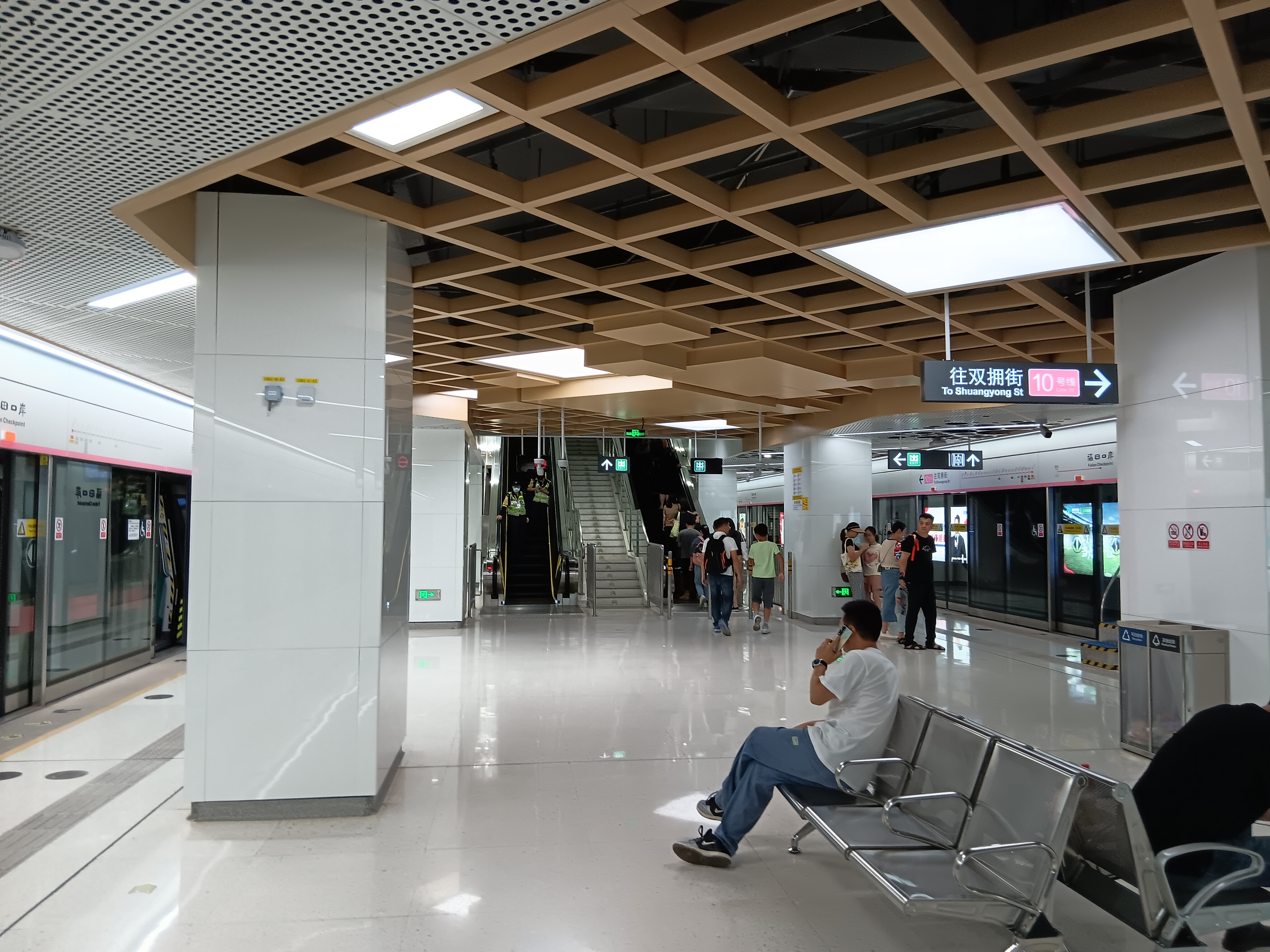
Line 10 platforms

There are a total of 5 levels in the Futian Checkpoint station. The 2nd and 3rd levels (above ground) are immigration facilities (being the arrivals hall and departures hall respectively), while the 1st level is Line 4 concourse. The 2 side platforms and an island platform are located on the basement 1st level, but only one island platform and 1 side platform is used in daily operations. Among them, the side platform serves as the unloading platform for trains arriving at the station, while the other island platform is used as the boarding platform for trains departing the station. This method is called the Spanish solution. Line 10 concourse is also located on the basement 1st level, but the transfer passage between Line 4 and Line 10 is under construction. Passengers need to out-of-station interchange Line 4. The basement 3rd level is Line 10 platforms.

=== Line 4 station layout ===
4F	Futian Port Control Point	Departures Hall, footbridge to Lok Ma Chau Spur Line Control Point (connects to East Rail line Lok Ma Chau station and Lok Ma Chau Spur Line Public Transport Interchange)
3F	Futian Port Control Point	Arrivals Hall, Arrivals Hall full body scanners, footbridge exit (for entering mainland only)
2F	Lobby of Line 4	Exit only, customer service centre
1F	Lobby of Line 4 (Note: Out-of-station interchange Line 10.), Exits of Line 10	Concourse, TVMs, Exit A and B, metro full body scanners, customer service centre, MTR Fare Saver
B1F; Platforms	Side platform, doors will open on the left for alighting passengers only
B1F; Platforms	Platform; 4 ↑ / 3 ↓	← Line 4 towards Niuhu (Fumin)
B1F; Platforms	Island platform, doors will open on the left/right for boarding passengers only
B1F; Platforms	Platform; 2 ↑ / 1 ↓	← Line 4 towards Niuhu (Fumin)
B1F; Platforms	Side platform, doors will open on the right for alighting passengers only

=== Line 10 station layout ===
1F	Ground level	Exit C, D and E
B1F; Concourse	Lobby of Line 10 (Note: Out-of-station interchange Line 4.)	Customer service centre, ticket vending machines, metro full body scanners
B2F; Platforms	Platform	← Line 10 towards Shuangyong Street (Fumin)
B2F; Platforms	Island platform, doors will open on the left
B2F; Platforms	Platform	Line 10 termination platform →

== Exits ==
Line	Exit		Destinations
Line 4	Exit A		Futian Port, Yuheng Road, Shenzhen Fuqiang Police Station, Futian Checkpoint East Square, Futian Checkpoint Underground Park, Futian Checkpoint Commercial Square, Tianze Garden, Eureka, Yuheng Garden, Yunong Village, The Gateway, The Bay Tower
Line 4	Exit B		Guihua Road, Futian Free Trade Zone Customs House, Futian Checkpoint West Square, Futian Checkpoint Bus Terminal
Line 10	Exit C		Futian Port, West side of Yuheng Rd (S), East side of Guohua Rd (S), Futian Checkpoint Departure Hall, Futian Checkpoint Bus Terminal, Haiyue Huacheng, Yuheng Garden, Gangcheng Huating, Gangtian Garden, Tianze Garden
Line 10	Exit D	D1	East side of Guohua Rd (N)
Line 10	Exit D	D2	Southside of Guohua Rd (E), East side of Puti Rd (S), West side of Fugang Rd (S), Jiafu Garden, Jingang Haoting, Xuanjia Huating, Fumin Public Security Community, Fumin Primary School
Line 10	Exit E		Southside of Puti Rd, Nanguang Mingshiyuan, Yintai Yuan, Xinguihua Village, Junhuang Mingju, Juya Yuan

== See also ==
- Futian Port Control Point
- Lok Ma Chau station
