= Trams in China =

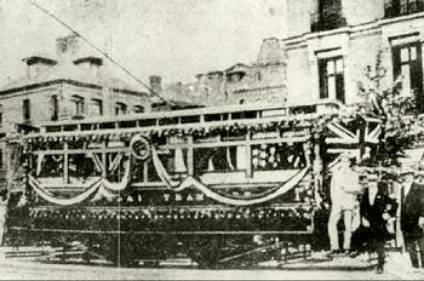
The first tram in Shanghai (1908)

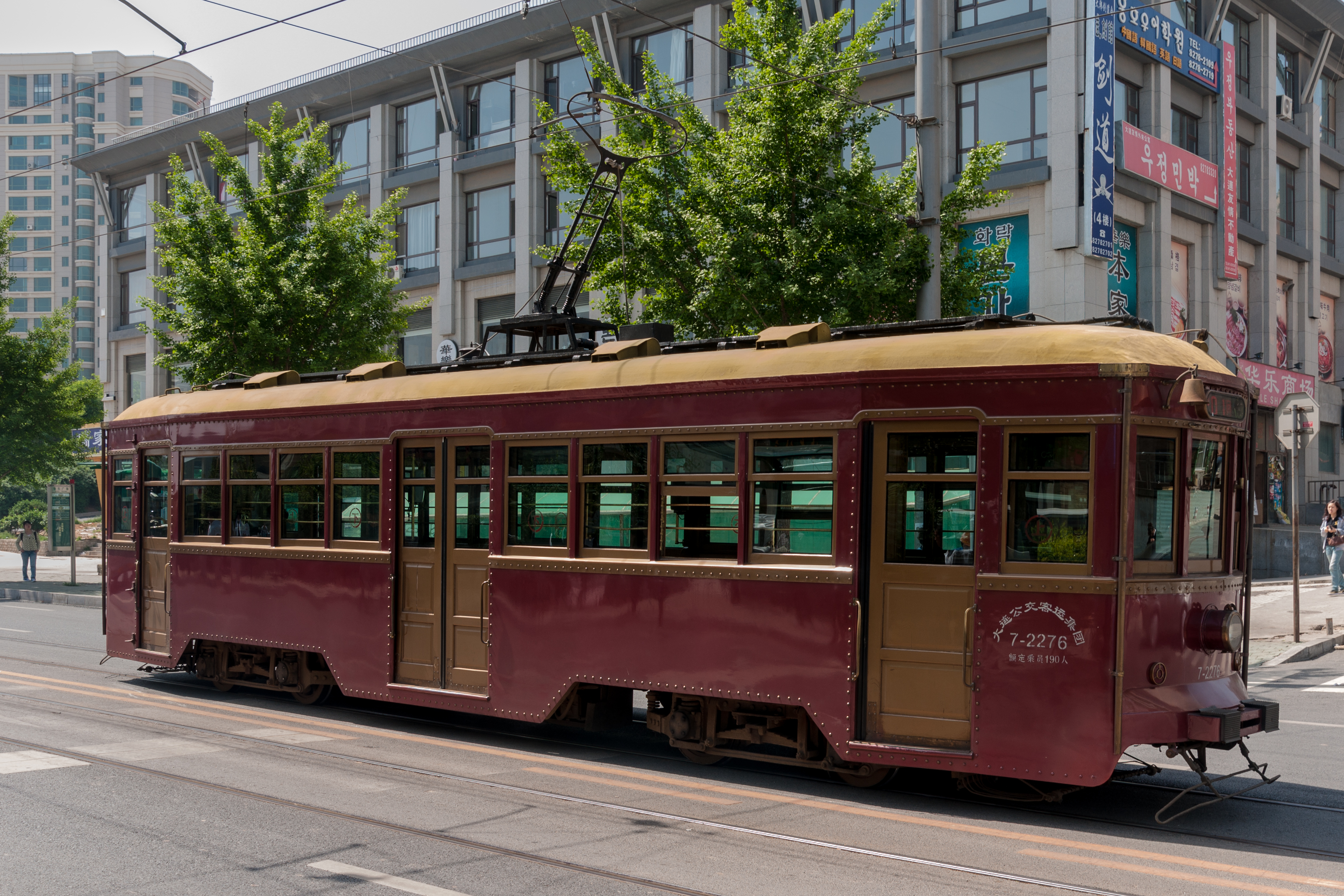
Dalian historical tram. Its use is still preserved to date in limited area in the city.

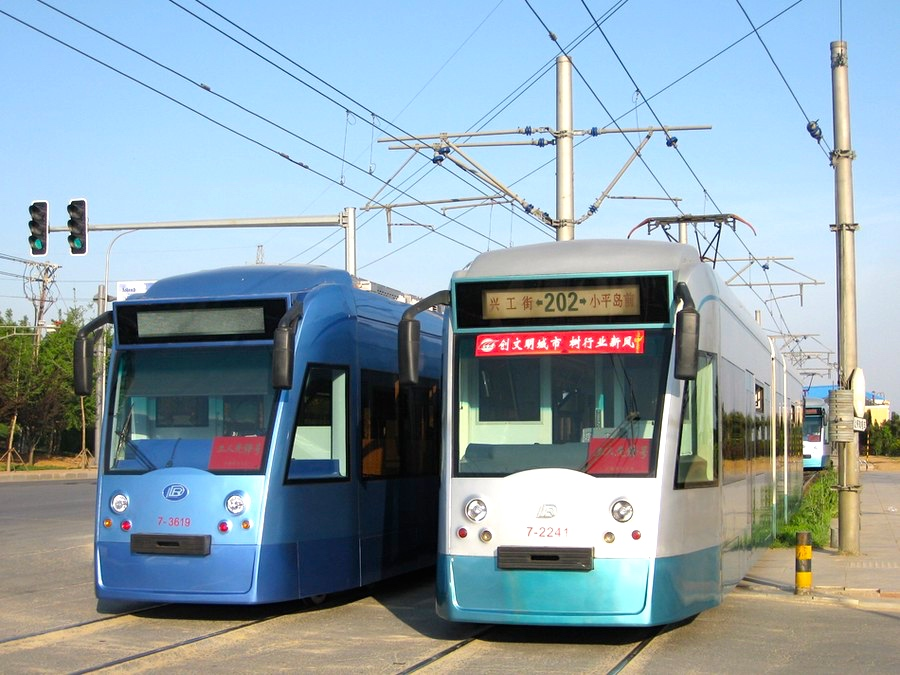
Dalian modern tram. Tram type DL6WA, mark Dalianren (meaning "Dalian people") manufactured by Tram Factory of Dalian Public Transport Group. The blue one is manufactured in 2009, the other in 2001–2003.

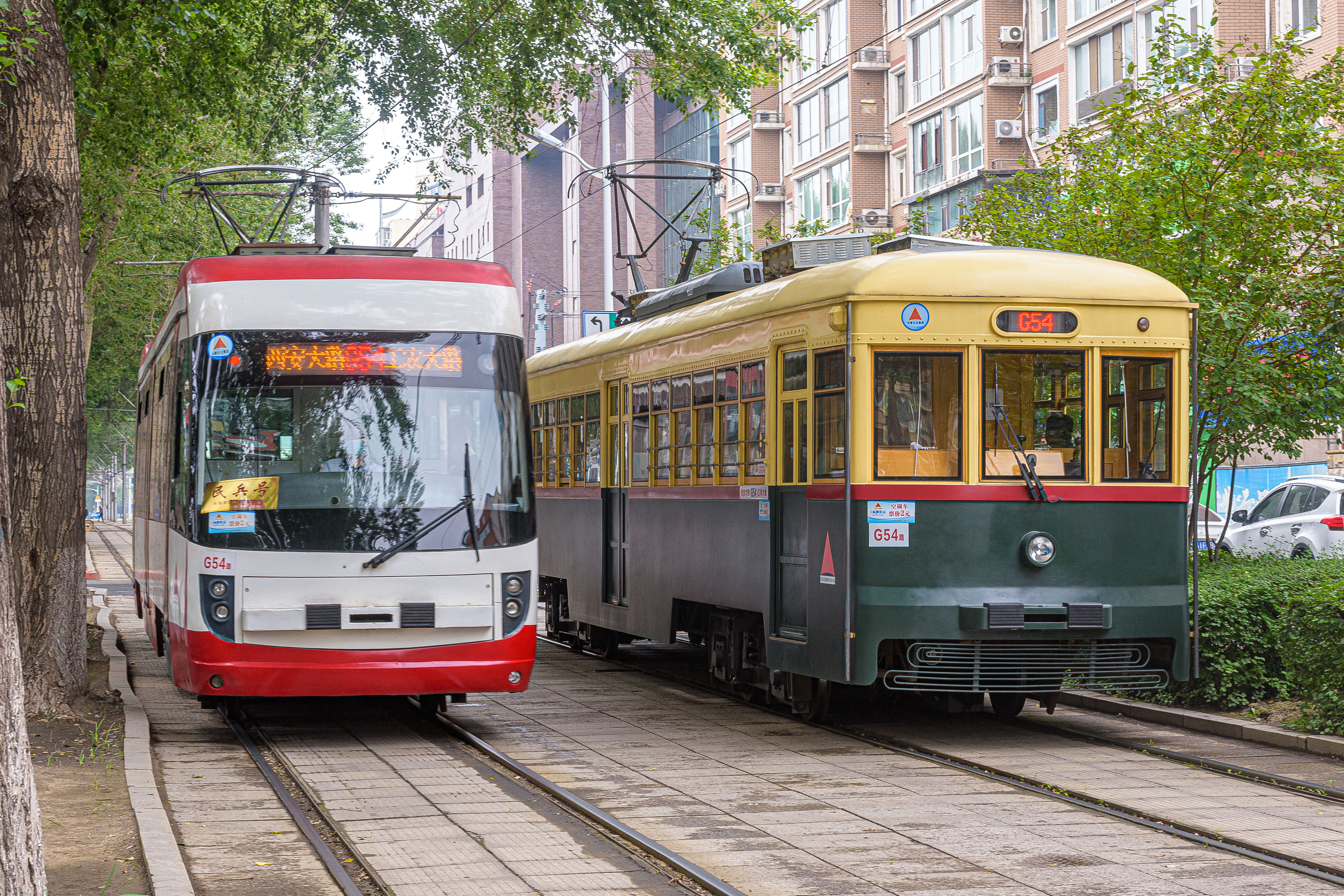
Changchun Trams

Several cities in China had tram systems during the 20th century. By the end of the century, only Dalian and Changchun remained extant. However the 21st century has seen a resurgence in tram transport systems as China attempts to combat with urban traffic congestion and pollution.

== List of historical tram systems ==
- Beijing had the first tram system in China. It opened in 1899 and connected Majiapu Railway Station to the south gate of the city. Trams were phased out 1958 to 1959.
- Fushun, Liaoning had a tram system circa 1902, operated by the Manchurian Railway Company with 26 trams.
- Tianjin city, had a tram system that opened in 1906. By 1933 it had 9 miles of track and operated 116 tramcars. It was closed by 1972.
- The Changchun tramway system started operations in 1942. By the 1950s the system covered 28 km (17 mi) with 98 cars. The system continues to operate today.
- In Shanghai there were three tram systems - two operated by the colonial powers of Britain and France and one by a Chinese company. The British system opened in 1908 and was the largest of the three. It had 7 lines and ran 216 tramcars. The British system merged with Chinese system in 1952. The French system opened the same year and its 3 lines ran 60 tramcars. Like the British it merged into the Chinese system in 1953. The Chinese system opened in 1913 and operated 52 tramcars over 4 lines of some 23.5 km (14.6 mi) in length. The last tram services ended in 1975.
- In Shenyang, Liaoning, a Japanese owned electric tramway opened in 1925 and replaced an earlier horse-drawn tram system that dated from around 1907. By 1937 it had expanded to cover 12 km (7.5 mi) of track and ran 21 tramcars. It was finally closed in 1973.
- Harbin, Heilongjiang had a system from 1927 with 8 lines and about 40 trams. The system closed in 1987.
- The city of Anshan, Liaoning, had a single tram line from 1956 till the late 1990s and the track was dug up in 2006.
- Dalian, Liaoning opened its first tram line on September 25, 1909. It was operated by South Manchuria Railway. By 1945, the system had 11 lines. Today 2 lines remain in operation covering 23.4 km (14.5 mi). The system is in the process up being updated with a mixture of old tram cars and new modern low floor cars in operation.

== New tram systems ==
Tianjin and Shanghai have recently introduced rubber tired trams for their TEDA Modern Guided Rail Tram and Zhangjiang Tram respectively, but both of these networks are closed now. However Shanghai has also reintroduced steel wheel tram system in Songjiang area.

In 2011, Shenyang city decided to construct a new tram network to complement its new metro network. The first three lines of the new system were opened on August 15, 2013. A year later, Nanjing opened the new Hexi trams just before the 2014 Youth Olympics. Since them new tram systems opened in a number of cities in China such as Qingdao, Guangzhou, Shenzhen, Suzhou, Zhuhai, Wuhan, Huai'an and Beijing.

=== Ridership ===
According to an expert affiliated with the Ministry of Transport, some of the newly constructed tram networks were built without considering the suitability of this mode of transportation well, leading to low-passenger numbers due to the tram lines serving less-densely populated outskirts, slow operating speeds and with unrecoverable operating costs. Some tram systems are built primarily to promote tourism, rather than filling a transportation niche and have been called white elephant projects, such as the Delingha Tram. Other tram systems have been more successful, such as the Huai'an Tram, Beijing's Xijiao line and Haizhu Tram.

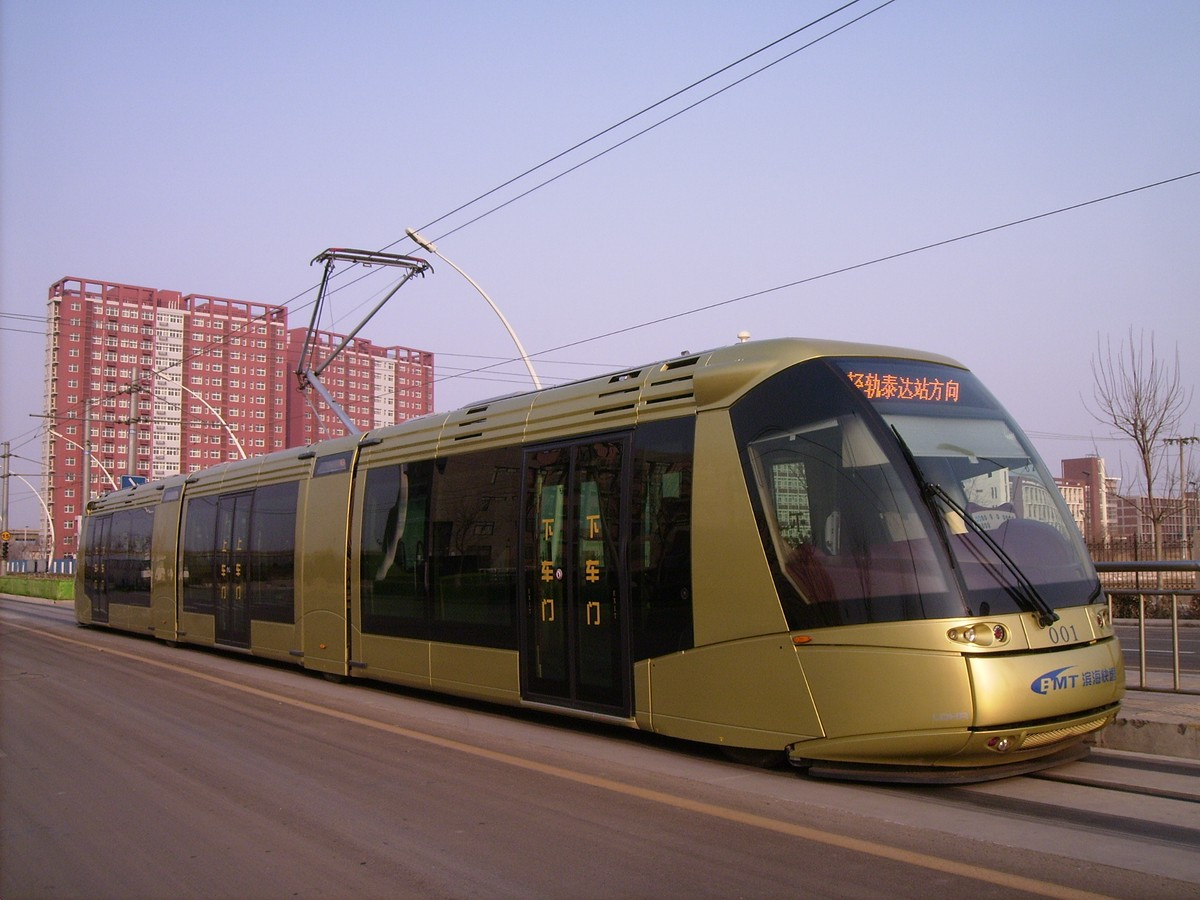
The TEDA tram opened in 2007 (closed in 2023).

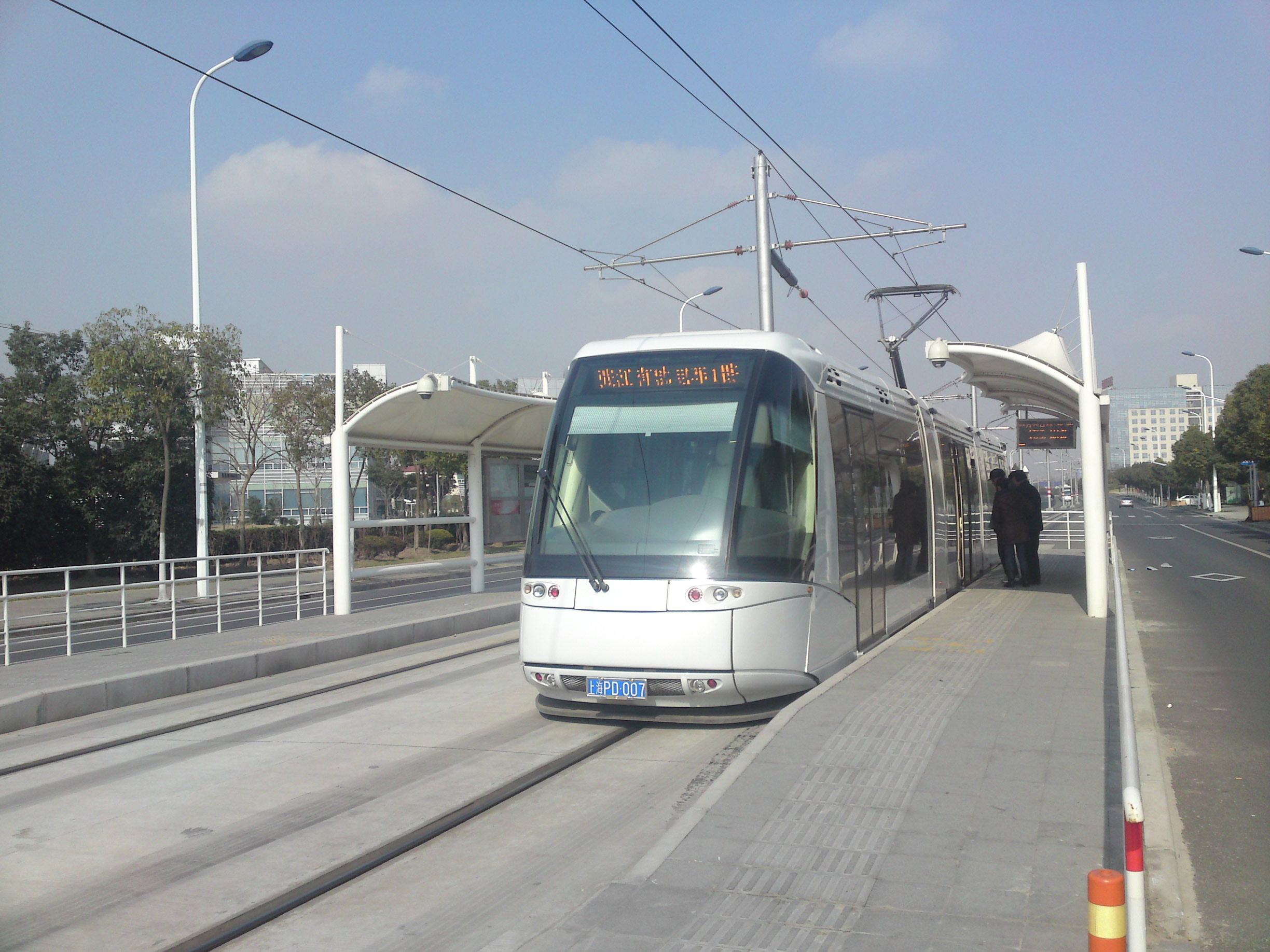
The Zhangjiang tram opened in 2010 (closed in 2023).

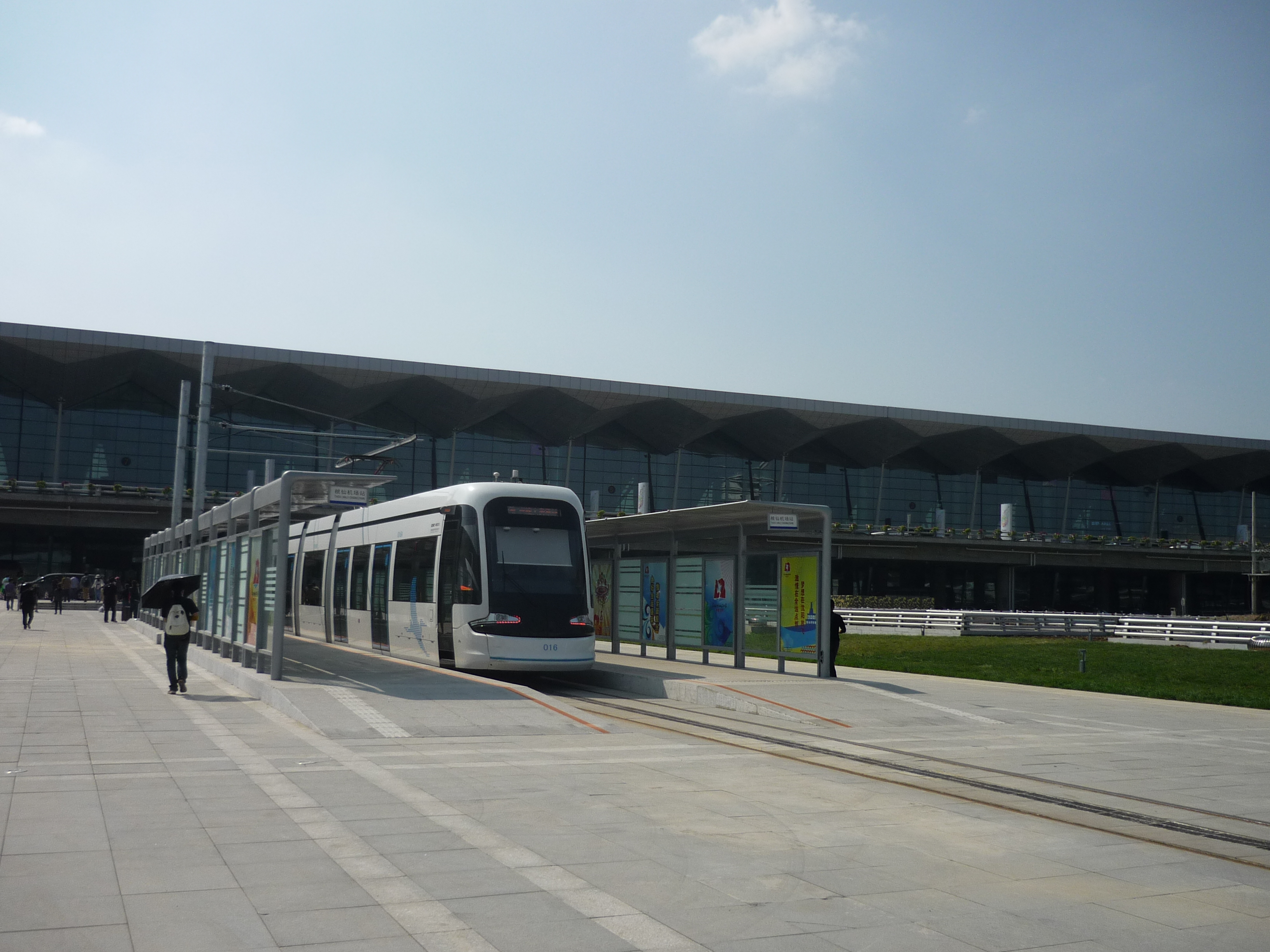
Shenyang Modern Tram opened in 2013.

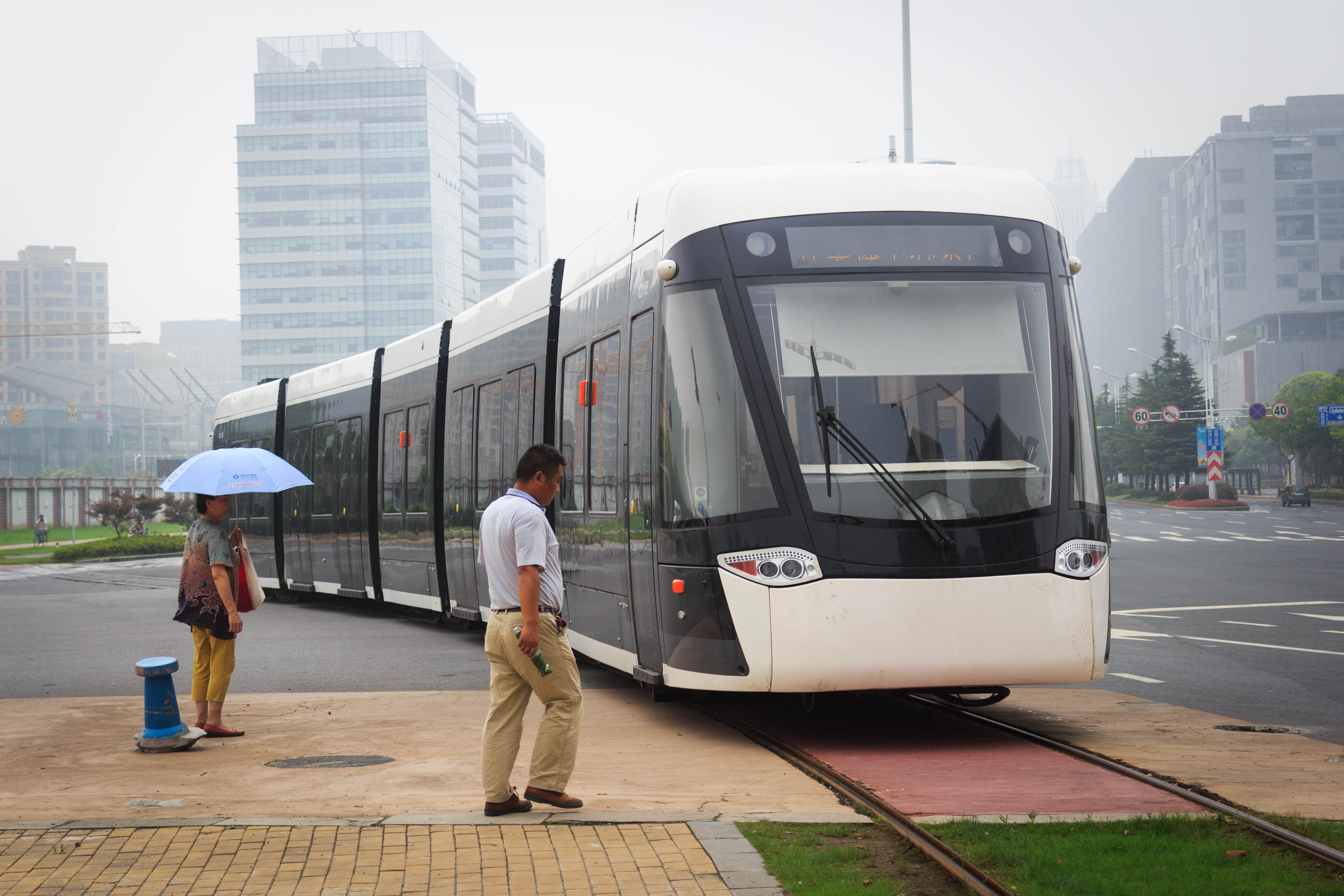
Nanjing Hexi Tram

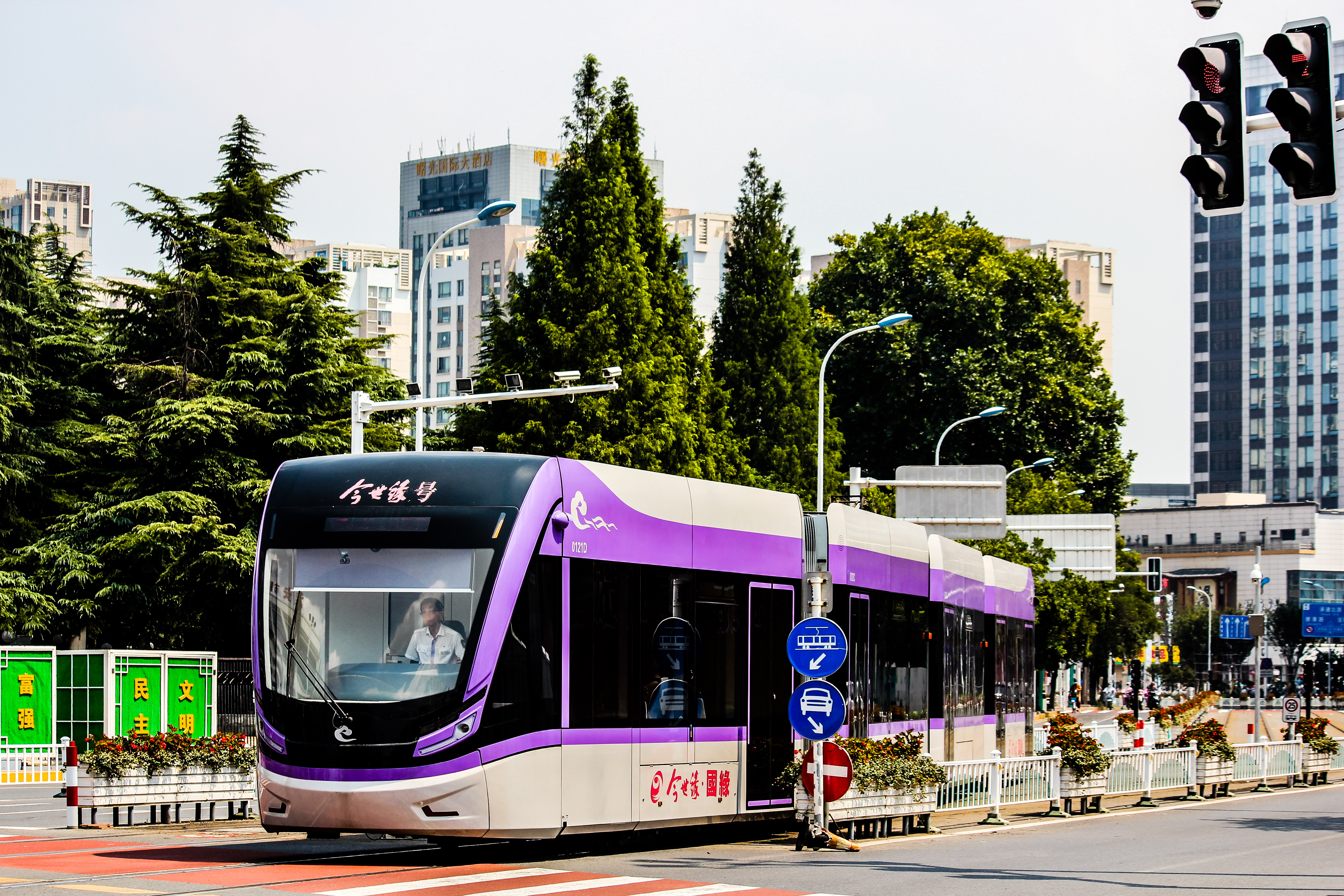
Huai'an Tram

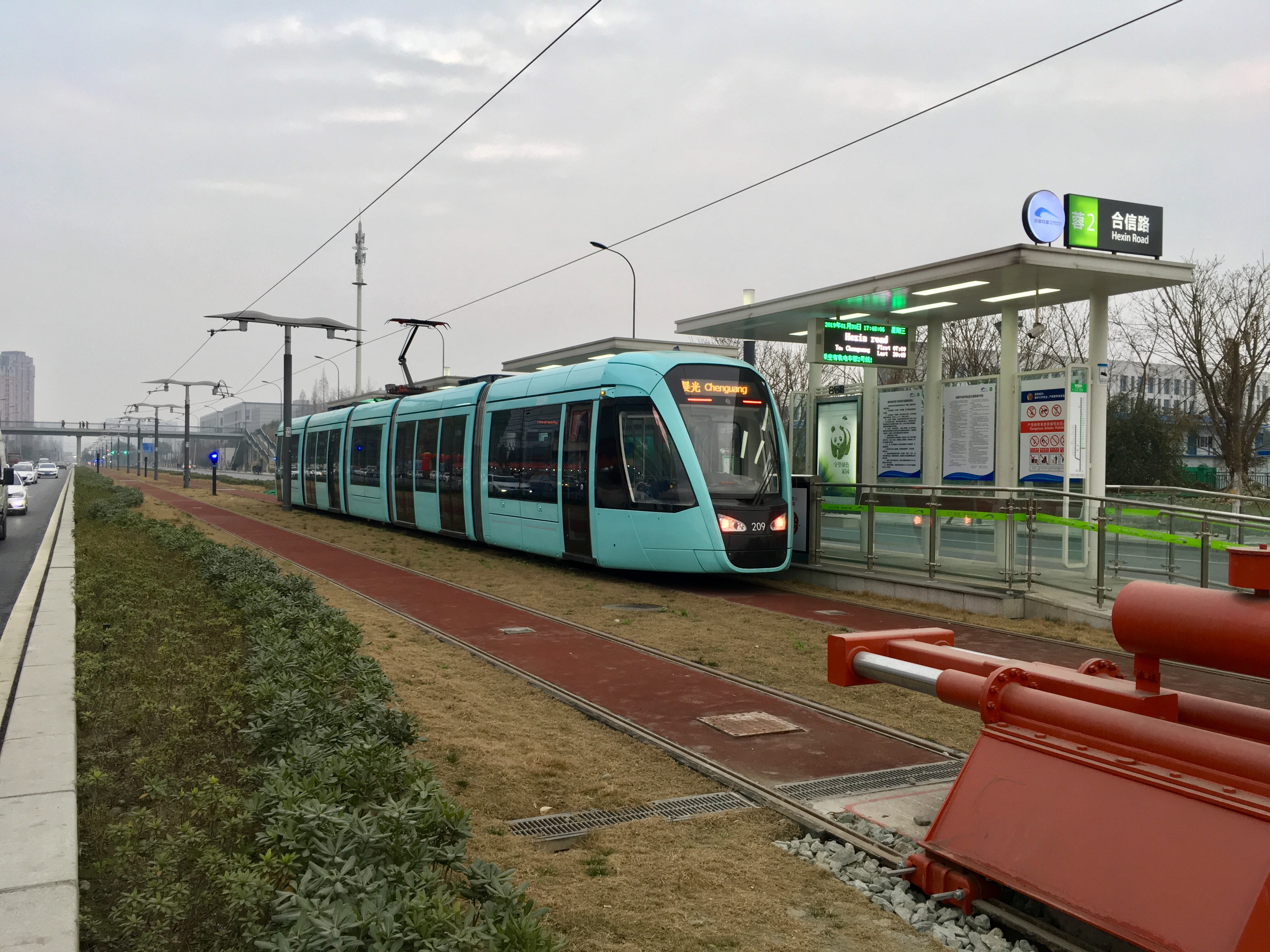
Chengdu Tram Line 2

== Light rail/Tram systems ==
Legend

- In operation.
- Under test run.
- Out of service

Lines
Line (not services)	System	Locale	Length	Stations	Opened
Xijiao line	Beijing Subway*	Beijing	08.8 km (5.5 mi)	6	2017-12-30
Yizhuang T1 line	Beijing Subway*	Beijing	11.9 km (7.4 mi)	14	2020-12-31
54	Changchun Tram	Changchun	07.6 km (4.7 mi)	16 (10 shared)	1941-11-01
55	Changchun Tram	Changchun	09.6 km (6.0 mi)	19 (10 shared)	1941-11-01
Line 3	Changchun Subway*	Changchun	31.9 km (19.8 mi)	32	2002-10-30
Line 2	Chengdu Metro*	Chengdu	39.3 km (24.4 mi)	35	2018-12-26
201	Dalian Tram	Dalian	11.6 km (7.2 mi)	18	1909-??-??
202	Dalian Tram	Dalian	12.6 km (7.8 mi)	19	1909-??-??
Line 1	Dujiangyan M-TR	Dujiangyan	17.3 km (10.7 mi)	17	2024-05-15
Line 2	Dujiangyan M-TR	Dujiangyan	17.3 km (10.7 mi)	13	2024-05-15
Gaoming Tram (TGM1)	Foshan Gaoming Tram	Foshan	6.57 km (4.08 mi)	10	2019-12-30
Nanhai Tram Line 1 (TNH1)	Foshan Nanhai Tram	Foshan	14.4 km (8.9 mi)	15	2021-08-18
Haizhu Tram (THZ1)	Guangzhou Modern Tram	Guangzhou	07.7 km (4.8 mi)	11	2014-12-31
Huangpu Tram Line 1	Guangzhou Modern Tram	Guangzhou	14.3 km (8.9 mi)	19	2020-07-01
5XX, 6XX, 7XX	MTR	Hong Kong	36.2 km (22.5 mi)	68	1988-09-18 (Note: Not part of China in 1988) (Note: 5XX and 6XX lines opened in 1988; 7XX lines opened in 1993 with the opening of the Tin Shui Wai Extension in three phases in 1993 (phases one and two) and 1995 (phase three) – phases four and five had since been opened in 2003.)
Hong Kong Tramways	Hong Kong Tramways	Hong Kong	30.0 km (18.6 mi)	120	1904-07-30 (Note: Not part of China in 1904)
Line 1	Honghe Modern Tram	Mengzi	13.3 km (8.3 mi)	15	2020-10-01
Line 1	Huai'an Modern Tram	Huai'an	20.0 km (12.4 mi)	23	2015-12-28
Line 1	Huangshi Tram	Huangshi	26.8 km (16.7 mi)	30	2021-12-30
Line 1	Jiaxing Tram	Jiaxing	11.2 km (7.0 mi)	12	2021-06-25
Hexi line	Nanjing Hexi Modern Tram	Nanjing	07.6 km (4.7 mi)	13	2014-08-01
Qilin line	Nanjing Qilin Modern Tram	Nanjing	08.9 km (5.5 mi)	13	2017-10-31
Chengyang line	Qingdao Modern Tram	Qingdao	08.7 km (5.4 mi)	12	2016-03-05
Line T1	Sanya Modern Tram	Sanya	8.37 km (5.20 mi)	15	2019-01-01
Line T1	Shanghai Songjiang Modern Tram	Shanghai			2019-08-10
Line T2	Shanghai Songjiang Modern Tram	Shanghai	13.9 km (8.6 mi)	20	2018-12-26
Line 1	Shenyang Hunnan Modern Tram	Shenyang	12.2 km (7.6 mi)	27 (17 shared)	2013-08-31
Line 2	Shenyang Hunnan Modern Tram	Shenyang	14.8 km (9.2 mi)	18 (12 shared)	2013-08-31
Line 3	Shenyang Hunnan Modern Tram	Shenyang	11.3 km (7.0 mi)	18 (5 shared)	2015-06-29
Line 4	Shenyang Hunnan Modern Tram	Shenyang			2019-01-05
Line 5	Shenyang Hunnan Modern Tram	Shenyang	21.4 km (13.3 mi)	25	2013-08-31
Line 6	Shenyang Hunnan Modern Tram	Shenyang			2019-01-05
Longhua line	Shenzhen Modern Tram	Shenzhen	11.7 km (7.3 mi)	20	2017-10-28
Line 1	Suzhou New District Modern Tram	Suzhou	25.7 km (16.0 mi)	15	2014-10-26
Line 2	Suzhou New District Modern Tram	Suzhou	18.6 km (11.6 mi)	13	2018-08-31
Line 1	Tianshui Tram	Tianshui	12.926 km (8.0 mi)	12	2020-05-01
Line 4	Wenshan Tram	Qiubei	13.96 km (8.7 mi)	10	2021-05-15
Line T1	Wuhan Auto-city Modern Tram	Wuhan	16.8 km (10.4 mi)	22	2017-07-28
Line T1	Wuhan Optics Valley Modern Tram	Wuhan	12.5 km (7.8 mi)	17 (3 shared)	2018-04-01
Line T2	Wuhan Optics Valley Modern Tram	Wuhan	19.2 km (11.9 mi)	25 (3 shared)	2018-04-01
Line 1	Wuyi Tram	Wuyi New Area (Nanping)	26.185 km (16.271 mi)	6	2022-01-01
Line 1	Zhuhai Modern Tram	Zhuhai	08.9 km (5.5 mi)	14	2017-06-13
Line 1	Shanghai Zhangjiang Modern Tram	Shanghai	09.8 km (6.1 mi)	15	2010-01-01
TEDA line	TEDA Modern Tram	Tianjin	07.8 km (4.8 mi)	14	2007-05-10

=== Under construction ===
- Baoshan
  - Baoshan Tram T1
- Chongqing
  - Tongliang Guided Rail Tram
- Delingha
  - Delingha Modern Tram
- Guangzhou
  - Huangpu Tram Line 2, Line 5
- Guiyang
  - Line T2
- Jiaxing
  - Tram T2
- Lijiang
  - Lijiang Tram Line 1
- Turpan
  - Turpan Tram
- Xi'an
  - Xi'an High-tech Zone Tram (西安高新区有轨电车)
- Zhangye
  - Zhangye Danxia Tram

=== Suspended ===
Lanzhou New Area planned a 5-line modern tram network but construction was halted in 2017 due to newly imposed restraints on borrowing.

=== Planned ===
- Nanjing
  - Nanjing Jiangxinzhou Tram (南京江心洲有轨电车)
- Tianjin (Xiqing Tram T2)
- Zhuzhou Tram (株洲有轨电车)

Lhasa, Haikou, Quanzhou, Zhengzhou, Kunshan, Baotou, Korla, Anshun, Hangzhou, Changzhou, Taizhou and Huangshan are planning tram networks for the future.

== See also ==
- Autonomous Rail Rapid Transit in China
- Urban rail transit in China
- Rail transport in China
- Passenger rail transport in China
- Hong Kong Tramways
