= Longhua station =

Longhua station may refer to:

- Longhua station (Shanghai Metro), a station on the Shanghai Metro in Shanghai
- Longhua station (Shenzhen Metro), a station on the Shenzhen Metro in Shenzhen, Guangdong
