= Qinghu station =

Metro station in Shenzhen, Guangdong, China

Qinghu 清湖
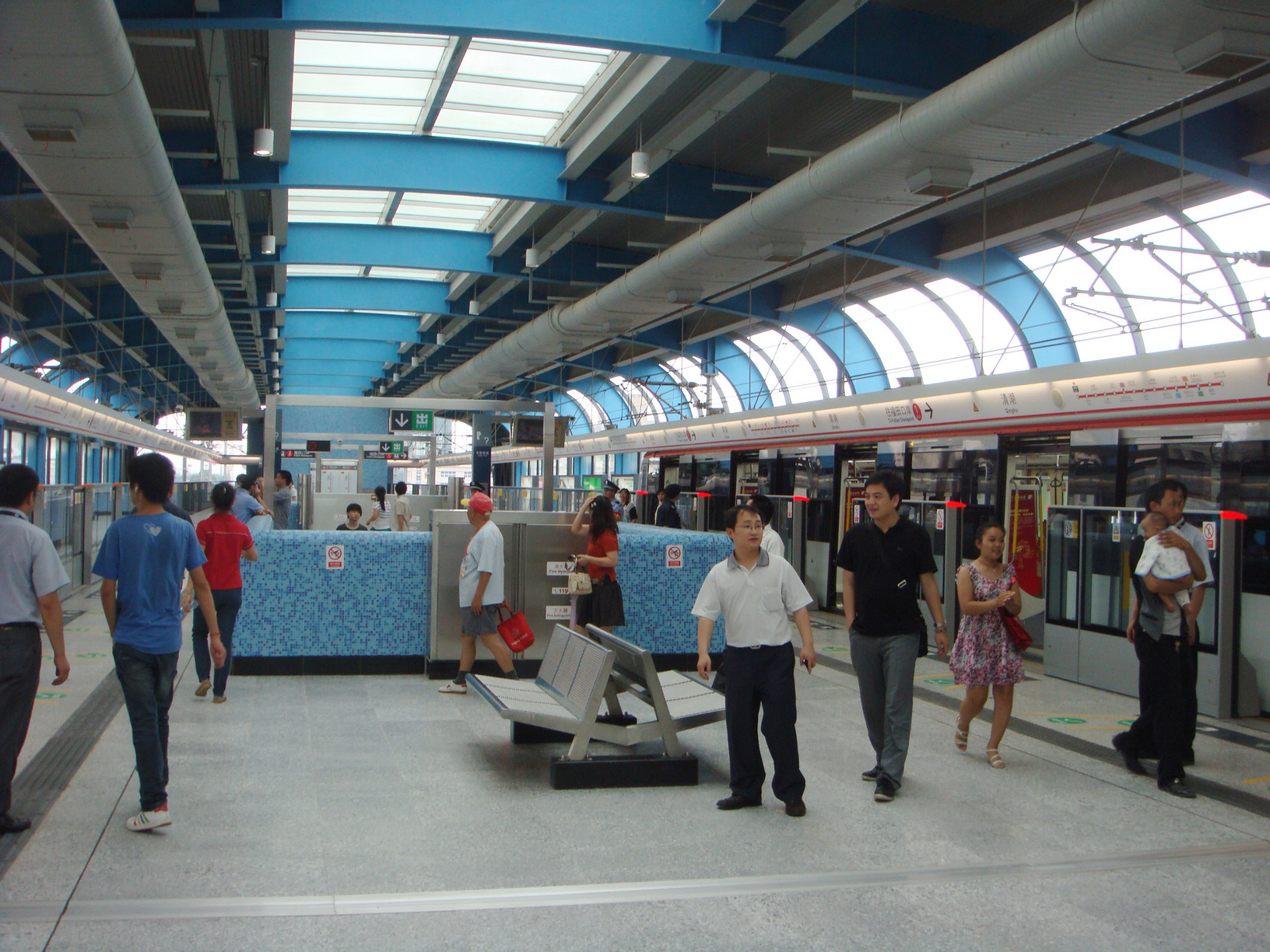
- Platform

General information
- Location: Longhua District, Shenzhen, Guangdong; China
- Coordinates: 22°39′50″N 114°2′11″E
- Operated by: MTR Corporation (Shenzhen); Shenzhen Tram
- Line: Line 4
- Platforms: 2 (1 island platform)
- Tracks: 2

Construction
- Structure type: Elevated
- Accessible: Yes

History
- Opened: 16 June 2011; 14 years ago

Services
Preceding station	Shenzhen Metro	Following station
Qinghu North towards Niuhu	Line 4	Longhua towards Futian Checkpoint
Track layout
Location

Qinghu station (Chinese: 清湖站; pinyin: Qīnghú Zhàn; Jyutping: cing1 wu4 zaam6; lit. 'Clear Lake station') is a station on Line 4 of the Shenzhen Metro and Lines 1 and 2 of the Shenzhen Tram. The station opened on 16 June 2011. It is located in Longhua District, Shenzhen, Guangdong Province, China. The station served as the terminus of Line 4 until 28 October 2020, when it was extended to Niuhu.

== Station layout ==
3F; Platforms	Platform 2	← Line 4 towards Futian Checkpoint (Longhua)
3F; Platforms	Island platform, doors will open on the left
3F; Platforms	Platform 1	→ Line 4 towards Niuhu (Qinghu North) →
2F; Concourse	Lobby	Customer Service, Shops, Vending machines, ATMs
G	-	Exit

== Exits ==
Exit	Destination
Exit A	Qinghu tram stop
Exit B	Qinghu tram stop, Ner Plum Garden
Exit C	365 Furnishing Plaza, Beautiful 365 Garden, Treasure Hotel
Exit D	Century Court, Lovely Villas, Yazun Club

== Gallery ==
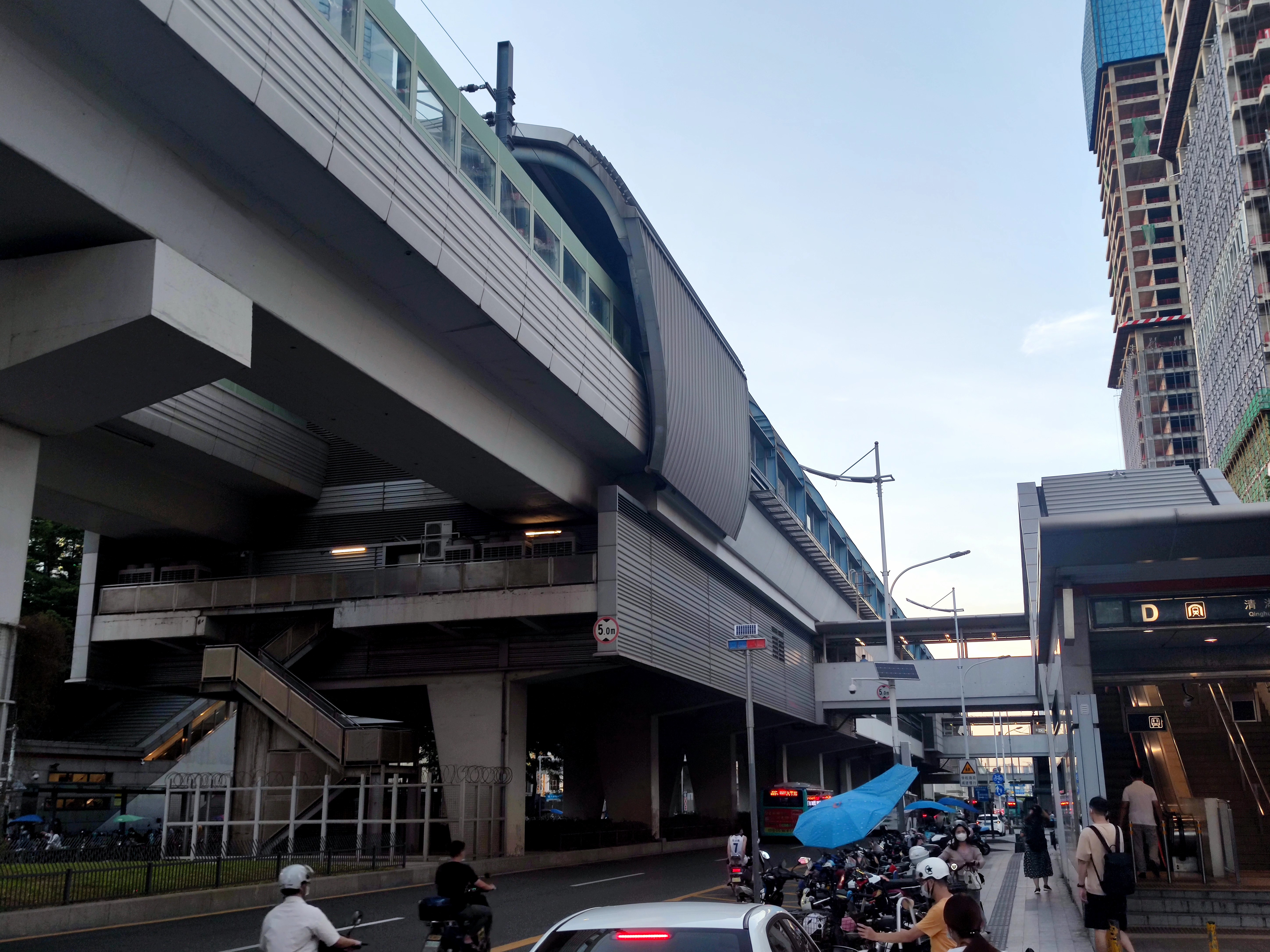
Exterior

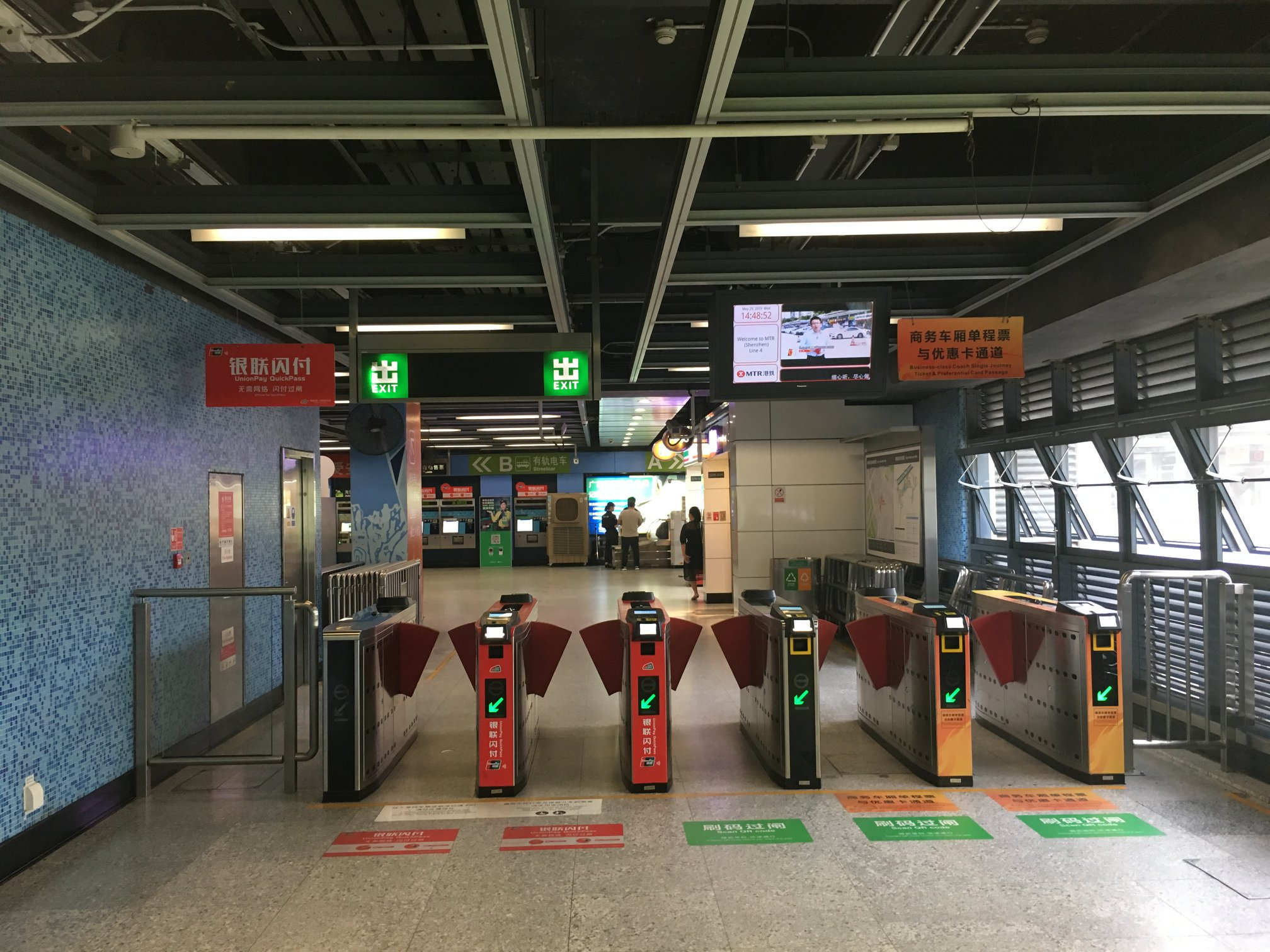
Concourse
