= Delingha railway station =

Railway station in Delingha, China

Delingha 德令哈
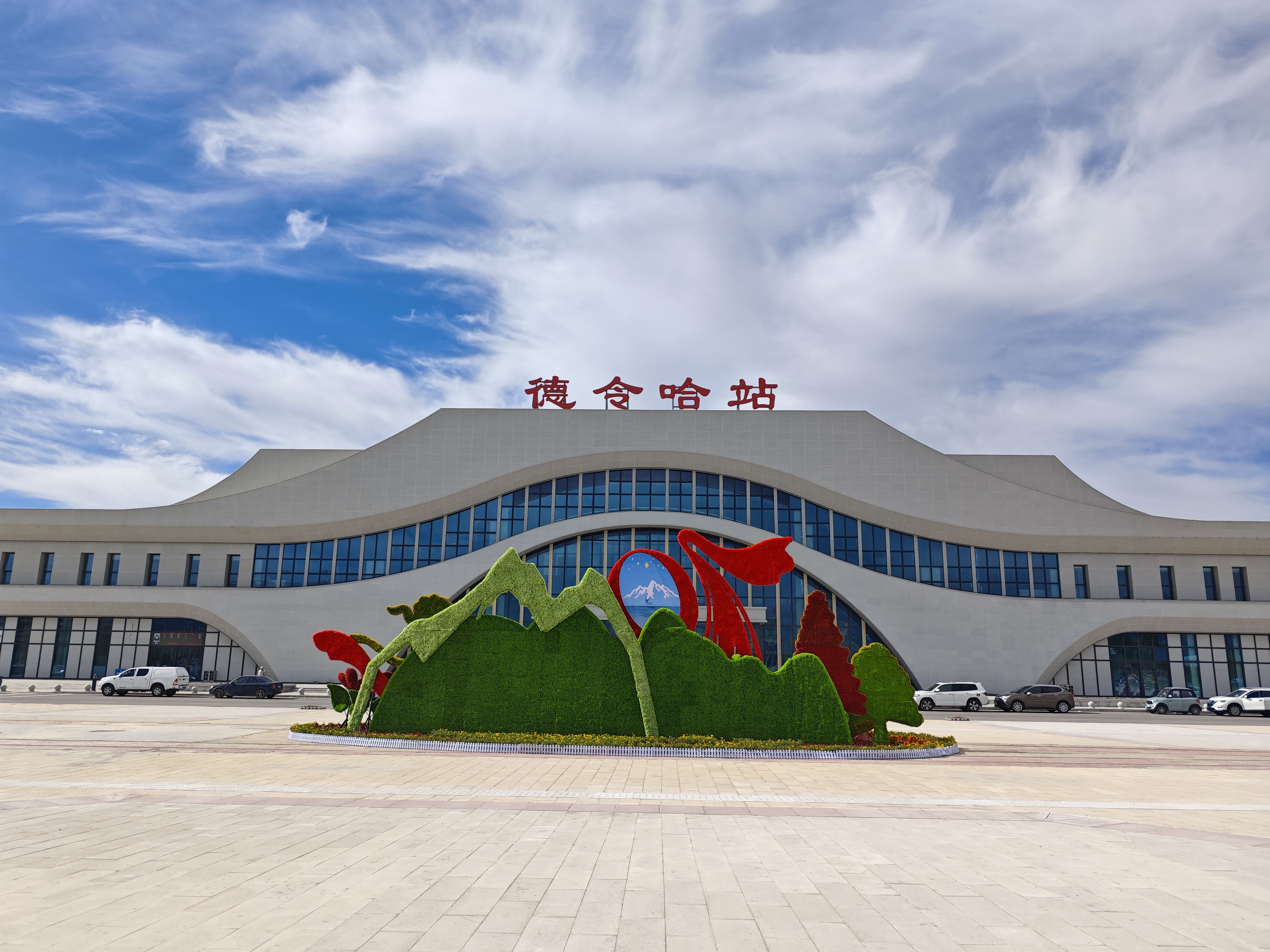
- Delingha Railway Station

General information
- Location: Delingha, Qinghai; China

History
- Opened: 1984
Location

Delingha railway station (Chinese: 德令哈站; pinyin: Délìnghā zhàn) is a station on the Chinese Qingzang Railway that serves Delingha, a city near the northwest edge of the Qinghai-Tibetan Plateau in Qinghai province, China.

As of 2022, the station was slated for renovation as part of a project for quality improvement of the Xining–Golmud segment of the Qinghai–Tibet Railway. The design of Delingha station was inspired by the landscape of the Kunlun Mountains and the Bayin River.

== See also ==
- Qingzang Railway
- List of stations on Qingzang railway

Preceding station	China Railway	Following station
Gahai towards Xining	Qinghai–Tibet railway	Denong towards Lhasa
