= Hedong Subdistrict, Delingha =

Hedong Subdistrict 河东街道 ᠭᠣᠣᠯ ᠤᠨ ᠡᠮᠦᠨᠡᠬ ᠵᠡᠭᠡᠯᠢ ᠭᠤᠳᠤᠮᠵᠢ
- Subdistrict
- Location in Qinghai
- Coordinates: 37°22′19″N 97°22′15″E
- Country: People's Republic of China
- Province: Qinghai
- Autonomous prefecture: Haixi
- County-level city: Delingha
- Village-level divisions: 4 residential communities 3 villages
- Elevation: 2,994 m (9,823 ft)
- Time zone: UTC+8 (China Standard)

Hedong Subdistrict (simplified Chinese: 河东街; traditional Chinese: 河東街; pinyin: Hédōng; lit. 'river east') Gool-un emünek (Mongolian: ᠭᠣᠣᠯ ᠤᠨ
ᠡᠮᠦᠨᠡᠬ ; Голын өмнөх) is one of the two subdistricts, the other being Hexi, of the city of Delingha, Qinghai, People's Republic of China. The seat of the Haixi Mongol and Tibetan Autonomous Prefecture is located here, and this is the more urbanised part of Delingha City. As of 2018, it has four residential communities (社区) and three villages under its administration.
