= Dalian Tram =

Tram system in Dalian, China

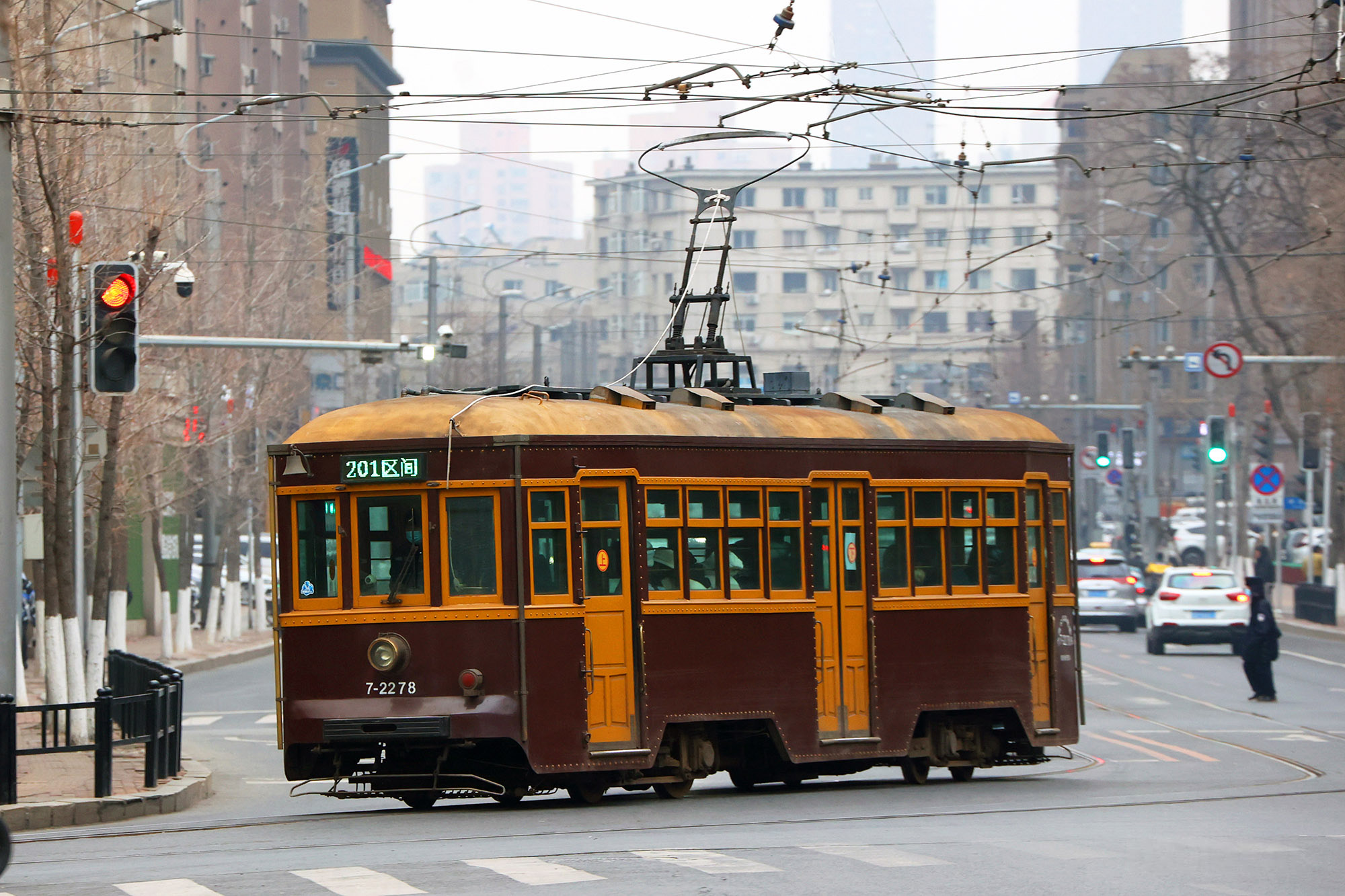
- A Dalian tram line 201 in January 2024

Overview
- Locale: Dalian, China
- Transit type: Tram
- Number of lines: 2
- Number of stations: 38

Operation
- Began operation: 25 September 1909; 117 years ago
- Character: street running and dedicated rights-of-way

Technical
- System length: 23.1 km (14.4 mi)
- Track gauge: Standard gauge 1,435 mm (4 ft 8 1/2 in)
- Electrification: 550 V DC Overhead line

Trams have been operating in Dalian continuously since 1909, making them one of the oldest tram systems still in use in mainland China. There were once eleven routes in operation in Dalian. Only two routes remain in use today (Route 201 and 202). There was a route 203 which currently merged into route 201. Notably, most of the staff on Dalian's tram system are female, such as the driver, conductor, points man—even the depot manager. The tram system was the only rail network in the city, until Dalian Metro opened in 2003.

== History ==
Trams in Dalian have a long history, stretching as far back as the late Qing dynasty. On September 25, 1909, the South Manchuria Railway opened the first tram line for testing in Dalian. The city at that time was under Japanese occupation. This was the first example of public transportation in the city, making Dalian one of the earliest mainland Chinese cities to have a public transport service. The original tram line ran from the Electrical Recreation Grounds (present-day Eton Place) to Tai Pier (now known as Harbour Bridge) via Taisho Road (present-day Zhongshan and Renmin Roads) spanning 2.45 kilometers (1.52 mi). There were thirty Type-11 tram cars in service at that time. The body of the Type-11 tram car was manufactured by Preston works in the United States whereas its chassis was manufactured by Montien Gibson Manufacturing in the United Kingdom. Its electrical components were manufactured in Germany. This type of tram car was built with a wooden body and two motorman's seats. It could carry 72 passengers per car in normal use and up to 145 at maximum capacity. At that time the Type-11 tram car was commonly known as the, "American large wooden cages." Later, new tram lines were added and two tram yards were built next to Minzhu Square and Jiefang Square. By 1945, a total of 11 tram routes, three premises, and two repair workshops were in operation.

In 1945, the Soviet Union Red Army defeated Japanese forces located in Manchuria and occupied Dalian near the end of World War II. On 1 April 1946, the Soviet Union Red Army requisitioned the Dalian Trams from the Dalian Urban Transport Co., Ltd., which was a subsidiary of the South Manchuria Railway, taking the responsibility of transport business in the Dalian area, and transformed the Dalian transport service into the Dalian City transportation company.

In the 1970s, due to urban development most of the tram lines were removed. At that time the No. 1 Tram line was abandoned and now the No. 15 bus line serves the route instead. At the end of the 20th century, Dalian city had only three tram routes: route No. 201, 202 and 203.

Between 15 October 1999 and 1 December 2002, route No. 202 was reformed. Some of the vehicles of type DL8000 retired and others were sold to Changchun city (now in operation as route No.54 of the Changchun Tram system). For the replacement of the DL8000 cars, the Tram Factory of Dalian Public Transport Group built type DL6W tram cars. From 10 June 2006 to 30 December 2007, route No. 201 and 203 were reformed and merged as the new route 201. Consequently, many tram cars were replaced with type DL6WA cars. Today 27 cars of type DL3000 built by the Japanese in the 1930s still remain and serve on the merged route 201 after retrofitting.

=== Historic overview ===
- 1909: electric trams started operating.
- 1945: the tramway network reached its maximum length, up to 11 routes.
- 1946: eight routes were closed step by step until 1979.
- 2002: some rolling stock was replaced by low floor trams.
- 30 December 2007: routes No. 201 and 203 were merged to form new route No. 201, with the rolling stock partly replaced by low floored trams.

== Tram routes ==
There are two tram routes operating as of 2018. Tram routes of Dalian are prefixed by 20. The tram network serves the down-town and south-western areas in the city. There used to exist a Line 203 which ran the eastern half of what is today Line 201 from Dalian Railway Station. Lines 201 and 203 was merged to create a larger Line 201, and now the modern 201 trams stop service at Huale Square (marked as 区间, which means services on only part of the route) and a free shuttle tram service will be running the rest part.

=== 201 – Haizhiyun Park – Xinggong Street (via Dalian Railway Station) ===
This route passes through busy residential areas:

Haizhiyun Park ↔ Jinguang East Coast ↔ Haichangxincheng ↔ Huale Square ↔ Chunhai Street ↔ Siergou ↔ Erqi Square ↔ Sanba Square ↔ Shiji Street ↔ Minzhu Square ↔ Minsheng Street ↔ Shengli Bridge ↔ Dalian railway station ↔ Dongguan Street ↔ Shichang Street ↔ Beijing Street ↔ Datong Street ↔ Wuyi Square ↔ Zhengong Street ↔ Xinggong Street

=== 202 – Xinggong Street – Xiaopingdao Qian ===
This route links the downtown area to the tourist spot of Xinghai Scenic Area, passing through Convention and Exhibition Center, Xinghai Square and Xinghai Park:

Xinggong Street ↔ Sunrise Shopping Center ↔ Jiefang Square ↔ Gongcheng Street ↔ Peace Plaza ↔ Convention and Exhibition Center ↔ Xinghai Square ↔ Research Institute of Chemical Physics ↔ The Second Affiliated Hospital of Dalian Medical University ↔ Xinghai Park ↔ Heishijiao ↔ Xueyuan Square Metro Station ↔ Dalian Maritime University ↔ Wanda Plaza ↔ Qixianling Metro Station ↔ China Hualu ↔ Qixianling ↔ Hekou ↔ Xiaopingdao Qian

== Practical Info ==
- Total length – 23.1 km (10.8 km on route 201, 12.3 km on route 202).
- Opened — September 1909.
- Fare – Route 201: RMB 1 or 2 in cash, 0.9 or 1.3 if paid with Mingzhu IC Card or China T-union cards.

Route 202: RMB 1 in cash, 0.95 if paid with Mingzhu IC Card or China T-union cards.

== Tickets ==
The Route 201 is divided into two zones delineated by the Dalian railway station: the western section is between Haizhiyun Park and Dalian railway station, and the eastern section is from Dalian railway station to Xinggong Street. The fare is 1 RMB if only one section (including riding on/off at Dalian railway station) is used. When riding both sections consecutively, the passenger needs to pay 1 RMB into the fare box in the car when embarking and a crew member collects another 1 RMB when at the Dalian railway station stop. If you use Dalian's contactless transit smart card, Mingzhu IC card, the fare is discounted to 0.9 RMB for one section and 1.3 RMB for riding both.

Route 202, after the initial full-line transformation of that route was complete in 2002, a single flat fare was applied for the whole line. The fare was 2 RMB before; however, the system had been changed and now the fare is 1 RMB. If you use Mingzhu IC card, the fare is discounted to 0.95 RMB. There are no ticket sales within the tram cars. It is necessary to pay the fare in cash or with a Mingzhu IC card when boarding.

== Fleet ==
The trams used a mixture of bow collectors and pantographs. The tram system in Dalian has used a variety of rolling stock though only two types remain in passenger operation:

Family	Sub-type	Type	Notes	No. in operation	Dates in operation	Image
DL3000	Original body	Single car tram	Developed from the basis of type 501 and 701, which was built by Mantetsu Shahekou Factory from 1935 to 1938. 26 (3000–3026) rebuilt from 501 and 701 type trams.	0	1930s-	
DL3000	DL4000	Single car tram	5 (4001–4005) rebuilt using the 501 and 701 type trams. They were eventually renumbered into DL3000 during the 1st overhaul. Features that defined them from the DL300 were all removed.		1930s–1997	
DL3000	1st major overhaul	Single car tram	A few non-overhauled vehicles were withdrawn after the introduction of the DL6W		1996–2007	
DL3000	2nd major overhaul	Single car tram	16 cars underwent the overhaul process.	14	2006–	
DL1000		Single car tram	Early vehicles were designated 'Victory'-type. Vehicles designated 1001–1035, with 1033 and 1034 being rebuilt using the Mantetsu 42 type and 1035 rebuilt using Mantetsu 41 type trams. These trams were also purchased by other cities.	0	1951–2004	
5000-series		Single car tram	12 were built as a complete body replacement of the Mantetsu 901 series.	0	1952–?	
6000-series		Single car tram	Allegedly 30 to 40 rebuilt on the basis of the American trams. 6003 and 6005 are rebuilt using Mantetsu 41 type streetcars.	0	?-1980s	
2000-series		Single car tram	5 were rebuilt either on the basis of type 11 American trams or type 1 trams (likely President’s Conference Car).		1960s-late 1990s	
DL2000		Single car tram	16–19 were built, possibly a rebuild of the DL1000 due to extreme similarities between the cars' exterior and bogies. 2001–2010 use chopper controls, while 2011–2018 use rheostat contact control system. 4–6 trams were overhauled from 2007 onwards All trams are stored at Beihekou depot.	0	1997–	
DL7000		Single car tram	One vehicle is retained as a departmental vehicle for anti-slip duties. Another vehicle is allegedly preserved in the Bus Repair Factory. Overhauled 2018.	1 (work car)		
DL621		Articulated tram	Numbered 621-01 to 621–15. Only 621-01 was upgraded to use IGBT controls and had a half pantograph, although the pantograph was later swapped for a bow collector due to issues with it.	0	1.4.1987-late 1990s	
DL8000		Single car tram	Withdrawn or sold to other cities. During their service, the trams worked on route 202. 30 were built First mass-produced vehicles of Dalian Tram Factory to use chopper controls.	0	15.11.1997–2005	
DL6W	DL6WA	70% low floor bi-articulate tram	Differs in specifications, with exterior remaining similar; 5 of various modifications are out of service, with one vehicle being withdrawn due to an airconditioner fire. The exterior resembles a Siemens Combino, although due to insufficient technologies, the trams couldn't be built as 100% low floor. DL6WB has stronger air conditioners. DL6WC has stronger air conditioners and AC motors.		17.5.2000–	
DL6W	DL6WB	70% low floor bi-articulate tram	Differs in specifications, with exterior remaining similar; 5 of various modifications are out of service, with one vehicle being withdrawn due to an airconditioner fire. The exterior resembles a Siemens Combino, although due to insufficient technologies, the trams couldn't be built as 100% low floor. DL6WB has stronger air conditioners. DL6WC has stronger air conditioners and AC motors.		20.4.2000–	
DL6W	DL6WC	70% low floor bi-articulate tram	Differs in specifications, with exterior remaining similar; 5 of various modifications are out of service, with one vehicle being withdrawn due to an airconditioner fire. The exterior resembles a Siemens Combino, although due to insufficient technologies, the trams couldn't be built as 100% low floor. DL6WB has stronger air conditioners. DL6WC has stronger air conditioners and AC motors.		1.5.2001–	
DL4W		Single car tram	The last single car tram ever made by Dalian Tram Factory. Built in the style of an old tram. Due to immature technologies such as underpowered motors, the tram was a failure. It has been withdrawn, but as no-one wants to scrap it, it has become a storeroom and a break room in the depot.	0	7.2004– sometime after 2006	
FG4		Articulate tram	Articulate tram ever made by CRRC Dalian. Based on Hitachi Sirio.	8	2021	

== Depots and termini ==
There are two depots: Beihekou depot and Minzhu Square depot.

The termini are – Haizhiyun Park, Huale Square, Xinggong Street, Heishijiao and Xiaopingdao Qian.

== Alignment and interchanges ==
Most tram routes are on unreserved tracks in the middle of the roads. Track beds on unreserved portions are laid on concrete. At some crossings, trolleybus lines cross tram lines. Recently, route 202 has been re-laid partly on reserved track, and at the side of the road. That route started running low floor trams, which also runs in unreserved portions and route 201.

Interchange with Dalian's light railway is possible at Dalian railway station.

Route 201 begins at Haizhiyun Park (however due to construction work at this site the line currently begins at Huale Square). The line runs along Huale Street, Luxun Road, Shiji Street, Changjiang Road to end at Xinggong Street, traveling through Erqi Square, Sanba Square, Minzhu Square, Shengli Bridge, Dalian railway station and Wuyi Square. DL3000-type vehicles, the tram for 27 Taiwan, in the 20th century, after 30 years of Japanese occupation during the production, were modified in 2007 (and thus some people model themselves after the word "reform" of the alphabet the first letter of the word "G", but actually this letter does not exist in models), and 15 sets of Dalian Tram Bus Group plant in 2007 – 2008 production of "Dalian" and brand DL6WA mixed-type articulated tram.

Route 202 begins at Xiaopingdao and runs along Huangpu Road, Zhongshan Road and Xi'an Road to end at Xinggong Street, traveling through Qixianling, Dalian Maritime University, Heishijiao, Xinghai Park, Xinghai Square and Jiefang Square, to the Xi'an Road commercial area. The line operates 40 trams of DL6WA type.

== See also ==
- Dalian Metro

=== Other Transport in China ===
- Trams in China
