= Longsheng station =

Metro station in Shenzhen, Guangdong, China

Coordinates: 22°38′42″N 114°0′46″E

Longsheng 龙胜
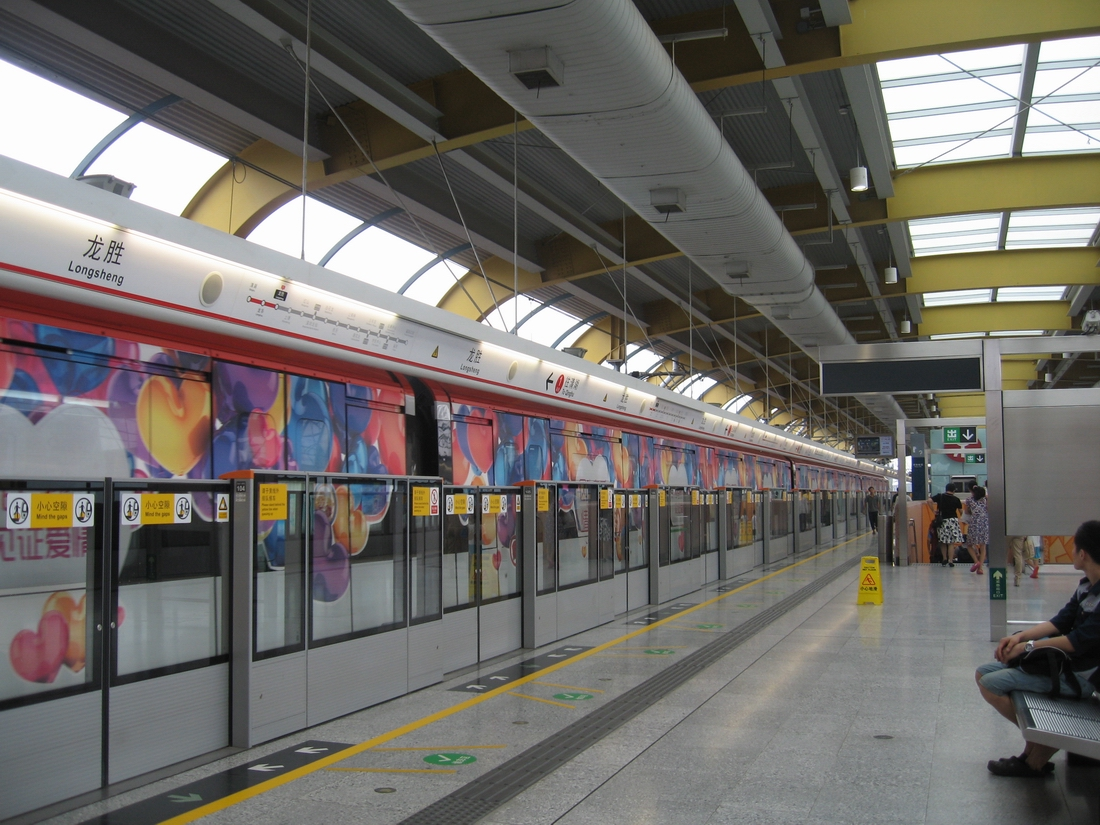

General information
- Location: Longhua District, Shenzhen, Guangdong; China
- Operated by: MTR Corporation (Shenzhen)
- Line: Line 4
- Platforms: 2 (1 island platform)
- Tracks: 2

Construction
- Structure type: Elevated
- Accessible: Yes

History
- Opened: 16 June 2011

Services
Preceding station	Shenzhen Metro	Following station
Longhua towards Niuhu	Line 4	Shangtang towards Futian Checkpoint
Location

Longsheng station (simplified Chinese: 龙胜站; traditional Chinese: 龍勝站; pinyin: Lóngshèng Zhàn; Jyutping: lung4 sing3 zaam6) is a station on Line 4 of the Shenzhen Metro. The station opened on 16 June 2011. It is located on Heping Road in Longhua District, Shenzhen.

== Station layout ==
3F; Platforms	Platform 2	← Line 4 towards Futian Checkpoint (Shangtang)
3F; Platforms	Island platform, doors will open on the left
3F; Platforms	Platform 1	→ Line 4 towards Niuhu (Longhua) →
2F; Concourse	Lobby	Customer Service, Shops, Vending machines, ATMs
G	-	Exit

== Exits ==
Exit	Destination
Exit B	Guotai Furniture Plaza, Yuegang Furniture Plaza, Shangtang Police Station
Exit C	MTR (Shenzhen) Headquarters, Longsheng Depot, Longsheng General Service Building
