= Shenzhen Tram =

Tram system in Shenzhen, China

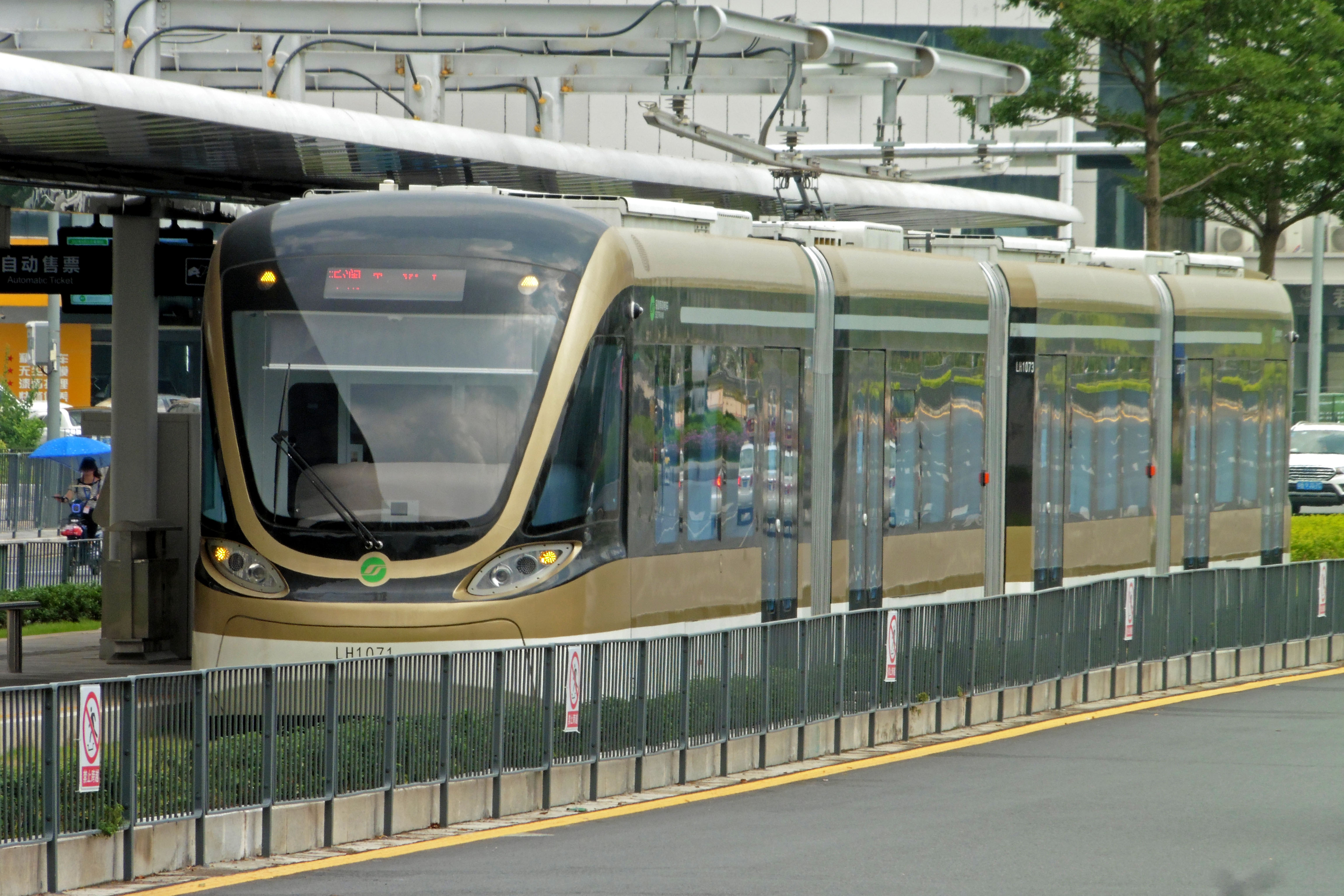

Overview
- Locale: Shenzhen, China
- Transit type: Tram
- Number of lines: 2
- Number of stations: 21
- Website: http://www.szlhtram.com

Operation
- Began operation: 28 October 2017; 9 years ago
- Operator: Shenzhen Metro

Technical
- System length: 11.7 km (7.3 mi)

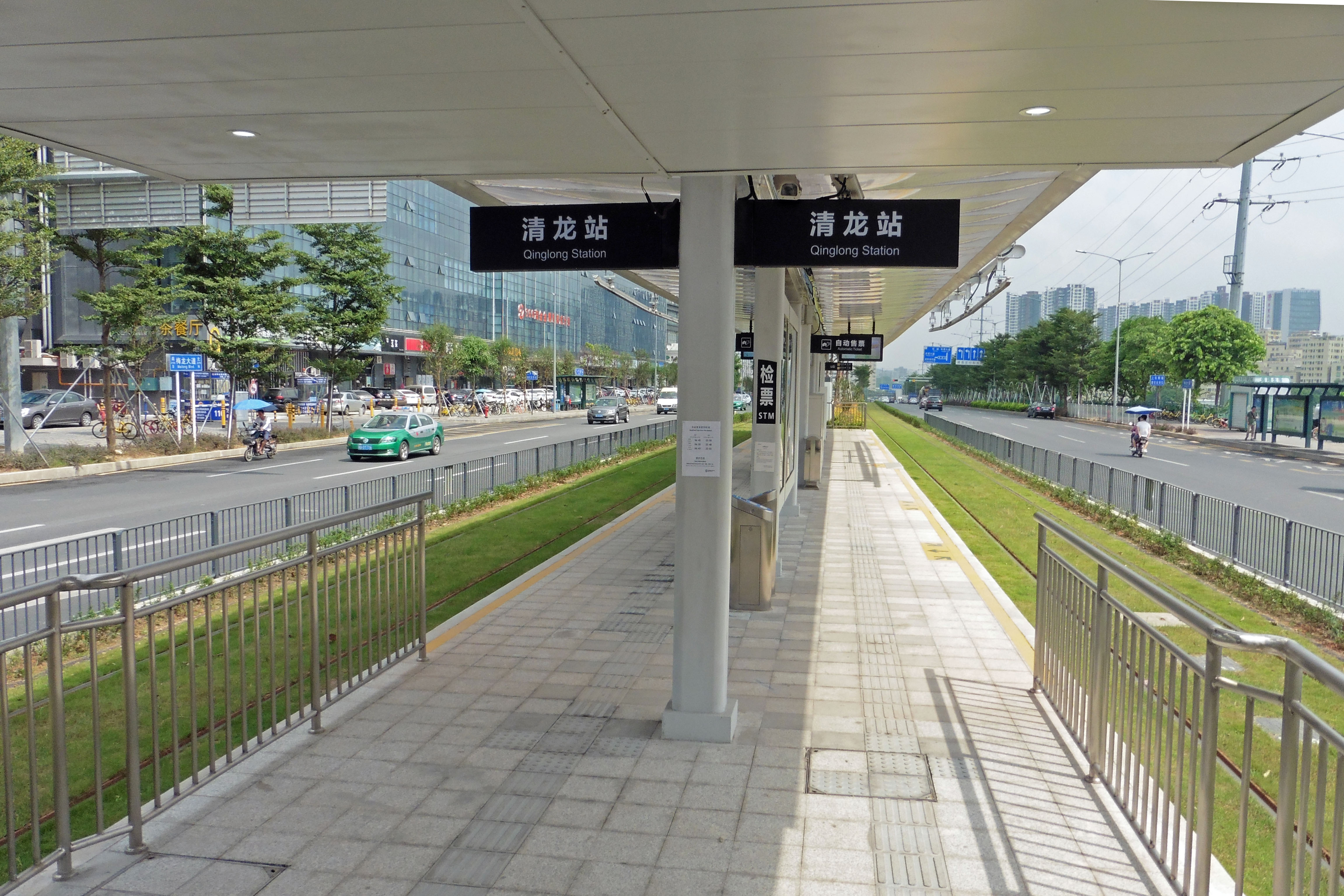
Qinglong tram stop

Shenzhen Tram is a light rail system consisting of two (formerly three) tram routes in Longhua District, Shenzhen, Guangdong, China. Construction commenced on 27 December 2013 and public testing started on 30 June 2017, with the system fully opening on 28 October 2017. The tram system integrates the north side of Longhua into the city's rail network and is expected to significantly ease commuting difficulties.

== History ==
The initial system consists of 11.7 km (7.3 mi) and three lines. The tram links Qinghu Station on Line 4 of the Shenzhen Metro with central Guanlan, with service to Longhua areas including Automobile Industry City, Guanlan Strategic New Industries Park and the Science and Technology Service Center. It will eventually connect with Shenzhen Metro Line 4 at Xinlan Station. There are 21 stations, constructed at a cost of about 1.38 billion yuan (US$226 million). It is expected to help residents commute and relieve traffic congestion in the local area. A 3.8-kilometre (2.4 mi) spur links Guanlan New Industry Park with Dahe Road. The spur is expected to cost 218 million yuan.

== Lines ==
There are 2 lines in operation; line 1 (Qinghu – Xiawei) and Line 2 (Qinghu – Xinlan). Lines 1 and 2 share tracks between Qinghu and Dahe, where they branch off. Line 3 formerly connected Xiawei with Xinlan, passengers travelling between Xiawei and Xinlan are now required to transfer at Dahe for a connection.

Services formerly ran at a 20-minute frequency on each of Line 1, Line 2 and Line 3 with the parallel section between Qinghu and Dahe receiving a 10-minute frequency. To meet demand, services on Line 3 were withdrawn on 27 December 2017, and a 12-minute frequency was provided on Line 1 and Line 2, with a 6-minute frequency on the parallel section as these flows accounted for 94% of the demand. This provided an 87% increase in transport capacity. From 28 June 2018, an 8-minute frequency is applied on Line 1 and Line 2, with a 4-minute interval on the parallel section to meet increasing demand during peak hours. To meet the desired density, all the trams are put into service, the first in railway transport industry.

- Line 1: Qinghu – Xiawei. 8.6 km.
- Line 2: Qinghu – Xinlan. 6.8 km.

== Rolling stock ==
Rolling stock consists of 4 section trams constructed by CRRC Zhuzhou Locomotive, using technology from Siemens. The system does not use overhead wires, with trams recharging an onboard capacitor from fixed power bars above the tracks at each stop.

== Discussion ==
Zhao Pinglin, deputy director of Shenzhen Rail Construction Headquarters, said tram systems have shorter, cheaper construction periods than metro and light rail. Modern tram systems also have lower energy consumption, more flexibility and quieter operations, Zhao said. Longhua is planning three tram lines totaling 51 kilometers. Construction of metro projects can take four to five years and cost 600–700 million yuan per kilometer, while tram lines can cost about 100 million yuan per kilometer and be used for 30 years. The tram has been criticized for roughly following the path of the north extension of Shenzhen Metro Line 4 rendering the project redundant. However, given that the goal of the tram project was to improve short distance transport and serve as a feeder line to the metro, the tram project will complement the Metro extension rather than compete with it.
