= Longhua station (Shenzhen Metro) =

Metro station in Shenzhen, China

Coordinates: 22°39′6″N 114°1′21″E

Longhua 龙华
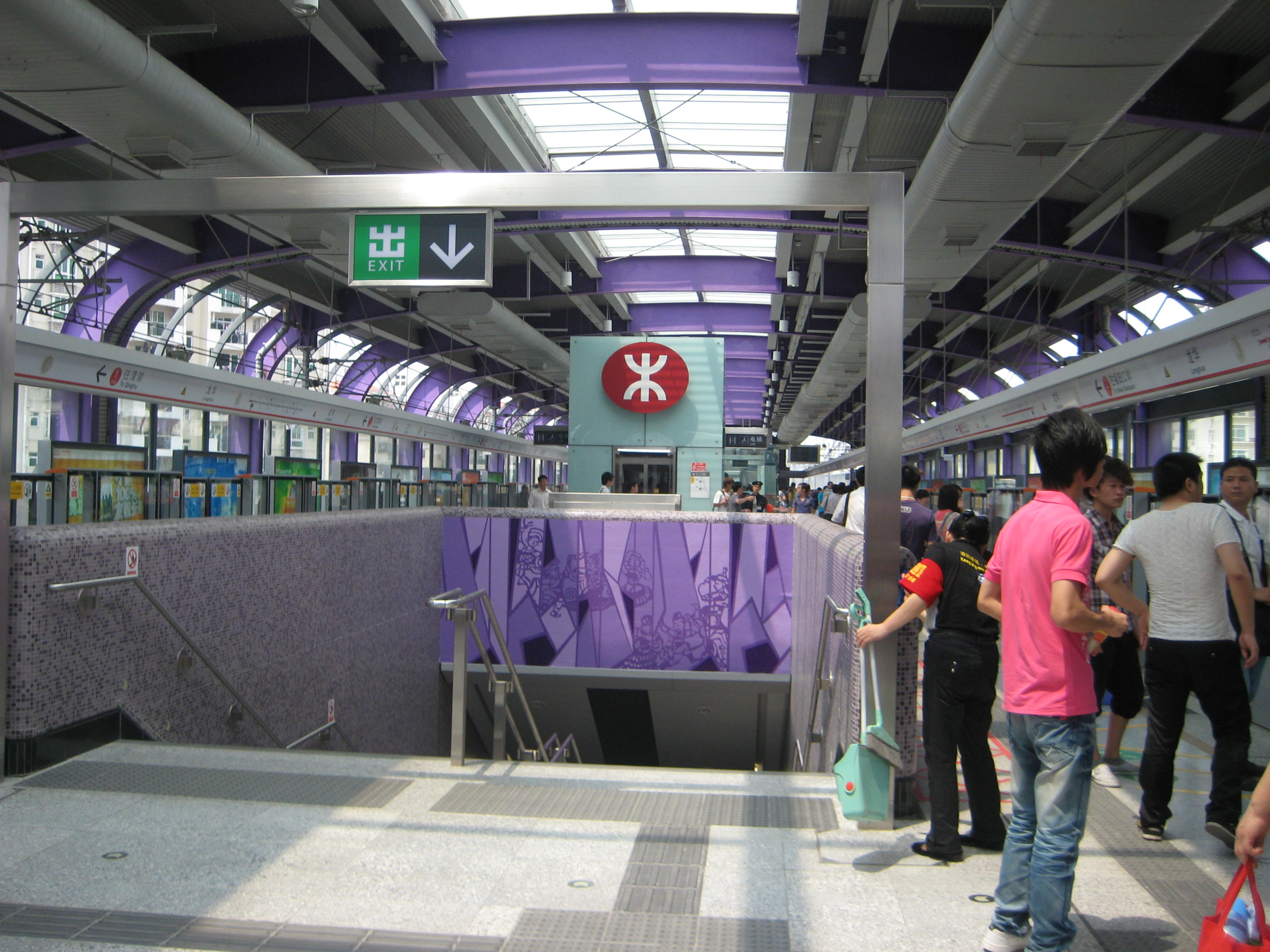

General information
- Location: Longhua District, Shenzhen, Guangdong; China
- Operator: MTR Corporation (Shenzhen)
- Line: Line 4
- Platforms: 2 (1 island platform)
- Tracks: 2

Construction
- Structure type: Elevated
- Accessible: Yes

History
- Opened: 16 June 2011

Services
Preceding station	Shenzhen Metro	Following station
Qinghu towards Niuhu	Line 4	Longsheng towards Futian Checkpoint
Location

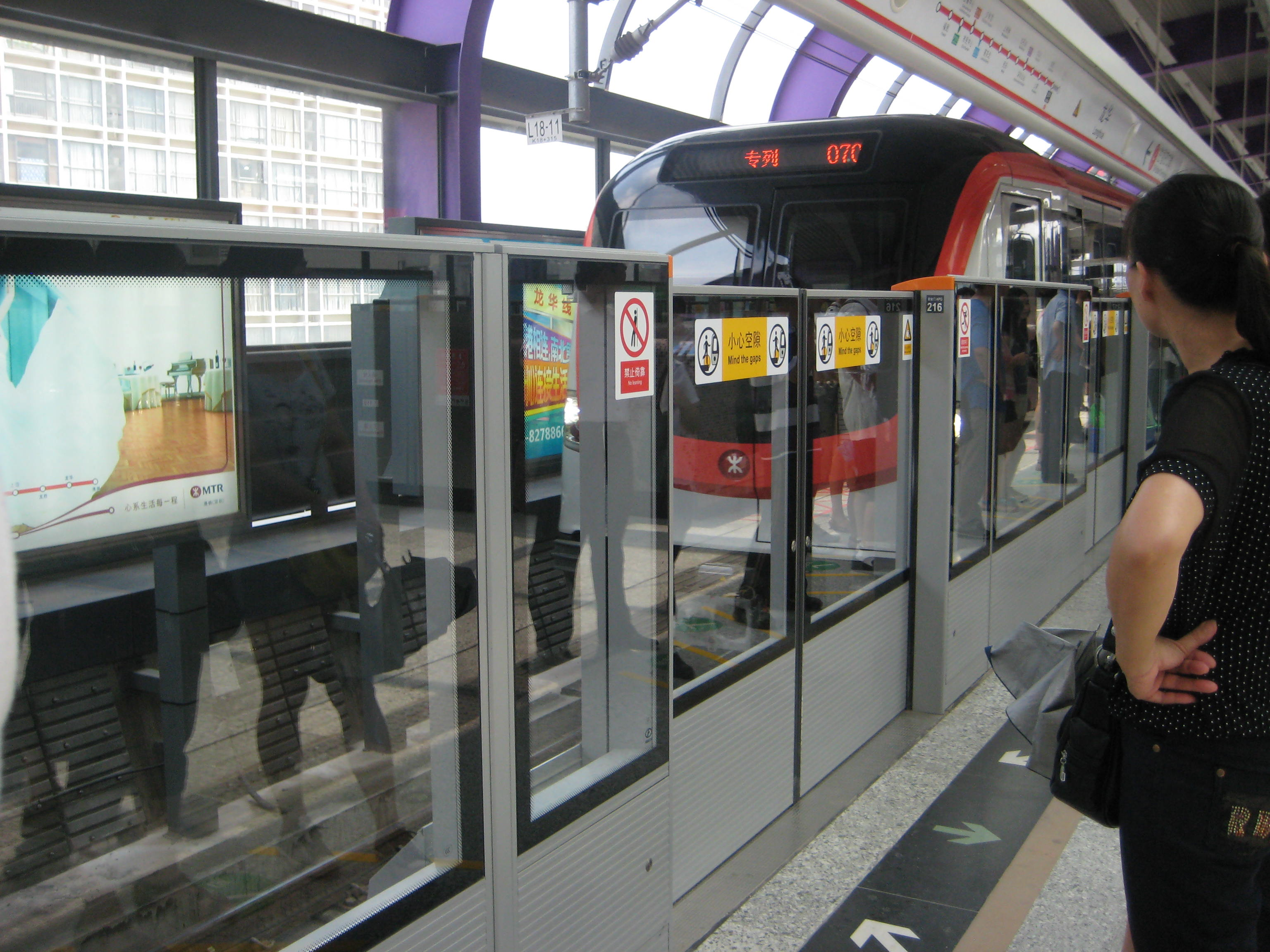
Metro arriving at Longhua Station

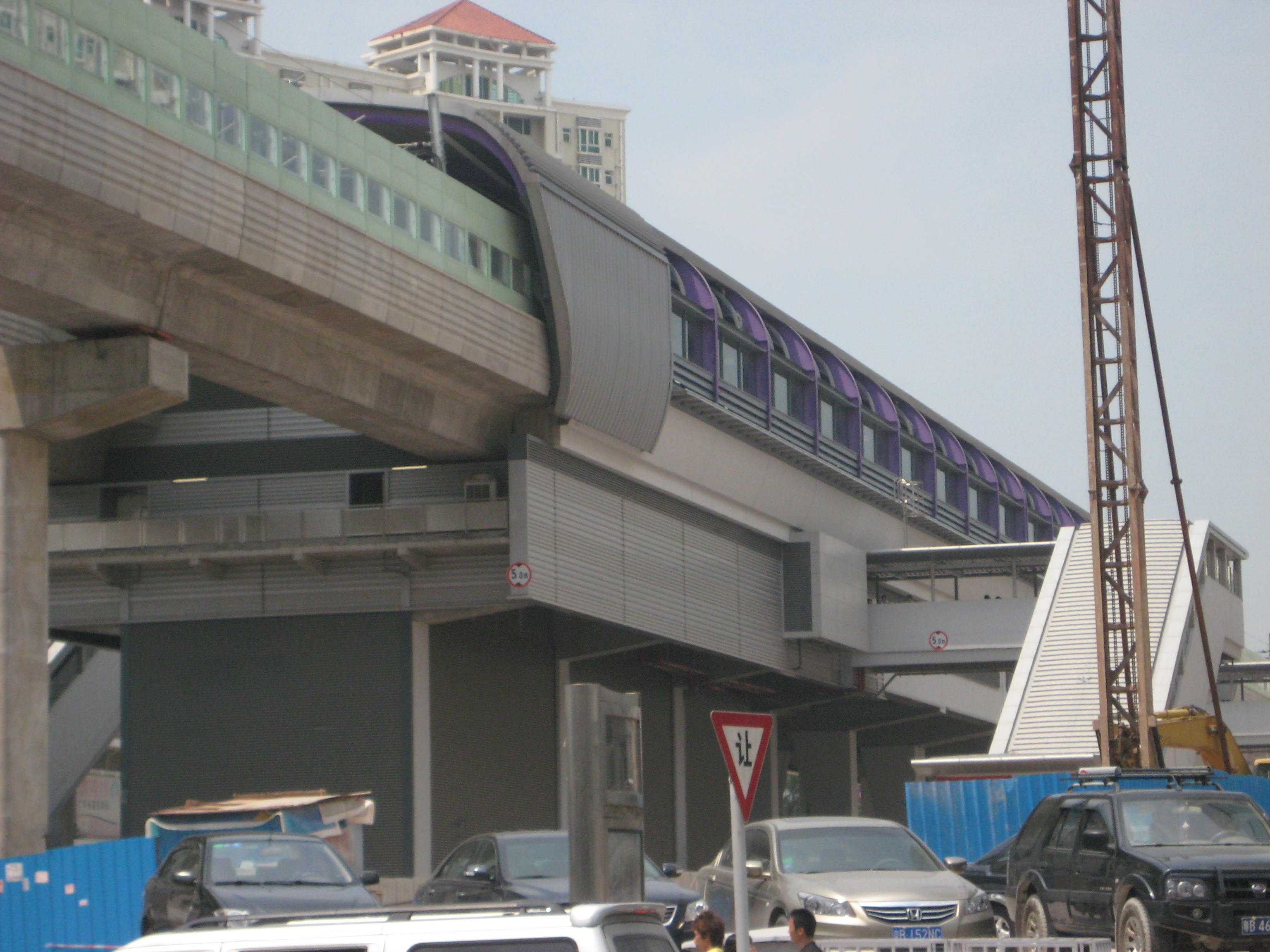
External view

Longhua station (simplified Chinese: 龙华站; traditional Chinese: 龍華站; pinyin: Lónghuá Zhàn; Jyutping: lung4 waa4 zaam6) is a station on Line 4 of the Shenzhen Metro. It opened on 16 June 2011. Line 4 was formerly named after this station (as the Longhua Line).

== Station layout ==
3F; Platforms	Platform 2	← Line 4 towards Futian Checkpoint (Longsheng)
3F; Platforms	Island platform, doors will open on the left
3F; Platforms	Platform 1	→ Line 4 towards Niuhu (Qinghu) →
2F; Concourse	Lobby	Customer Service, Shops, Vending machines, ATMs
G	-	Exit

== Exits ==
Exit	Destination
Exit A	China Telecom Building, Huayu Garden, Huafu General Market, Huafu Market Bus Stop
Exit B	Longpeng Building, AAA Building, Jiahua Shopping Mall, Yoyi Book, Vanguard, Longhua Tax Office, Longhua Street Talent and personnel Service Center, Longhua Sub-District, Kins Par Hotel, Longhua Local Taxation Bus Stop, Longhua Sub-District Office Bus Stop
Exit C	Beautiful AAA Garden, Qingnian Chengbang Garden, Longhua Business Center Shopping Plaza, 7 Days Inn
Exit D	Futong Tianjun, Daxin Garden, Jinyongge, Jinbi Shijia, A. Best
