= Delingha =

Delingha 德令哈市 · ᠳᠡᠯᠡᠬᠡᠢ ᠬᠣᠲᠠ · གཏེར་ལེན་ཁ་གྲོང་ཁྱེར།
- County-level city
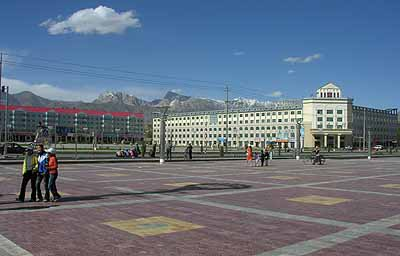

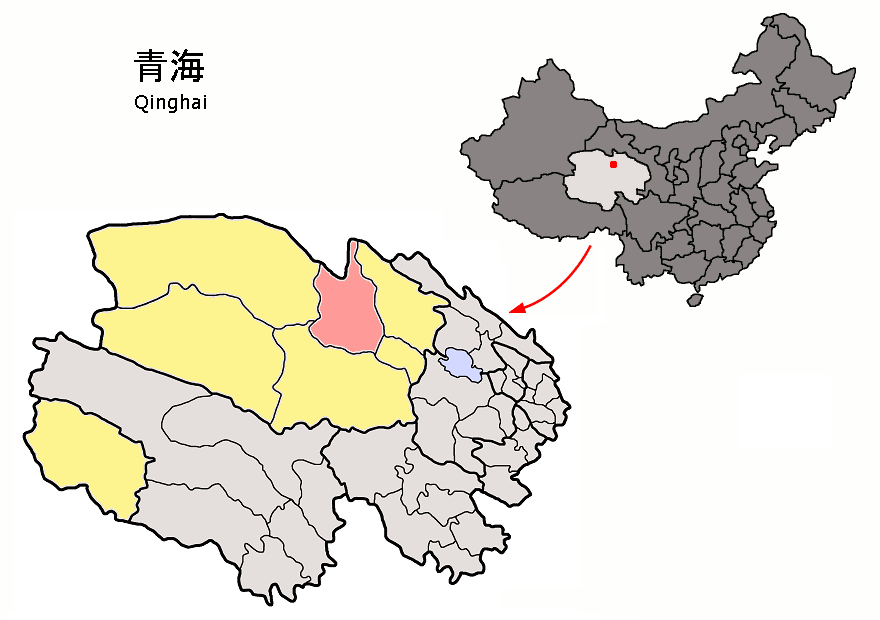
- Location of Delingha City (red) within Haixi Prefecture (yellow) and Qinghai

- Location of the city centre in Qinghai
- Coordinates (Delingha municipal government): 37°22′12″N 97°21′41″E
- Country: China
- Province: Qinghai
- Autonomous prefecture: Haixi
- Municipal seat: Hexi Subdistrict

Area
  - Total: 27,700 km^{2} (10,700 sq mi)
- Elevation: 2,982 m (9,783 ft)

Population (2020)
  - Total: 88,227
  - Density: 3.19/km^{2} (8.25/sq mi)
- Time zone: UTC+8 (China Standard)
- Postal code: 817000
- Area code: 0977
- Website: www.delingha.gov.cn

Delingha

Chinese name
- Chinese: 德令哈市
Transcriptions
Standard Mandarin
- Hanyu Pinyin: Délìnghā Shì

Tibetan name
- Tibetan: གཏེར་ལིན་ཁ་གྲོང་ཁྱེར།
Transcriptions
- Wylie: gter lin kha grong khyer
- Tibetan Pinyin: Dêrlinka Chongkyêr

Mongolian name
- Mongolian script: ᠳᠡᠯᠡᠬᠡᠢ ᠬᠣᠲᠠ
Transcriptions
- SASM/GNC: Delhi hot

Delingha (Chinese: 德令哈; Tibetan: གཏེར་ལིན་ཁ།), or Delhi (Mongolian: ᠳᠡᠯᠡᠬᠡᠢ ᠬᠣᠲᠠ), is the seat of the Haixi Mongol and Tibetan Autonomous Prefecture in northern Qinghai province, China. It is located approximately 200 km (120 mi) southeast of the Da Qaidam Administrative Region. It is a mainly industrial county-level city. The Bayin River divides the city into two parts: Hedong and Hexi. Because the prefecture seat is located in Hedong, it is slightly more flourishing than Hexi, which is chiefly agricultural.

Established in 1988, Delingha administers seven township-level divisions covering an area of 27,700 km^{2} (10,700 sq mi) and has a total population of 78,184, making it the smallest of the five cities in Qinghai. The name of the city comes from Mongolian and means "golden world" (ᠠᠯᠲᠠᠨ ᠳᠡᠯᠡᠬᠡᠢ), reflecting the relatively large Mongol population of the city. Da Qaidam administrative zone merged into Delingha in mid-2018.

== Administrative divisions ==
Delingha is divided into 3 subdistricts, 3 towns, and 1 township.

Name	Simplified Chinese	Hanyu Pinyin	Tibetan	Wylie	Mongolian (traditional script)	Mongolian (Cyrillic)	Administrative division code
Subdistricts
Hexi Subdistrict	河西街道	Héxī Jiēdào	ཆུ་ནུབ་སྲང་ལམ།	chu nub srang lam	ᠭᠣᠣᠯ ᠤᠨ ᠬᠣᠢᠨᠠᠬᠢ ᠵᠡᠭᠡᠯᠢ ᠭᠤᠳᠤᠮᠵᠢ	Голын хойнох зээл гудамж	632802001
Hedong Subdistrict	河东街道	Hédōng Jiēdào	ཆུ་ཤར་སྲང་ལམ།	chu shar srang lam	ᠭᠣᠣᠯ ᠤᠨ ᠡᠮᠦᠨᠡᠬᠢ ᠵᠡᠭᠡᠯᠢ ᠭᠤᠳᠤᠮᠵᠢ	Голын өмнөх зээл гудамж	632802002
Railway Station Subdistrict	火车站街道	Huǒchēzhàn Jiēdào	མེ་འགོར་ས་ཚུགས་སྲང་ལམ།	me 'gor sa tshugs srang lam	ᠭᠠᠯᠲᠤ ᠲᠡᠷᠭᠡᠨ ᠥᠷᠲᠡᠭᠡᠨ ᠦ ᠵᠡᠭᠡᠯᠢ ᠭᠤᠳᠤᠮᠵᠢ	Галт тэргэн өртөөний зээл гудамж	632802003
Towns
Gahai Town	尕海镇	Gǎhǎi Zhèn	ཀ་ཧྭའེ་གྲོང་རྡལ།	ka hwa'e grong rdal	ᠪᠠᠭᠠᠬᠤᠨᠠᠭᠤᠷ ᠪᠠᠯᠭᠠᠰᠤᠨ	Бааахнуур балгас	632802100
Hoit Taria Town	怀头他拉镇	Huáitóutālā Zhèn	ཧྭའེ་ཐིག་ཐ་ལ་གྲོང་རྡལ།	hwa'e thig tha la grong rdal	ᠬᠣᠢᠲᠤᠲᠠᠷᠢᠶ᠎ᠠ ᠪᠠᠯᠭᠠᠰᠤᠨ	Хойтдаариа балгас	632802101
Hurleg Town	柯鲁柯镇	Kēlǔkē Zhèn	ཁི་ལུའུ་ཁི་གྲོང་རྡལ།	khi lu'u khi grong rdal	ᠬᠥᠷᠯᠥᠩ ᠪᠠᠯᠭᠠᠰᠤᠨ	Хэрлон балгас	632802102
Township
Suj Township	蓄集乡	Xùjí Xiāng	ཕྱུགས་སྐྱིལ་ཡུལ་ཚོ།	phyugs skyil yul tsho	ᠰᠦᠵᠢ ᠰᠤᠮᠤᠨ	Сүж суман	632802200

== Geography ==
=== Climate ===
Delingha has a cool semi-arid climate (Köppen BSk) just moist enough to avoid being a cool arid climate (BWk), characterised by warm summers with moderate rainfall and frigid to freezing, dry winters.

Climate data for Delingha, elevation 2,982 m (9,783 ft), (1991–2020 normals, extremes 1971–2010)
Month	Jan	Feb	Mar	Apr	May	Jun	Jul	Aug	Sep	Oct	Nov	Dec	Year
Record high °C (°F)	9.6 (49.3)	12.3 (54.1)	18.9 (66.0)	27.4 (81.3)	29.3 (84.7)	29.4 (84.9)	34.7 (94.5)	34.2 (93.6)	31.7 (89.1)	22.4 (72.3)	14.6 (58.3)	8.4 (47.1)	34.7 (94.5)
Mean daily maximum °C (°F)	−2.4 (27.7)	2.3 (36.1)	7.9 (46.2)	14.1 (57.4)	18.2 (64.8)	21.2 (70.2)	23.7 (74.7)	23.6 (74.5)	19.1 (66.4)	12.2 (54.0)	4.7 (40.5)	−0.9 (30.4)	12.0 (53.6)
Daily mean °C (°F)	−9.8 (14.4)	−5.2 (22.6)	0.4 (32.7)	6.8 (44.2)	11.4 (52.5)	14.8 (58.6)	17.2 (63.0)	16.8 (62.2)	12.0 (53.6)	4.4 (39.9)	−3.0 (26.6)	−8.6 (16.5)	4.8 (40.6)
Mean daily minimum °C (°F)	−15.3 (4.5)	−11.0 (12.2)	−5.7 (21.7)	0.1 (32.2)	5.1 (41.2)	9.3 (48.7)	11.8 (53.2)	11.4 (52.5)	6.5 (43.7)	−1.3 (29.7)	−8.3 (17.1)	−13.9 (7.0)	−0.9 (30.3)
Record low °C (°F)	−30.9 (−23.6)	−32.4 (−26.3)	−21.3 (−6.3)	−10.9 (12.4)	−7.4 (18.7)	−2.5 (27.5)	0.5 (32.9)	−0.9 (30.4)	−8.9 (16.0)	−14.2 (6.4)	−20.3 (−4.5)	−28.4 (−19.1)	−32.4 (−26.3)
Average precipitation mm (inches)	4.9 (0.19)	3.8 (0.15)	6.2 (0.24)	6.4 (0.25)	26.2 (1.03)	45.9 (1.81)	51.7 (2.04)	39.1 (1.54)	24.1 (0.95)	6.1 (0.24)	2.9 (0.11)	1.9 (0.07)	219.2 (8.62)
Average precipitation days (≥ 0.1 mm)	3.6	2.2	2.3	2.5	6.2	10.5	11.5	9.3	6.2	1.9	1.3	1.9	59.4
Average snowy days	4.7	3.8	3.3	3.3	1.9	0.2	0	0	0	2.0	2.1	2.6	23.9
Average relative humidity (%)	41	34	28	27	35	44	48	46	45	36	35	38	38
Mean monthly sunshine hours	226.4	219.9	253.1	270.4	272.5	248.8	250.9	252.2	241.3	260.5	237.1	226.5	2,959.6
Percentage possible sunshine	73	71	68	68	62	57	57	61	66	76	79	76	68
Source 1: China Meteorological Administration
Source 2: Weather China

== Transportation ==
The Haixi Delingha Airport and Delingha railway station serve the city. The Delingha Tram is under construction.

== Economy and industry ==
Delingha will be home to a 400 million yuan "Mars village" used by the Chinese Academy of Sciences to plan future Mars explorations missions.

At an altitude of 3,000 meters (9,800 ft), a 50 MW concentrated solar power plant with parabolic trough opened in 2018.
