= Delingha Tram =

Tram system in Delingha, Qinghai, China

- Chinese: 海西州轨道交通

Operation
- Locale: Delingha, Qinghai, China
- Status: Opening suspended

Infrastructure
- Stock: CRRC Qingdao Sifang SFY04

The Delingha Modern Tram is a tram system in Delingha, Qinghai, China.

Construction for phase 1, consisting of the T1 and a branch line and the T2 line started in 2017. The total length is 14.36 km (8.92 mi) and the network included 19 stations and one depot. In total RMB 899 million was budgeted for construction. In May 2020 trial operations started but as of May 2024 revenue operations didn't commence yet. The reason given for the delayed opening were potential safety hazards with operating the tram on the Tibetan Plateau.

The project has been criticized for its cost and usefulness. The city of Delingha has an annual budget of RMB 470 million, half of the cost of the tram construction. The tram was envisioned from the start primarily as a means to promote tourism, despite Delingha not having any A-rated touristic sites nearby. The resident population of the city also only numbers around 70,000. The project has been linked to corruption by the city's former vice mayor Zhang Biao.

The tram was expected to have a maximum speed in 70 kilometres per hour (43 mph) and carry more than 150 passengers.
