= XRN =

XRN or xrn may refer to:

- Xianning North railway station, Hubei, China (telegraph code: XRN)
- Arin language, Russia (ISO 639-3 code: xrn)
