= Trams in Wuhan =

Tram system in Wuhan, Hubei, China

Overview
- Locale: Wuhan, Hubei, China
- Transit type: Tram
- Website: http://www.whggjtjs.com

Operation
- Began operation: July 28, 2017; 9 years ago

Trams in Wuhan may refer to any one of the tram systems currently operational in the city of Wuhan, Hubei, China. The first tram started revenue service in Wuhan is the Auto-city T1 Line, which began on July 28, 2017. Subsequently, Optics Valley tram started revenue service from April 1, 2018.

== Systems ==
=== Auto-city trams ===
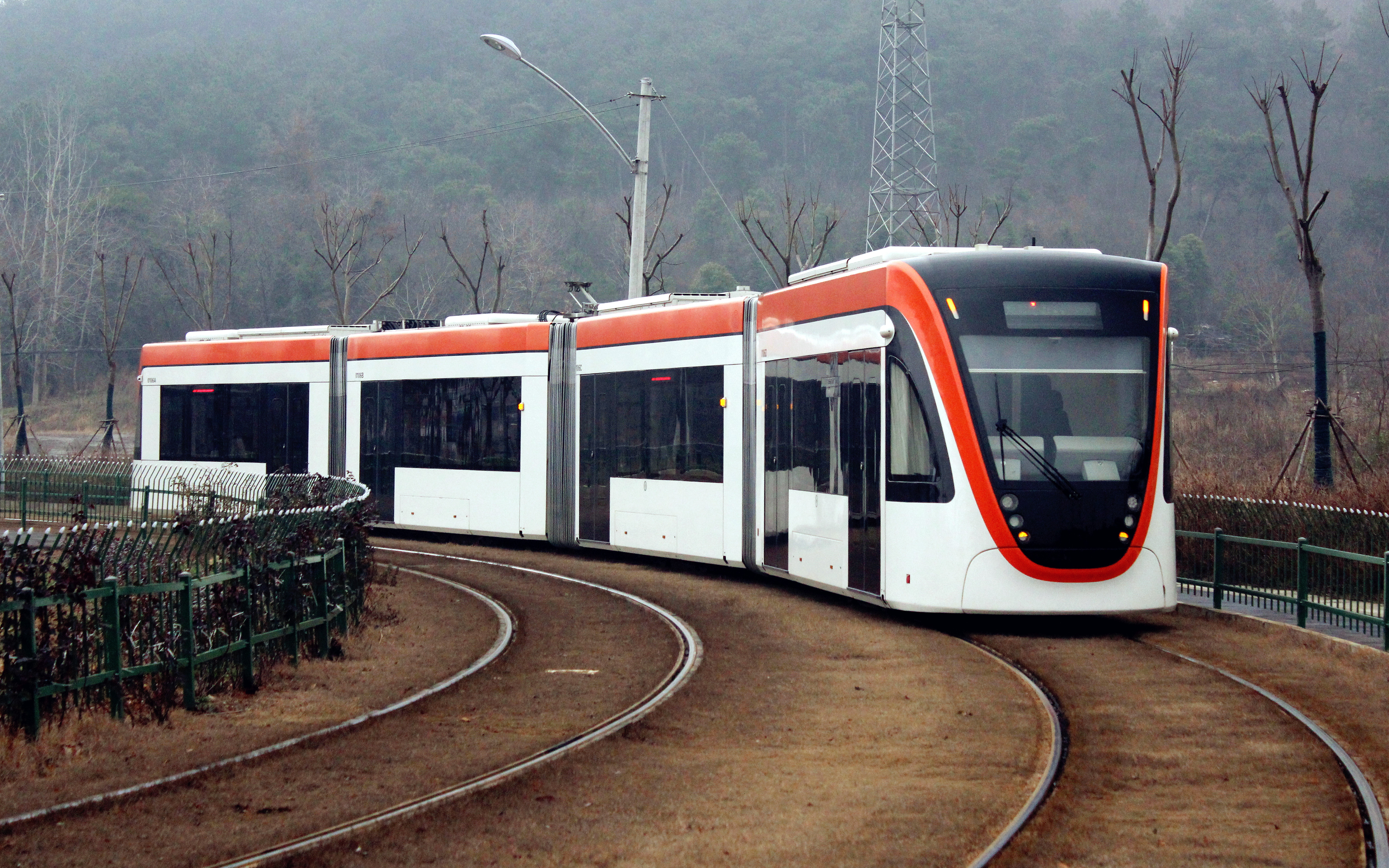
Auto-city T1 Tram

Auto-city T1 line (车都T1线) aka Chedu T1 started revenue service on July 28, 2017, and is the first line of the Auto-city trams. It runs from Chelun Square to Deshenggang in Hanyang District for a length of 16.8 km (10.4 mi) with 22 stations. At Chelun Square it is transferable to Zhuanyang Boulevard Station on Line 3, Wuhan Metro. The planned Auto-city tram system consists of 14 lines, ranging 190.3 km (118.2 mi) and has some 277 stations. The line's 21 tramcars were built by CRRC Zhuzhou Locomotive.

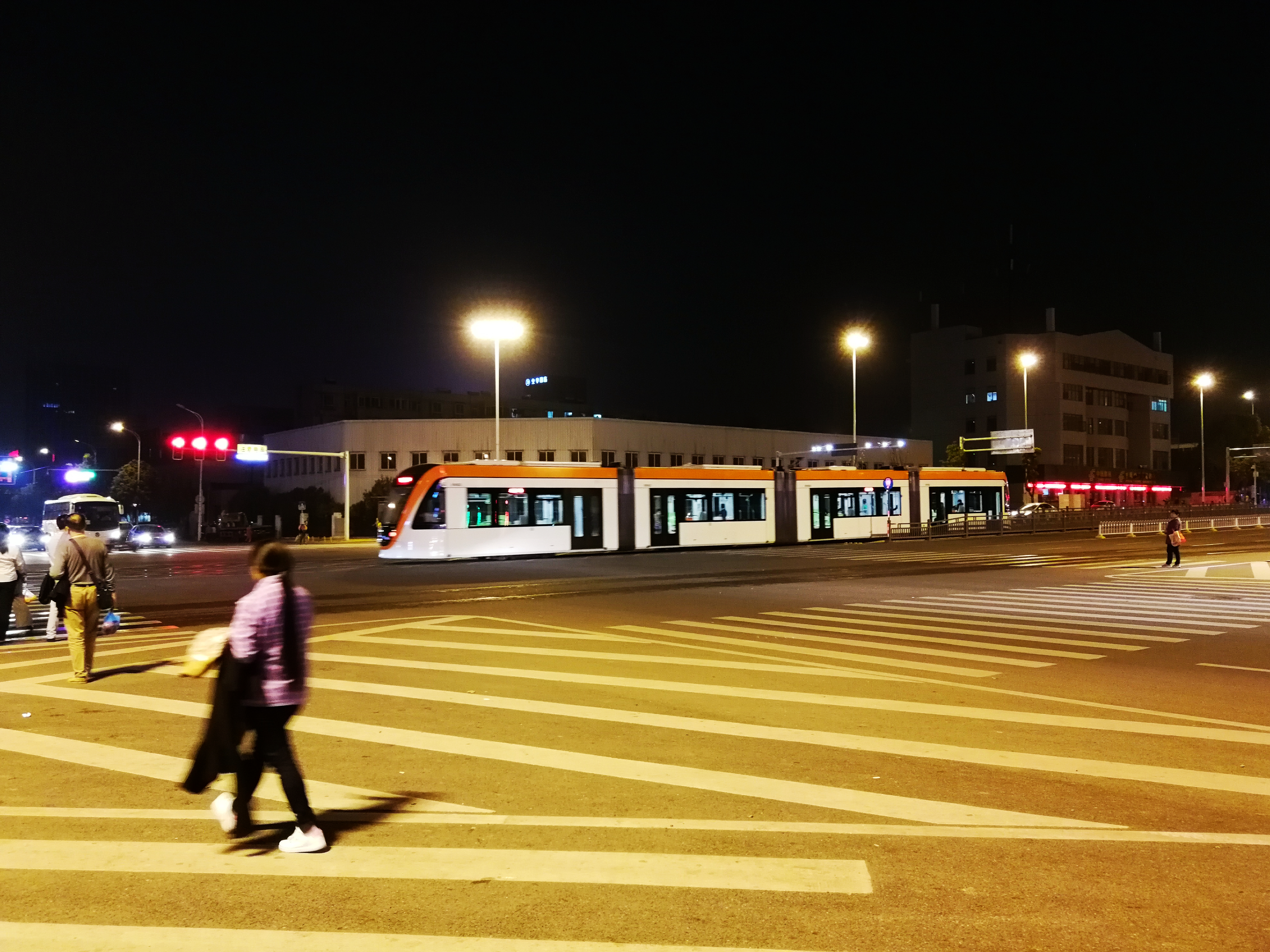
Outside of an Auto-city tram

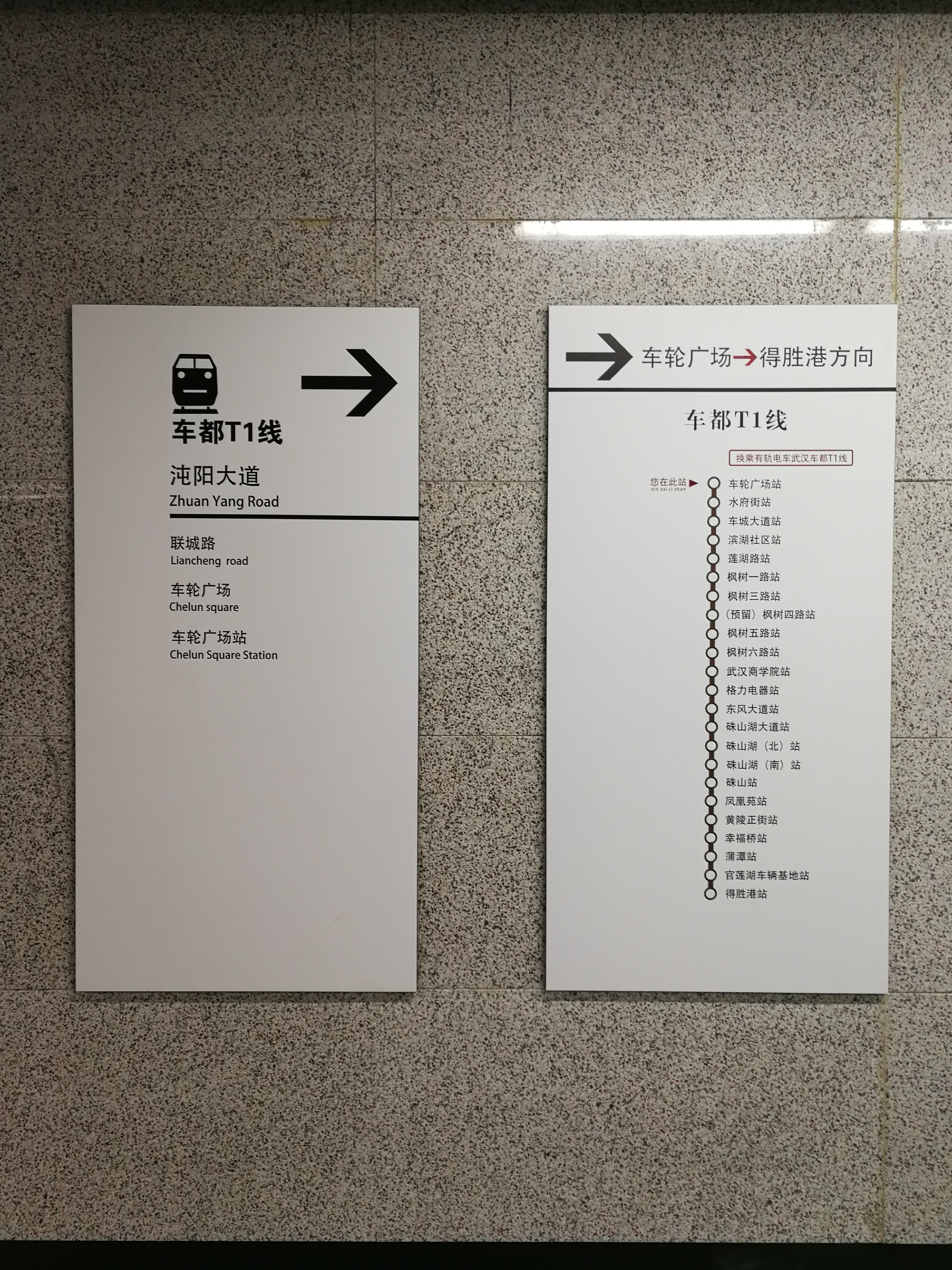
A signboard for Auto-city trams in Interchange Channel

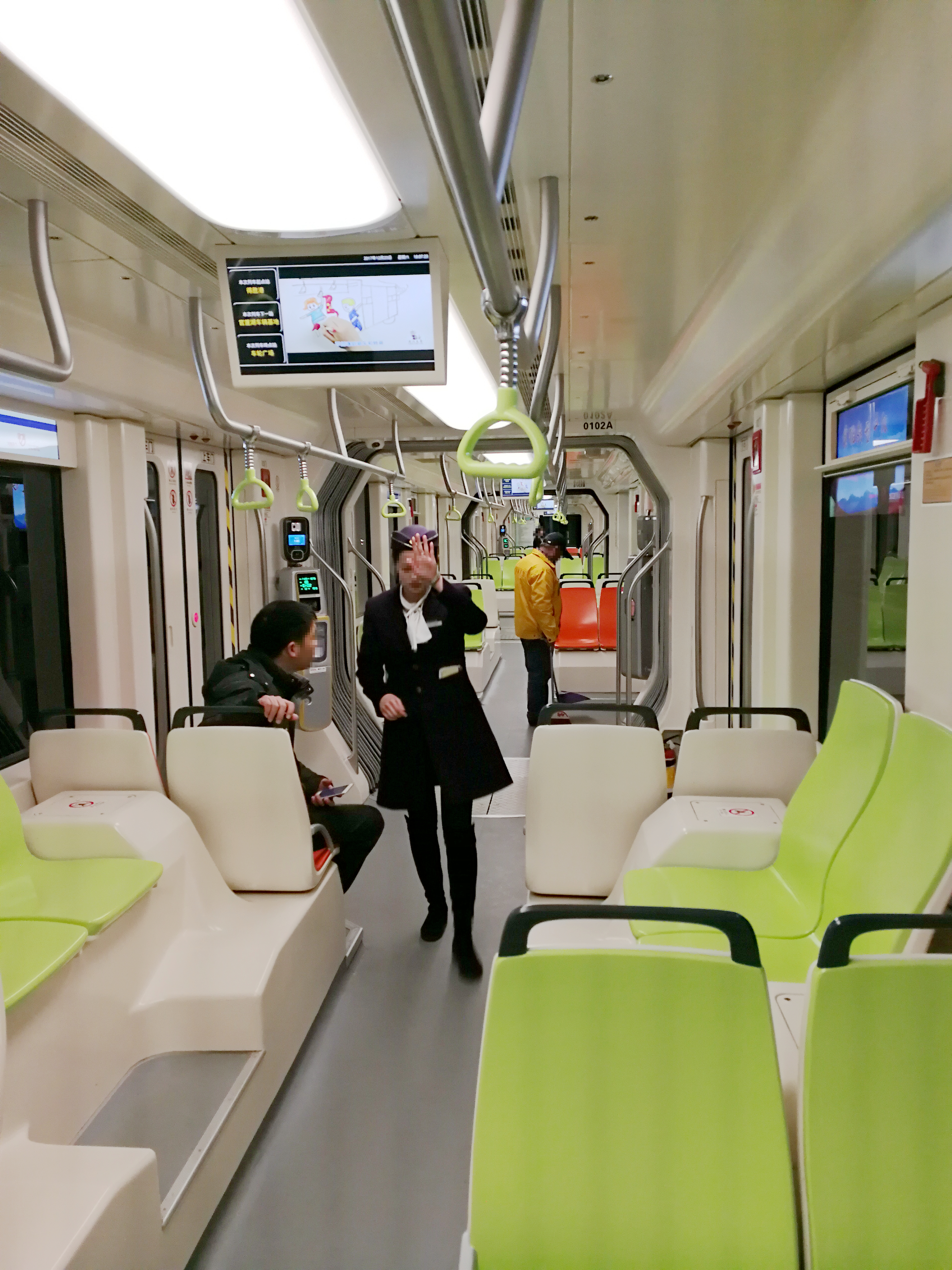
Inside of the car of Auto-city trams

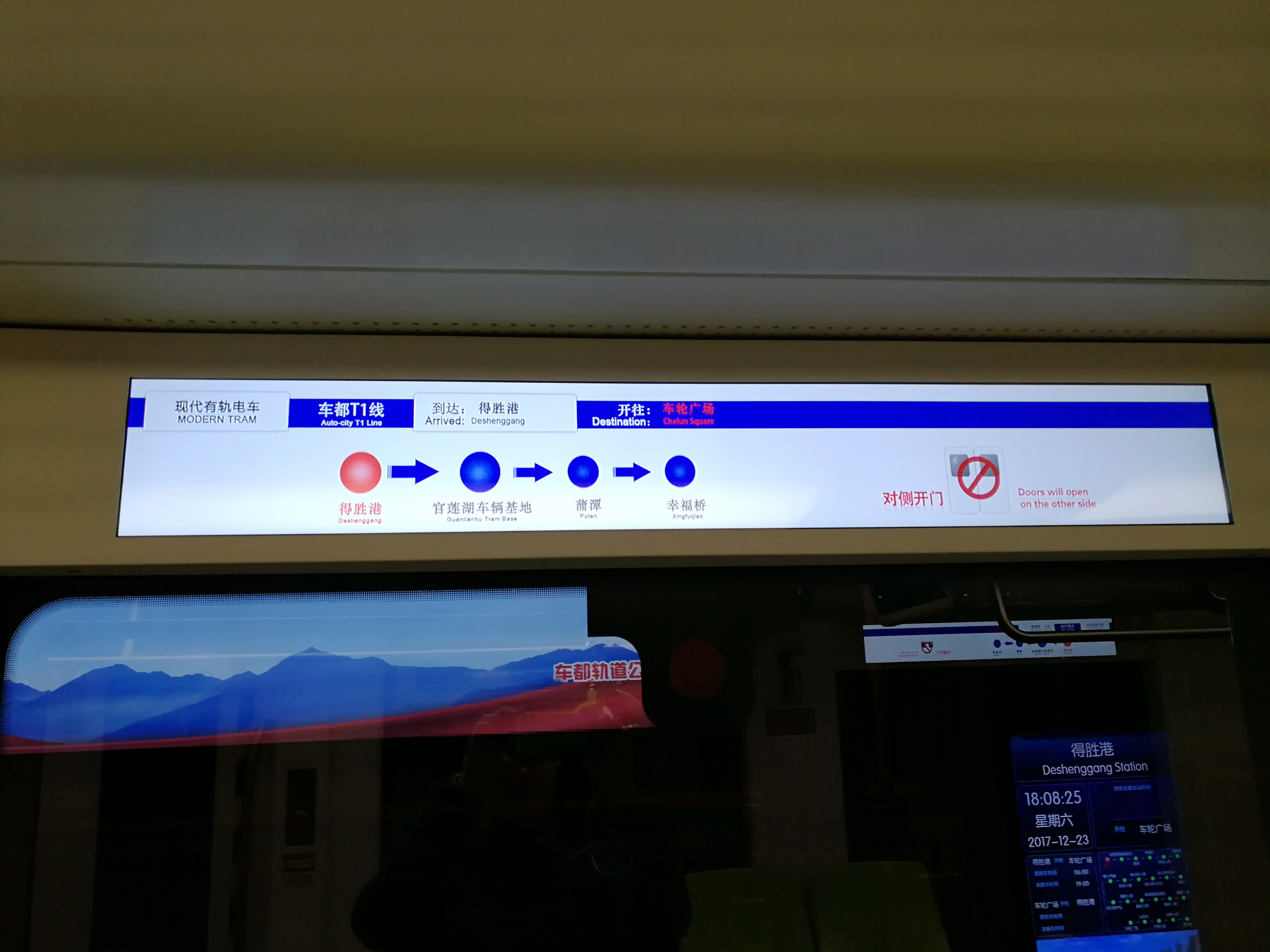
Passenger information system of Auto-city trams in car

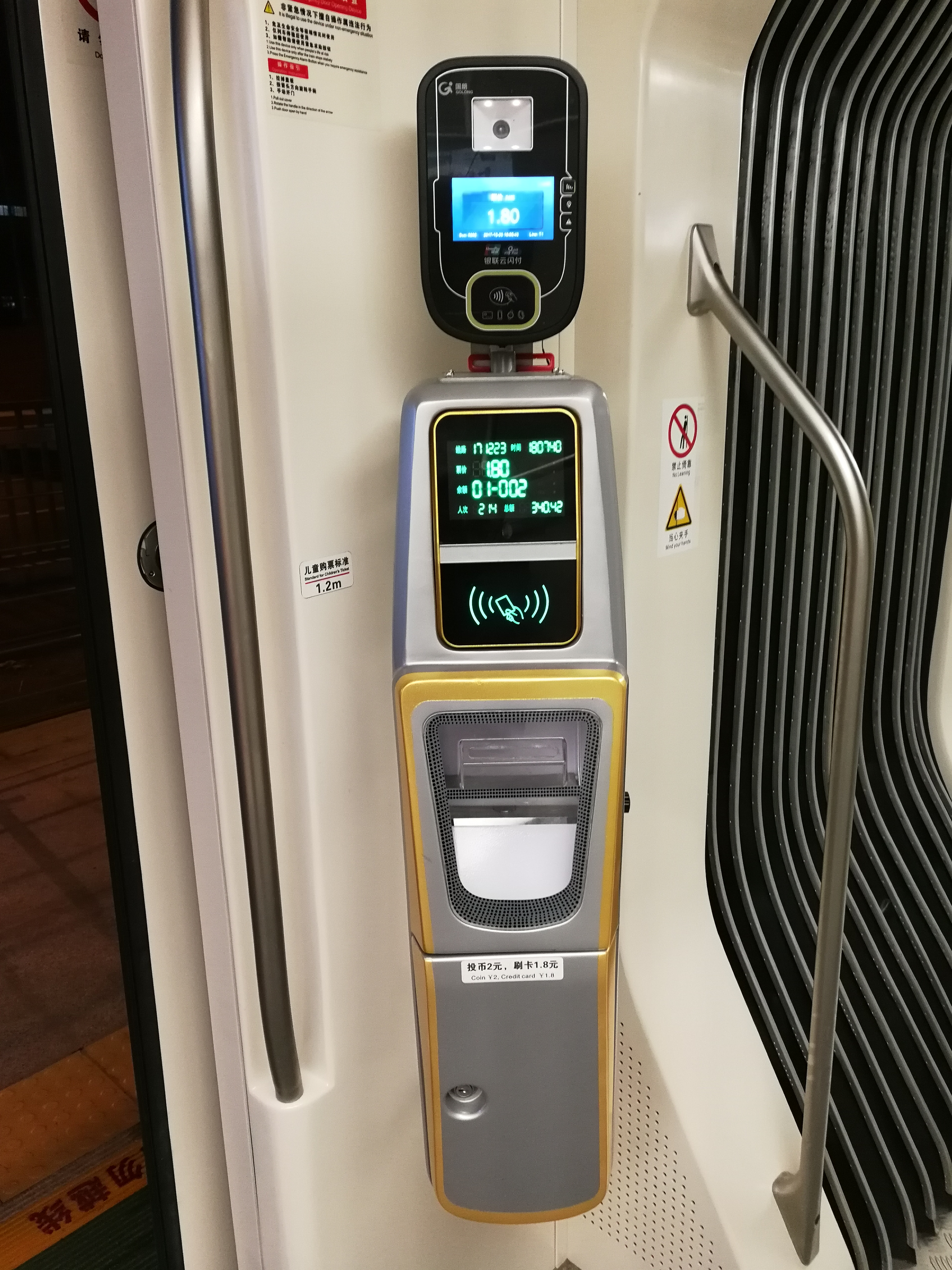
Turnstile in car of Auto-city trams

Tram stops

Stop name		Connections	Location
English	Chinese	Connections	Location
Chelun Square	车轮广场	3 (via Zhuanyang Boulevard)	Caidian
Shuifu Street	水府街		Caidian
Checheng Avenue	车城大道		Caidian
Binhu Community	滨湖社区		Caidian
Lianhu Road	莲湖路		Caidian
Fengshu First Road	枫树一路		Caidian
Fengshu Third Road	枫树三路		Caidian
Fengshu Fourth Road	枫树四路		Caidian
Fengshu Fifth Road	枫树五路		Caidian
Fengshu Sixth Road	枫树六路		Caidian
Wuhan Business University	武汉商学院		Caidian
Gree Electric	格力电器		Caidian
Dongfeng Avenue	东风大道		Caidian
Zhushanhu Avenue	硃山湖大道		Caidian
Zhushanhu North	硃山湖（北）		Caidian
Zhushanhu South	硃山湖（南）		Caidian
Zhushan	硃山		Caidian
Fenghuangyuan	凤凰苑		Caidian
Huangling Main Street	黄陵正街		Caidian
Xingfuqiao	幸福桥		Caidian
Putan	蒲潭		Caidian
Guanlianhu Tram Base	官莲湖车辆基地		Caidian
Deshenggang	得胜港		Caidian

=== Optics Valley trams ===
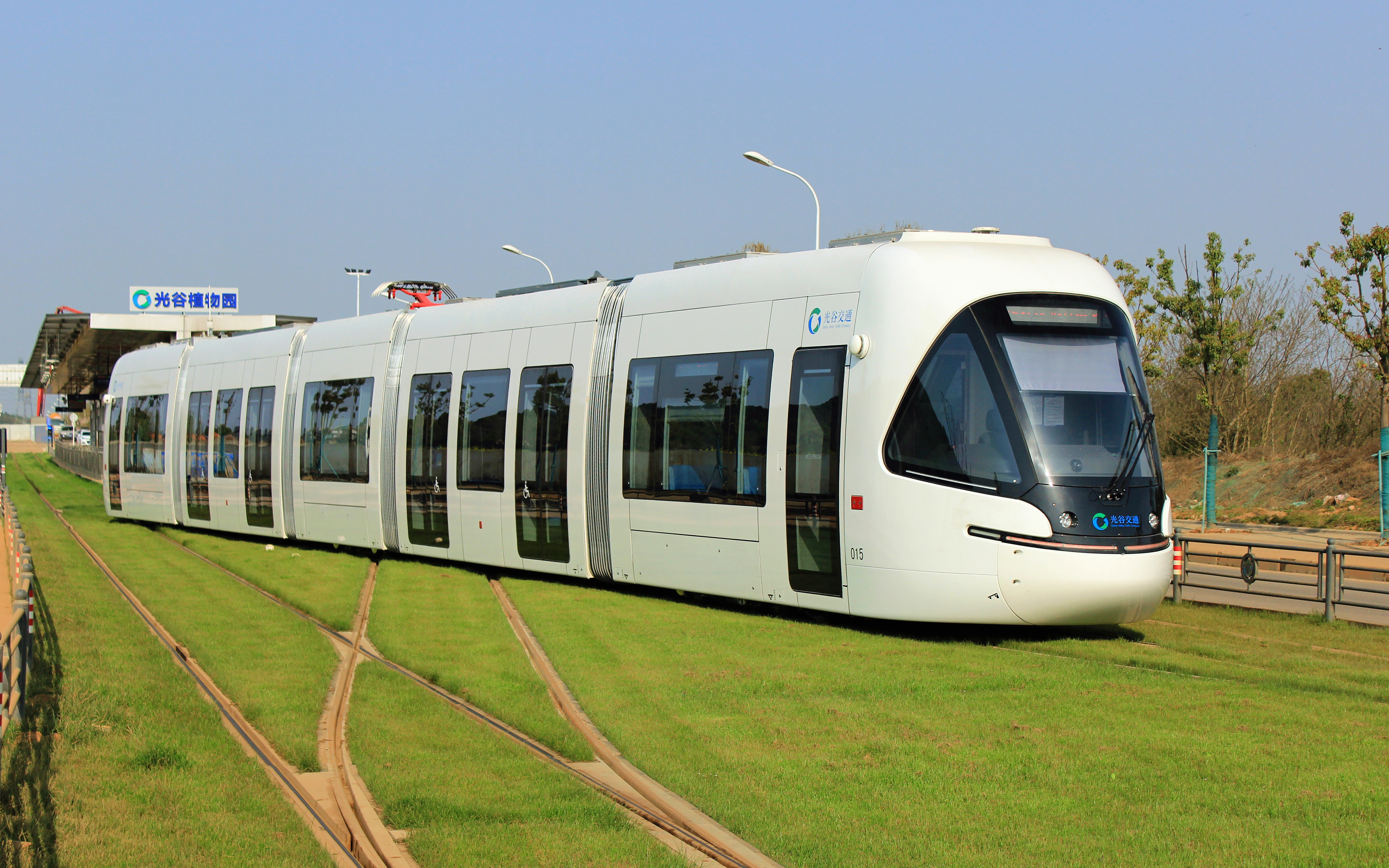
Optics Valley LRV

Two LRT corridors, totaling 36.4 km (22.6 mi), in Wuhan's Optics Valley area started construction since 2013. Although officially there are two lines, a total of six services are operated. After several months of testing, both lines opened for revenue service on April 1, 2018. The LRV cars are designed by Fordyno and built by CRRC Changchun Railway Vehicles.

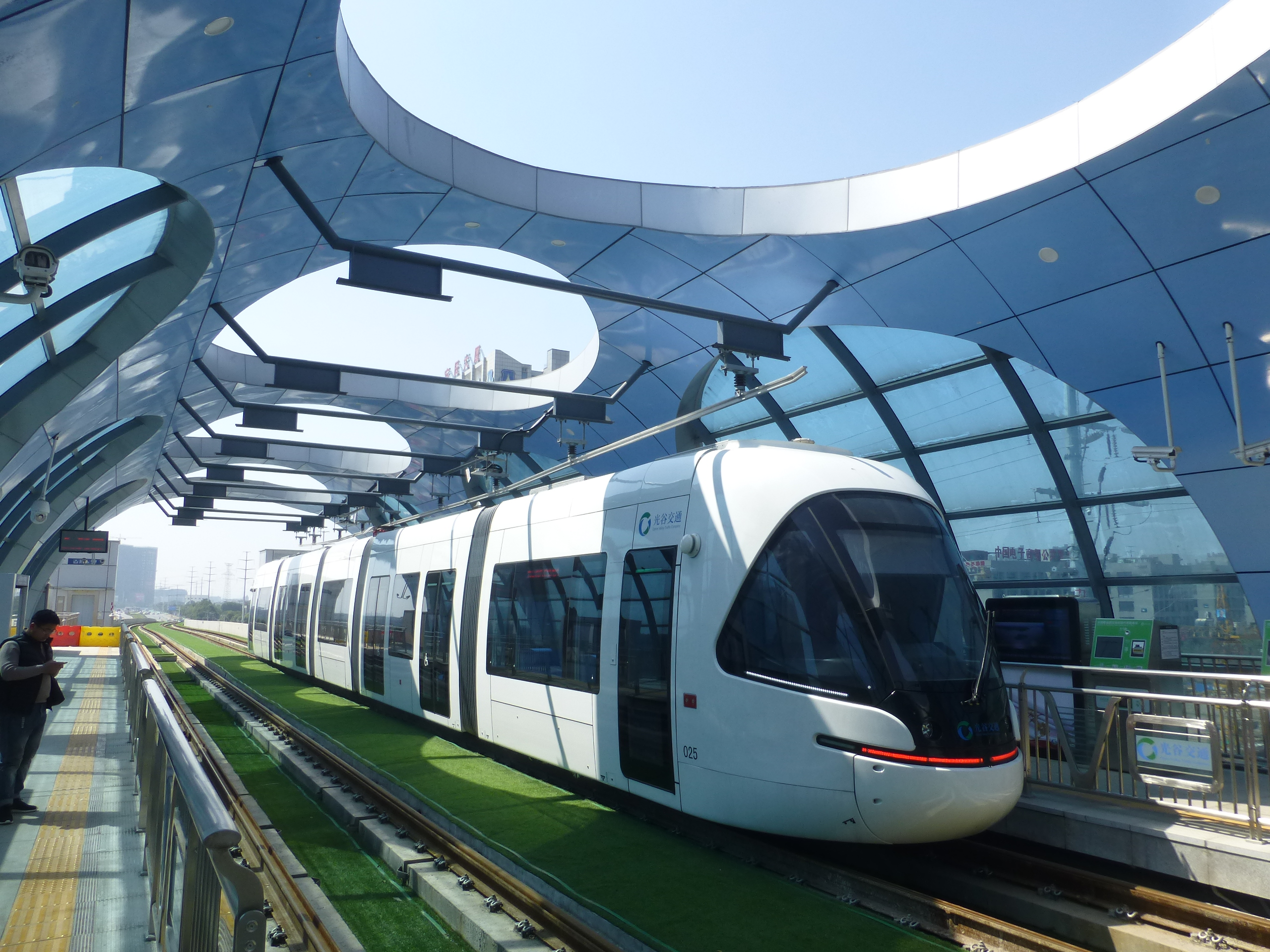
A tram in Wuhan University Science Park (Wudayuan) Station, one of the few elevated stations of the system

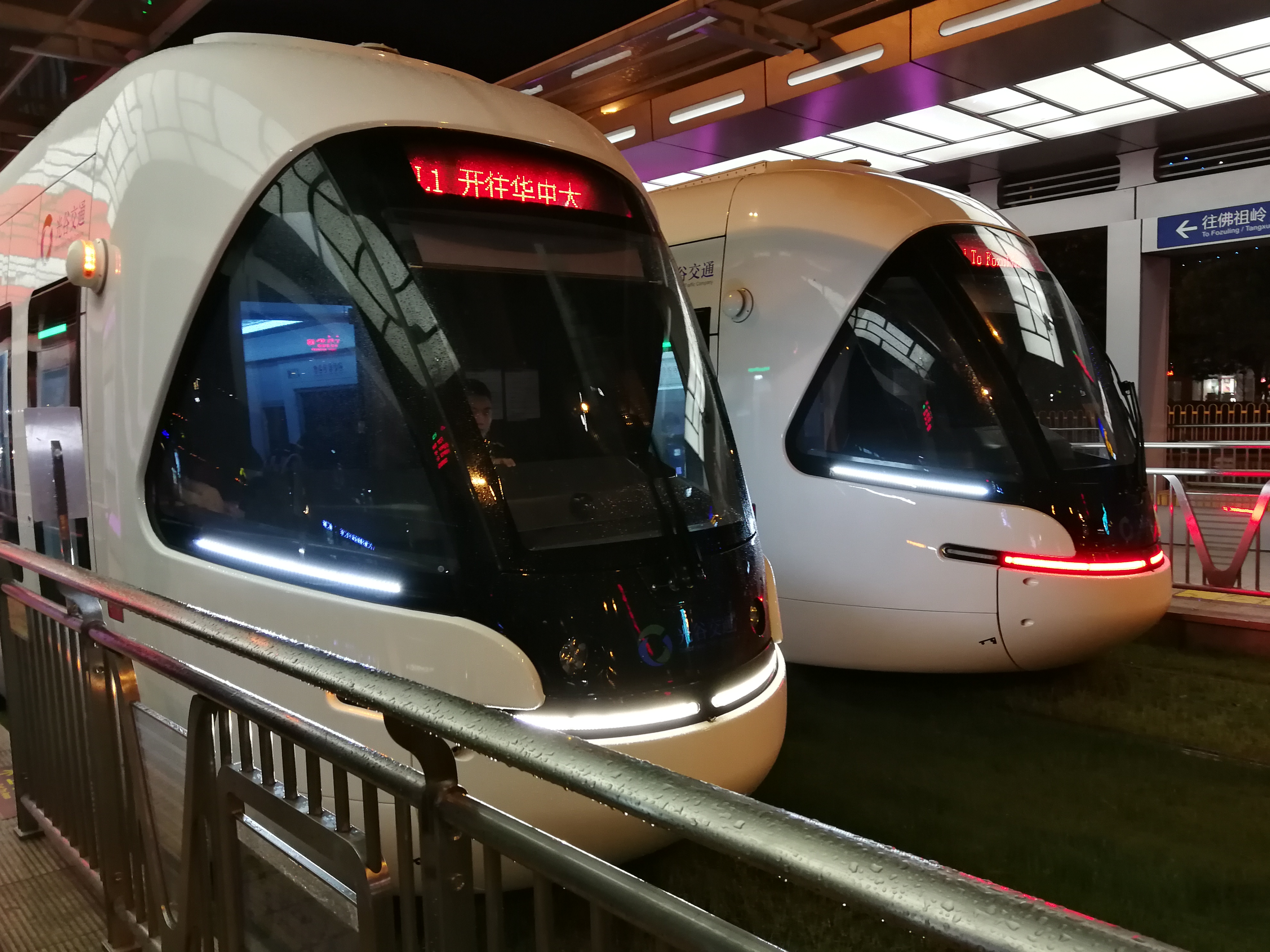
A close-up of the control trailers of Optics Valley trams

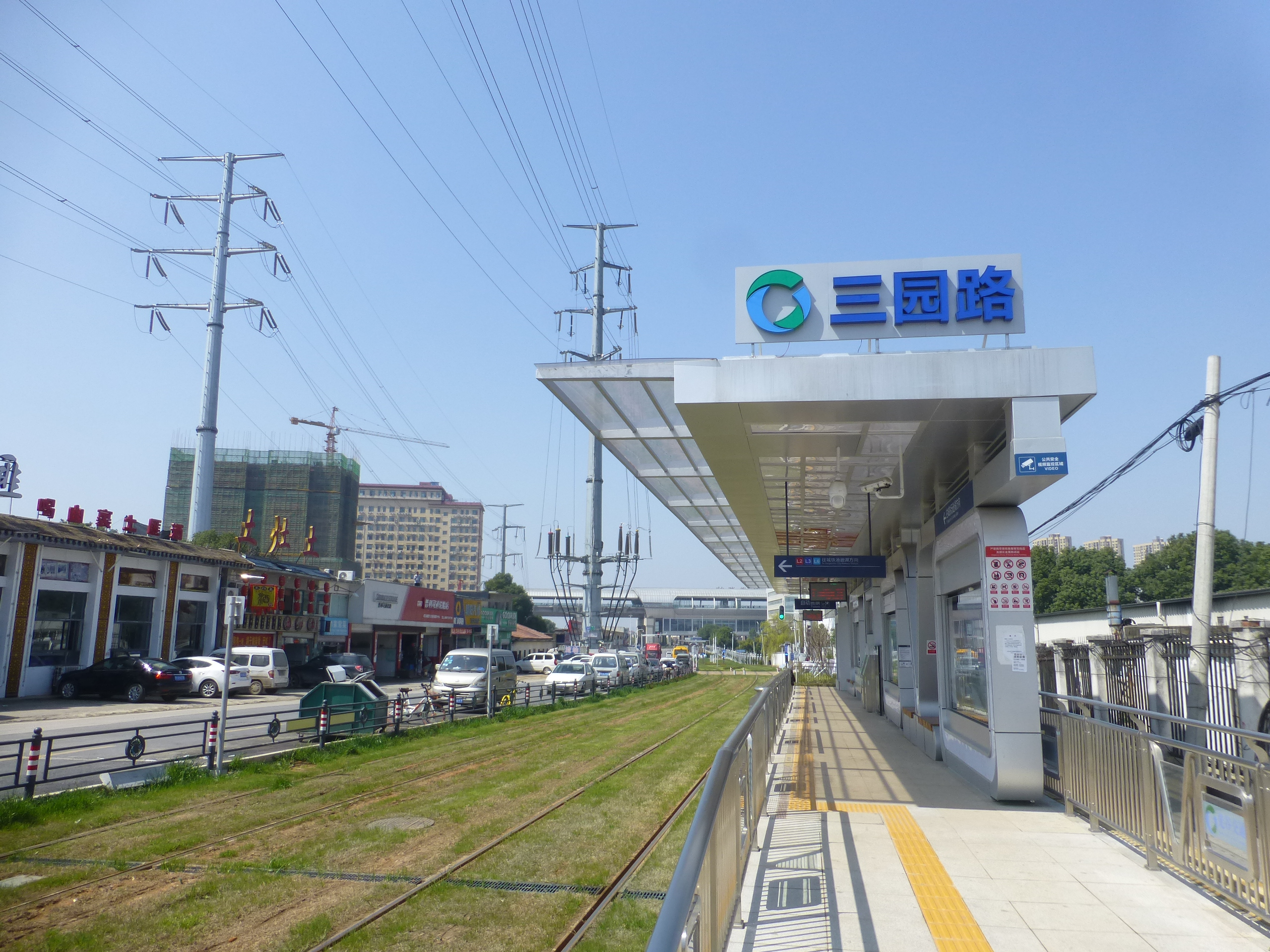
Sanyuan Road (Sanyuanlu), a typical street-level station of the system with green track in the station

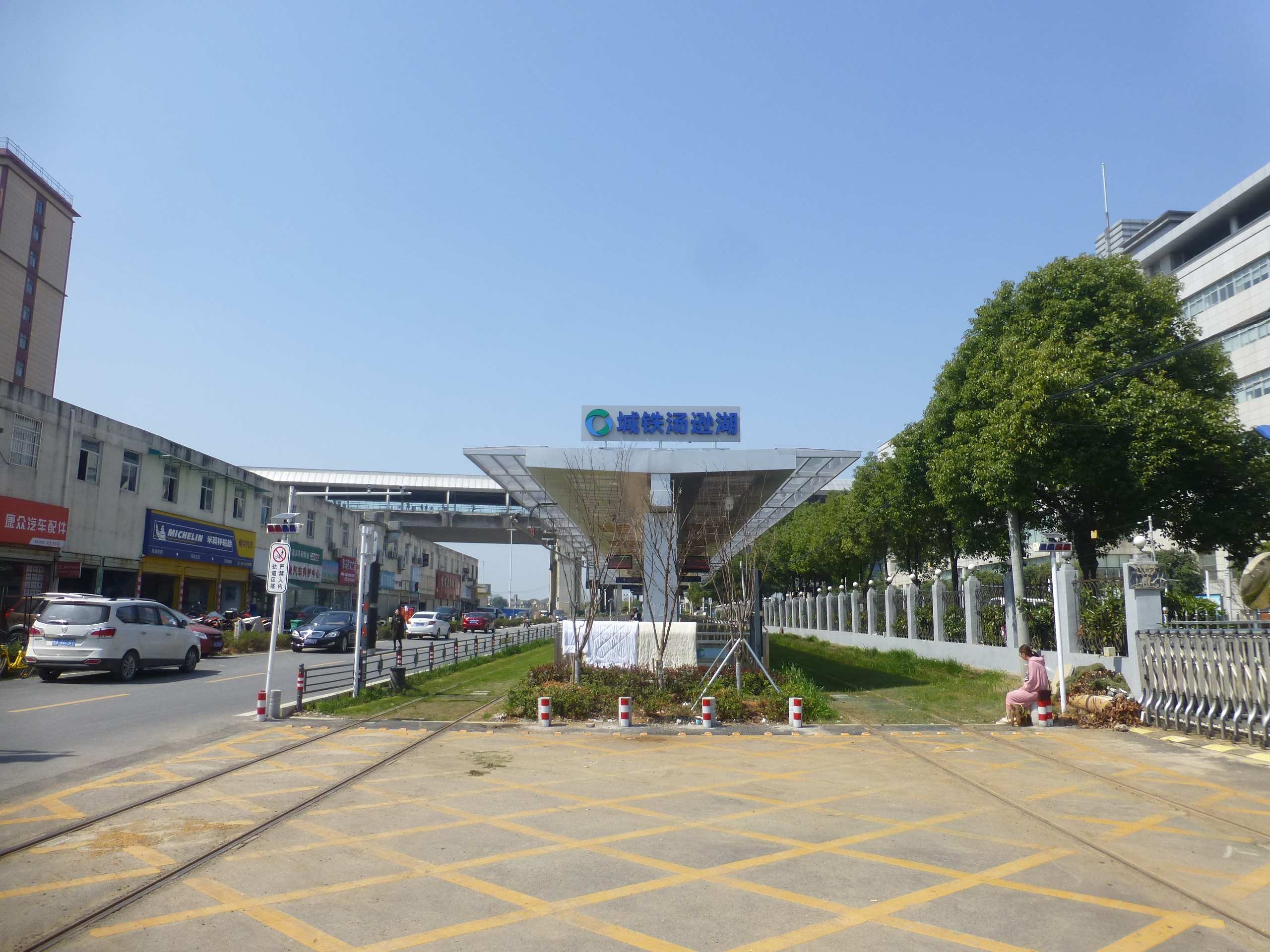
Tangxunhu, the last station of one of the branches. The elevated tracks in the background are the Tangxunhu Station of the Wuhan–Xianning intercity railway

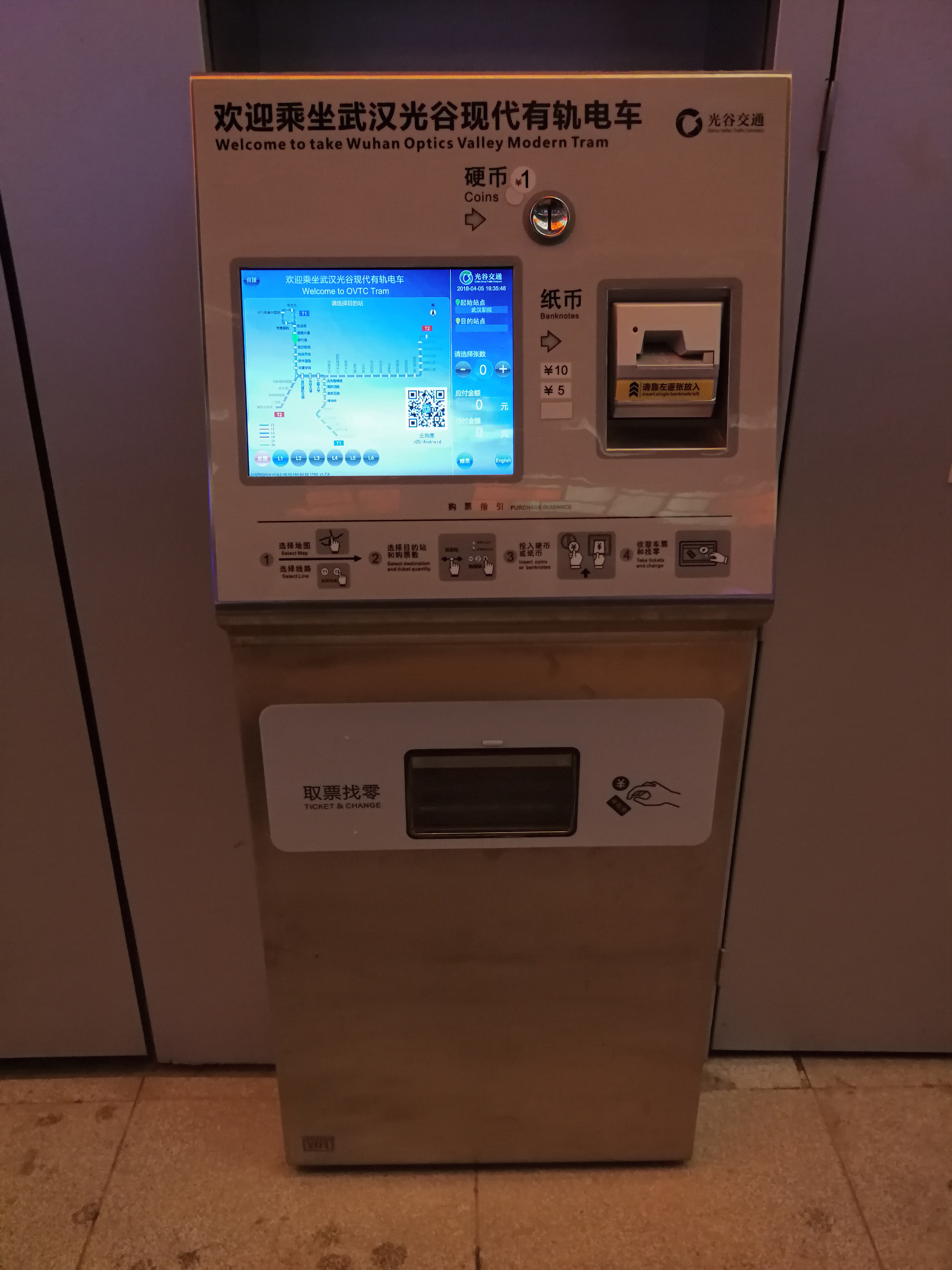
Ticket Vending Machine (TVM) of Optics Valley trams

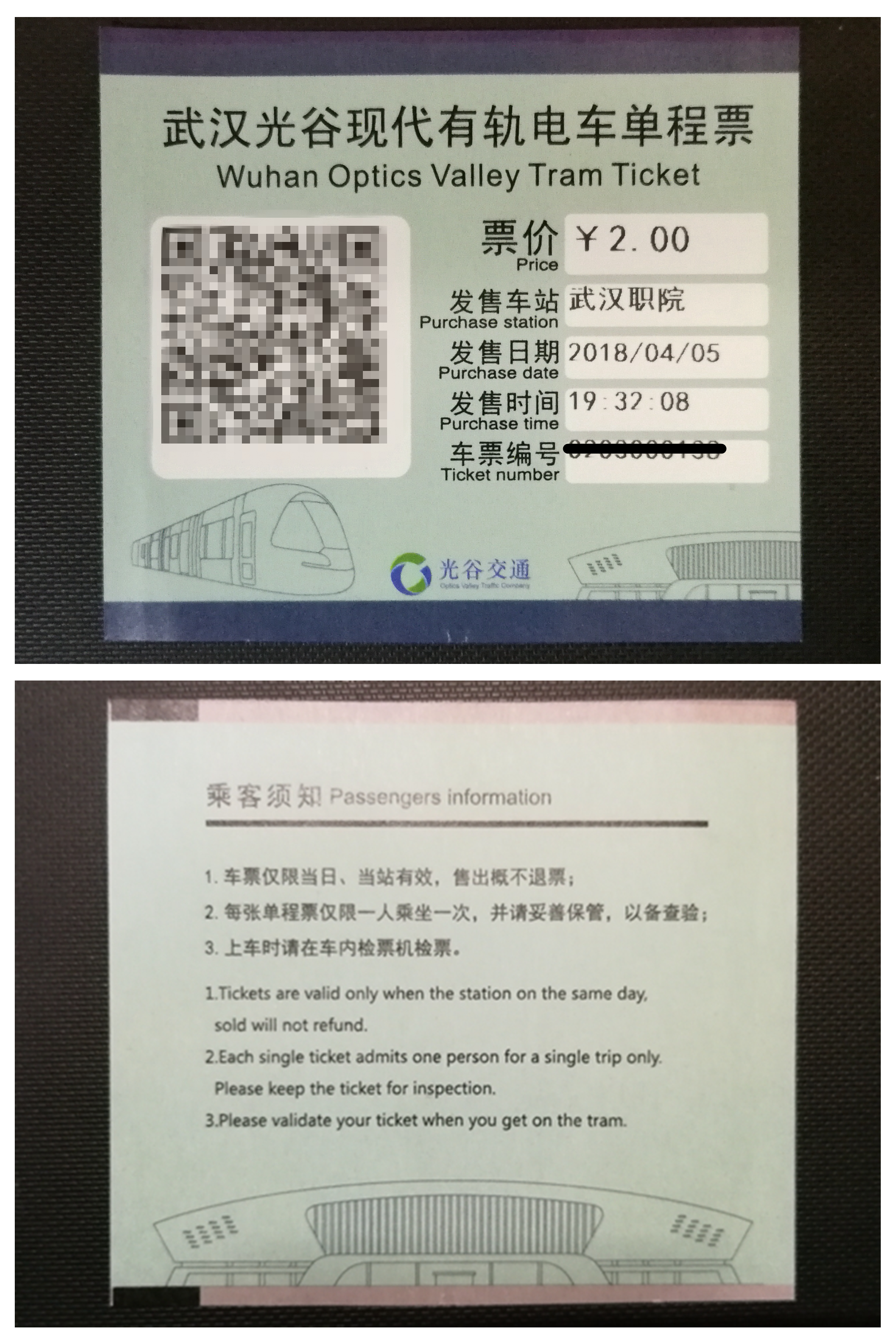
Single Journey ticket of Optics Valley trams

Tram stops

Stop name		Connections	Route service				Location
English	Chinese	Connections	L1	L2	L3		Location
Huazhong University of Science and Technology	华中大	2	●		●		Hongshan
Walking Street & Hospital of Traditional Chinese Medicine	步行街省中医院	2 (via Luoxiong Road)	▼		▼		Hongshan
Changqingteng Road	常青藤路		▼		▼		Hongshan
Chuangye Street	创业街		●		●		Hongshan
Xiongchu Avenue	雄楚大道	Wuhan BRT 11 (via Guanshan Boulevard)	●		●		Hongshan
Xinzhu Road	新竹路		●		●		Hongshan
Wuhan Polytechnic	武汉职院		●		●		Hongshan
Optics Valley World	光谷天地		●		●		Hongshan
Software Park Road	软件园路		●		●		Hongshan
Huaxia University of Technology	华夏学院		●		●	╮	Hongshan
Tangxunhu City Railway Station	城铁汤逊湖	WXN	|	●	●	|	Jiangxia
Sanyuan Road	三园路		|	●	●	|	Jiangxia
HUST Science Park	华中科技园		|	●	●	|	Jiangxia
Wuhan University Science Park	武大园		|	●	●	|	Jiangxia
Vanke City Garden	万科城市花园		|	●	●	╯	Jiangxia
Donde International Garden	当代国际花园		●	●			Jiangxia
Optics Valley Avenue	光谷大道	2 (via Jinronggang North)	●	●			Jiangxia
Wuhan Institute of Technology	工程大学		●	●			Jiangxia
Liufangyuanheng Road	流芳园横路		●	|			Jiangxia
Gaoxin 4th Road	高新四路		●	|			Jiangxia
Gaoxin 5th Road	高新五路		●	|			Jiangxia
Fozuling	佛祖岭	2	●	|			Jiangxia
Instrument and Electronic Technical School	仪表学校			●			Jiangxia
International Tennis Center	国际网球中心			●			Jiangxia
Olympic Sports Center	奥体中心			●			Jiangxia
Aofeng Road	奥风路			●			Hongshan / Jiangxia
Dalü Road	大吕路			●			Hongshan
Optics Valley 4th Road	光谷四路	Optics Valley Monorail (via Gaoxin 2nd Road)		●			Hongshan
Optics Valley 5th Road	光谷五路	19 (via Xinyuexi Park)		●			Hongshan
Huaxi Road	花溪路			●			Hongshan
Shendun 5th Road	神墩五路			●			Hongshan
Gaokeyuan Road	高科园路			●			Jiangxia
Gaokeyuan 2nd Road	高科园二路			●			Jiangxia
Gaoxin 2nd Road	高新二路			●			Jiangxia
Shendun 3rd Road	神墩三路			●			Jiangxia
Optics Valley 7th Road	光谷七路	11		●			Jiangxia
Huawei Wuhan Research Institute	华为武汉基地			●			Jiangxia
Jiufeng 1st Road	九峰一路			●			Hongshan
Optics Valley Botanical Garden	光谷植物园			●			Jiangxia

=== Hankou downtown trams ===
Trams were planned since the Qing dynasty when Hankou served as one of the major economic centers of China. New plans to bring the never built trams back to the streets of Hankou downtown emerged around 2014. No actual construction has taken place as of 2017 in spite of the plans of the trams were made.
