= Xianning =

Xianning 咸宁市 Sienning, Hsien-ning
- Prefecture-level city
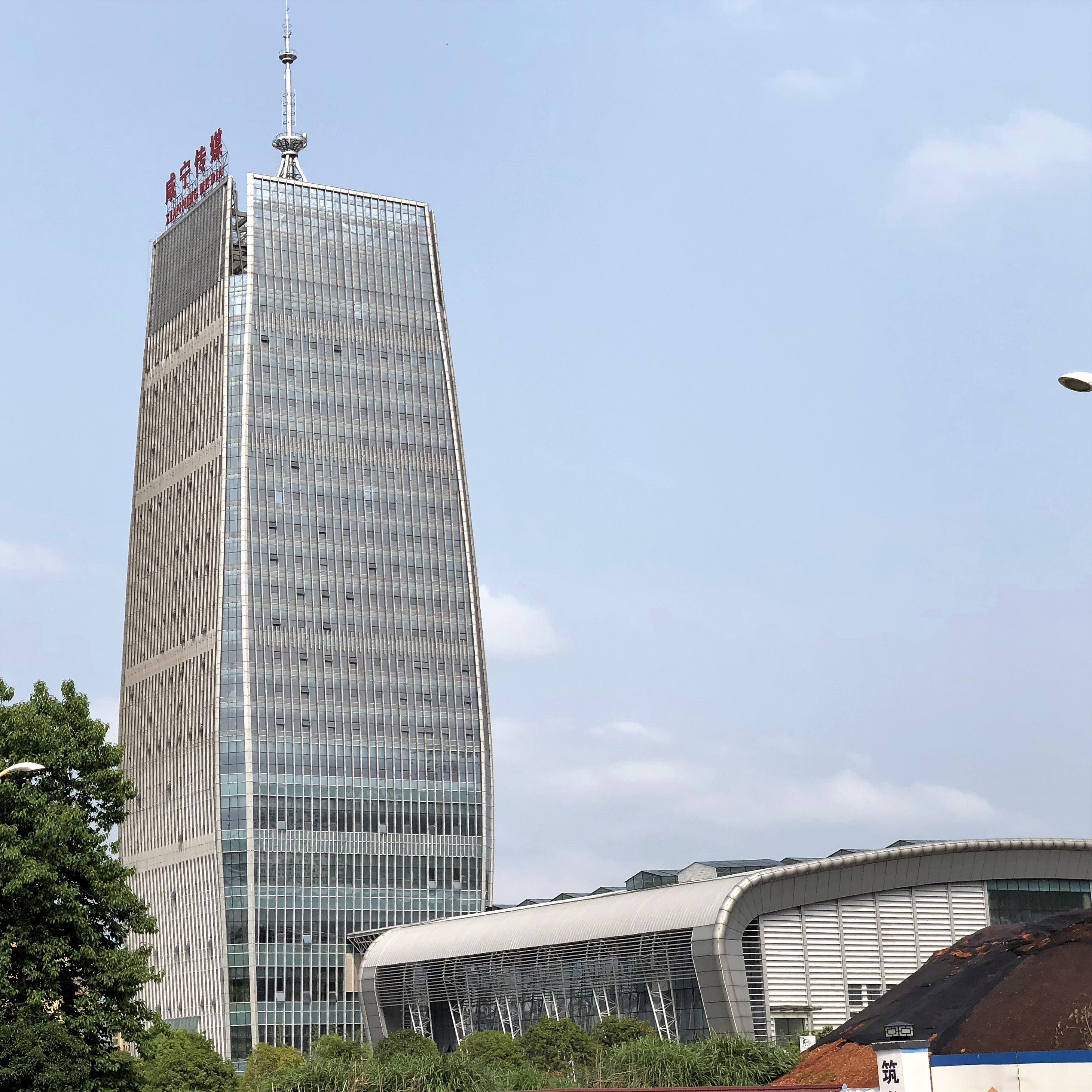
- Xianning Media Tower

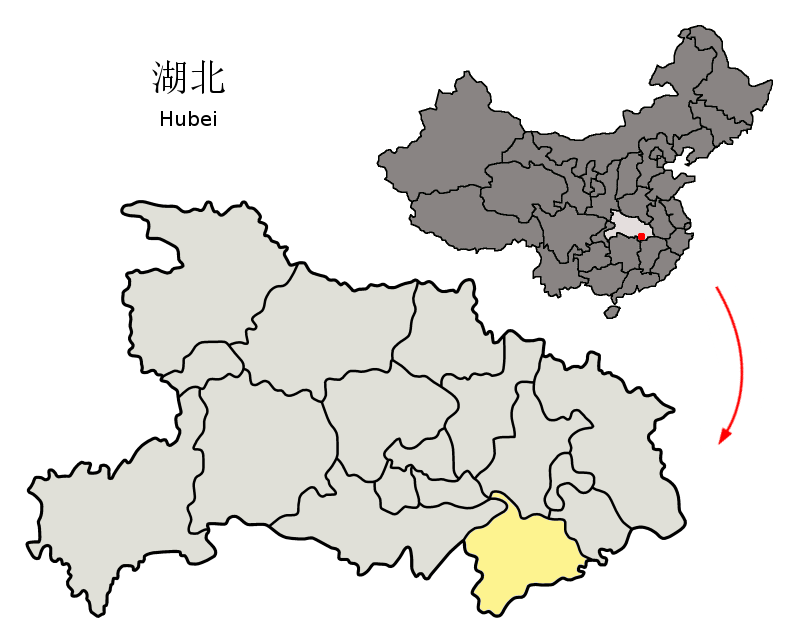
- Location of Xianning City jurisdiction in Hubei

- Location of the city centre in Hubei
- Coordinates (Xianning municipal government): 29°50′29″N 114°19′21″E
- Country: People's Republic of China
- Province: Hubei
- Municipal seat: Xian'an District

Area
  - Prefecture-level city: 9,750 km^{2} (3,760 sq mi)
  - Urban: 1,504 km^{2} (581 sq mi)
  - Metro: 1,504 km^{2} (581 sq mi)

Population (2020 census)
  - Prefecture-level city: 2,658,316
  - Density: 273/km^{2} (706/sq mi)
  - Urban: 657,590
  - Urban density: 437.2/km^{2} (1,132/sq mi)
  - Metro: 657,590
  - Metro density: 437.2/km^{2} (1,132/sq mi)

GDP
  - Prefecture-level city: CN¥ 103.0 billion US$ 16.5 billion
  - Per capita: CN¥ 41,234; US$ 6,620
- Time zone: UTC+8 (China Standard)
- Postal code: 437000
- Area code: 0715
- ISO 3166 code: CN-HB-12
- Licence plate prefixes: 鄂L
- Website: xianning.gov.cn

Xianning (simplified Chinese: 咸宁; traditional Chinese: 咸寧/咸甯; pinyin: Xiánníng) is a prefecture-level city in southeastern Hubei province, People's Republic of China, bordering Jiangxi to the southeast and Hunan to the southwest. It is known as the "City of Osmanthus".

== Geography and climate ==
Xianning is located in southeastern Hubei province, just south of Wuhan, between the southern bank of the Yangtze River in the north and the Mufu Mountains in the south. The land spans 113°32′-114°58′ east longitude and 29°02′-30°19′ north latitude. It borders Jiangxi to the southeast and Hunan to the southwest. It is called Hubei's southern gateway. Xianning is hilly and mountainous (especially in its southern part), with some flatlands (mostly in the north) and lakes. It was home to 2,462,583 inhabitants as of the 2010 census of whom 512,517 lived in the built-up (or metro) area made of Xia'nan District.At the end of 2023 and the beginning of 2024, the permanent population will be 2.6084 million. Its area is 1,504 square kilometres (581 sq mi), 56% of which is forested. Its proximity to Wuhan is transforming the city into an outer suburb of the Hubei's capital.

Xianning has a humid subtropical climate (Köppen Cfa). The climate is mild, with abundant precipitation, sufficient sunshine, four distinct seasons, rain and heat in the same season, and a long frost-free period. The normal monthly mean temperature ranges from 4.6 °C (40.3 °F) in January to 29.2 °C (84.6 °F) in July; the annual mean temperature is 17.22 °C (63.0 °F) and annual precipitation is just below 1,600 millimetres (63.0 in).

Climate data for Xianning, elevation 99 m (325 ft), (1991–2020 normals, extremes 1981–present)
Month	Jan	Feb	Mar	Apr	May	Jun	Jul	Aug	Sep	Oct	Nov	Dec	Year
Record high °C (°F)	24.2 (75.6)	29.0 (84.2)	36.1 (97.0)	35.7 (96.3)	37.4 (99.3)	38.6 (101.5)	41.5 (106.7)	41.7 (107.1)	40.1 (104.2)	39.4 (102.9)	32.2 (90.0)	25.8 (78.4)	41.7 (107.1)
Mean daily maximum °C (°F)	8.5 (47.3)	11.4 (52.5)	17.5 (63.5)	23.2 (73.8)	27.4 (81.3)	30.1 (86.2)	33.4 (92.1)	33.2 (91.8)	28.9 (84.0)	23.4 (74.1)	17.3 (63.1)	11.2 (52.2)	22.1 (71.8)
Daily mean °C (°F)	4.4 (39.9)	6.9 (44.4)	12.2 (54.0)	17.6 (63.7)	22.1 (71.8)	25.4 (77.7)	28.5 (83.3)	28.1 (82.6)	23.9 (75.0)	18.3 (64.9)	12.3 (54.1)	6.4 (43.5)	17.2 (62.9)
Mean daily minimum °C (°F)	1.5 (34.7)	3.6 (38.5)	8.1 (46.6)	13.2 (55.8)	18.0 (64.4)	21.8 (71.2)	24.9 (76.8)	24.3 (75.7)	20.3 (68.5)	14.6 (58.3)	8.7 (47.7)	2.8 (37.0)	13.5 (56.3)
Record low °C (°F)	−6.7 (19.9)	−7.7 (18.1)	−2.2 (28.0)	2.3 (36.1)	9.0 (48.2)	12.6 (54.7)	19.4 (66.9)	18.4 (65.1)	10.8 (51.4)	2.3 (36.1)	−2.5 (27.5)	−10.7 (12.7)	−10.7 (12.7)
Average precipitation mm (inches)	74.8 (2.94)	90.8 (3.57)	137.9 (5.43)	187.6 (7.39)	202.0 (7.95)	244.4 (9.62)	251.0 (9.88)	153.8 (6.06)	91.7 (3.61)	77.7 (3.06)	79.4 (3.13)	49.7 (1.96)	1,640.8 (64.6)
Average precipitation days (≥ 0.1 mm)	12.1	12.4	15.4	13.9	14.2	14.0	13.3	12.5	9.4	9.9	10.4	9.3	146.8
Average snowy days	4.7	2.2	0.6	0	0	0	0	0	0	0	0.2	1.7	9.4
Average relative humidity (%)	78	77	76	75	76	80	77	79	78	76	77	75	77
Mean monthly sunshine hours	85.7	86.1	104.7	132.1	144.2	135.5	189.8	182.8	146.3	136.4	119.9	115.1	1,578.6
Percentage possible sunshine	26	27	28	34	34	32	45	45	40	39	38	37	35
Source: China Meteorological Administration

== History ==
The word "Xianning" comes from the "Book of Changes" "The first common people come out, all nations are in Xianning", which means happiness and peace in all parts of the world. Xianning was under the jurisdiction of Nanjun County during the Qin dynasty. At the end of the Han dynasty, Xianning became a strategic point where conflict occurred; Xianning is a likely site for the Battle of Red Cliffs. During the Ming and Qing dynasties, the jurisdiction belonged to Wuchang Prefecture. In the 21st year of the Republic of China (1932), Tongshan belonged to the Second Administrative Supervision District of Hubei Province, and other counties belonged to the First Administrative Supervision District. During the Cultural Revolution, it was an important area for the Hunan, Hubei and Jiangxi Revolutionary Bases.

== Administration ==
Xianning has 1 district, 4 counties, 1 county-level city and 1 other area.

District:

- Xian'an District (咸安区) (location of Xianning's main urban area, i.e. the place that low-resolution maps would label as "Xianning")

Counties:

- Tongshan County (通山县)
- Chongyang County (崇阳县)
- Tongcheng County (通城县)
- Jiayu County (嘉鱼县)

City:

- Chibi City (赤壁市)

Other Area:

- Xianning Advanced Technology Industry Area (咸宁高新技术产业园区)

Map
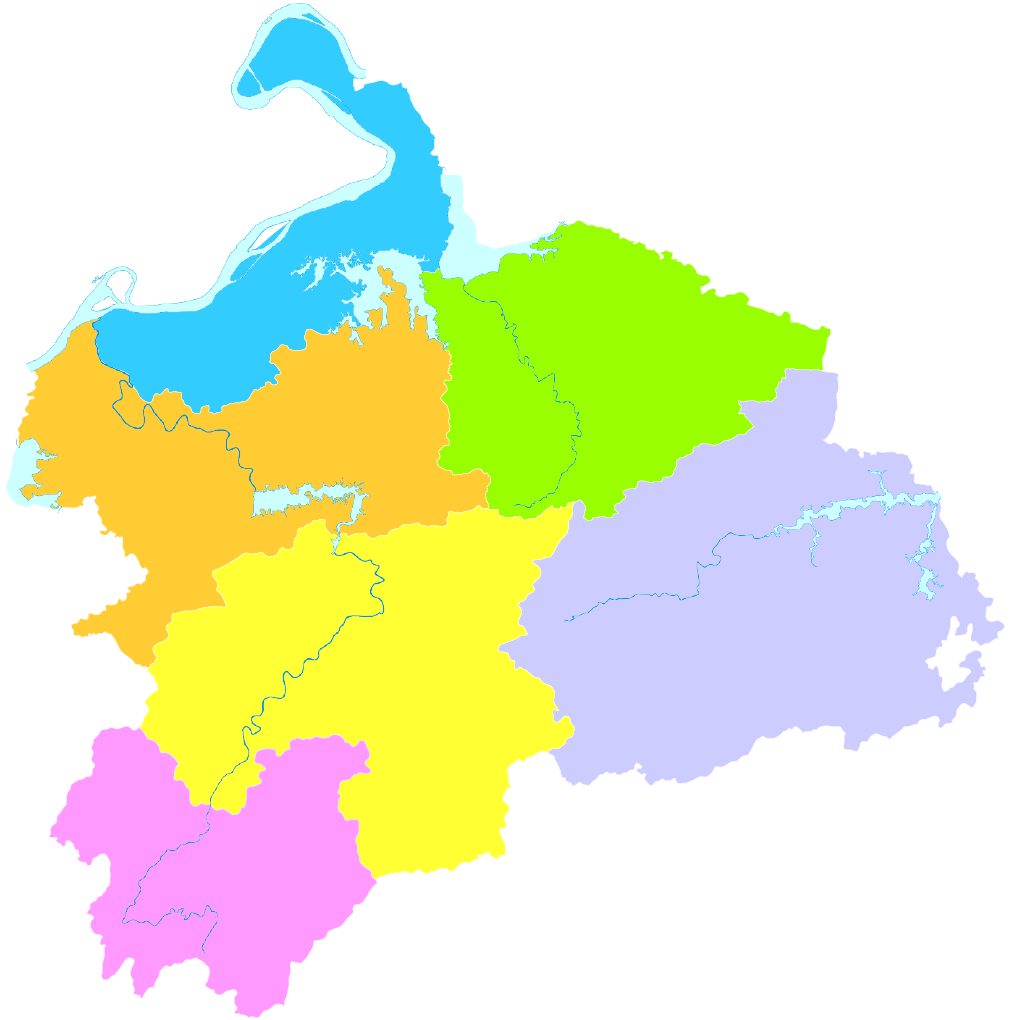

== Demographics ==
As of the 2020 Chinese census, Xianning has a total population of 2,658,316 people, of whom 657,590 lived in the built-up (or metro) area made of Xian'an District. Most of the inhabitants of Xianning are Han; only 4,785 are from other ethnic groups including Hui, Tujia, Zhuang, Miao, Manchu, and Dong. The place with the largest ethnic minority population is in Chibi City.

== Economy ==
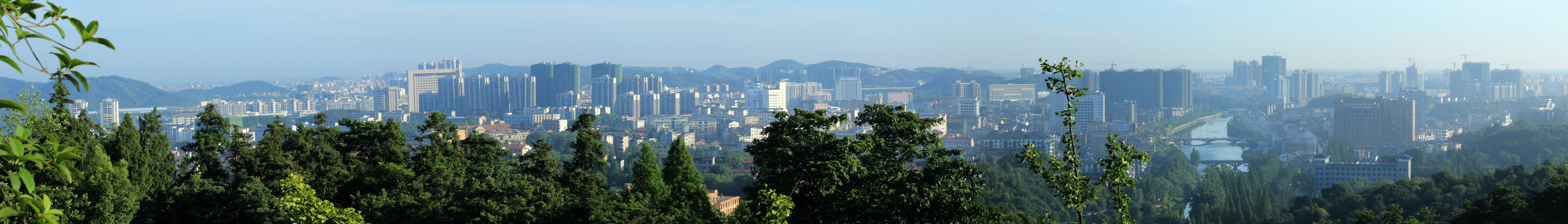
Panoramic view of Xianning

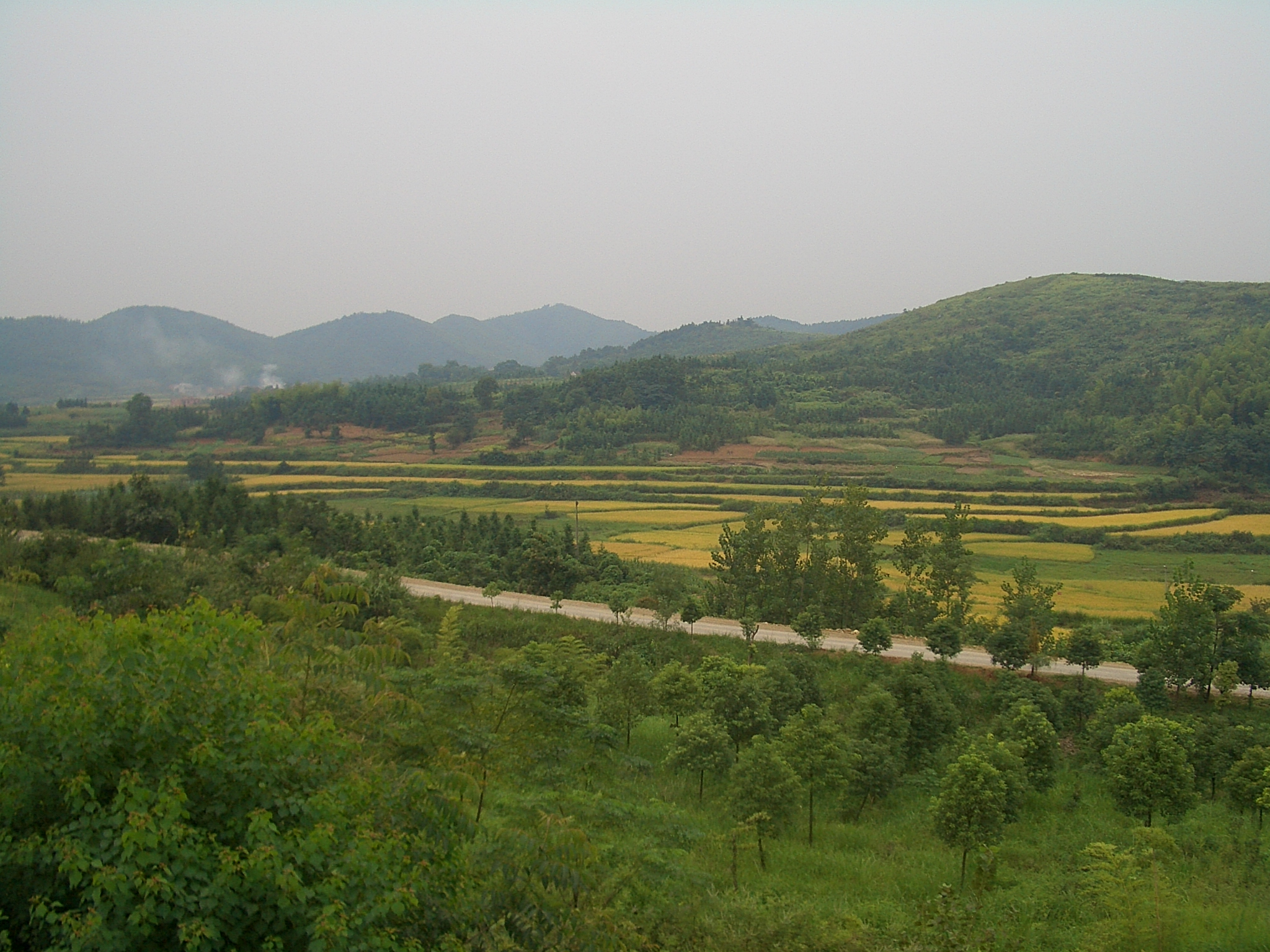
Rice fields south of Xianning urban area

Agriculture and forestry are two of Xianning's biggest industries. It is known by the three names, "City of Osmanthus", "City of Nan Bamboo", and "City of Tea". There are more than 1 million mu (~151,822 English acres) of "Nan" Bamboo, 30,000 Chinese acres of osmanthus, and more than 150,000 Chinese acres of tea.

Mineral resources are also an important part of Xianning's economy. Niobium, gold, magnesium, antimony, monazite, coal, manganese, vanadium, mica, and marble are all mined or quarried in Xianning.

Xianning Nuclear Power Plant is under construction near Dafan Town, Tongshan County. On 17 August 2010, the Shaw Group announced an agreement with State Nuclear Power Engineering Corp. Ltd., a subsidiary of China's State Nuclear Power Technology Corp. Ltd. (SNPTC), to add two new AP1000 units at the Xianning Nuclear Power Plant.

=== Transportation ===
Xianning has major rail lines, including the Beijing-Guangzhou line, many national highways, and a large stretch of the Yangtze River, making it an important transportation and shipping center.

As of 2015, four different train stations located in or near Xianning's main urban area have "Xianning" in their name; several other stations are located elsewhere within the prefecture-level city.

There are two passenger train stations on the "conventional" Beijing-Guangzhou line within the Prefecture-level city of Xianning - the Xianning Railway Station in urban area itself (80 kilometres (50 mi) from Wuhan's Wuchang train station), and the one in Chibi (118 kilometres (73 mi) from Wuchang) - are usually the first and the second stops for the slower trains leaving Wuchang toward Changsha and Guangzhou. Typical travel times from Wuchang is 40-50 min and 1 hour 20 min, respectively.

The new Wuhan–Guangzhou High-Speed Railway has Xianning North Railway Station, which is located on the northern outskirts of the city's main urban area, about 2 km (1.2 mi) northeast of Xianning Railway Station.

The Wuhan–Xianning Intercity Railway (part of the future Wuhan Metropolitan Area Intercity Railway system), opened in December 2013, provides direct rail service from Wuhan's Wuchang Railway Station to Xianning city center. It has two stations in the city's main urban area: Xianning East Railway Station in the downtown Xianning, and Xianning South, the end-of-line (dead-end) station in the industrial area south of downtown. When the system was under construction, the expected travel time from Wuchang to Xianning was stated to be 28 min, but as of 2015, the typical scheduled time from Wuchang to Xianning South (91 km or 57 mi) is more like 70 to 100 min.

== Tourism ==
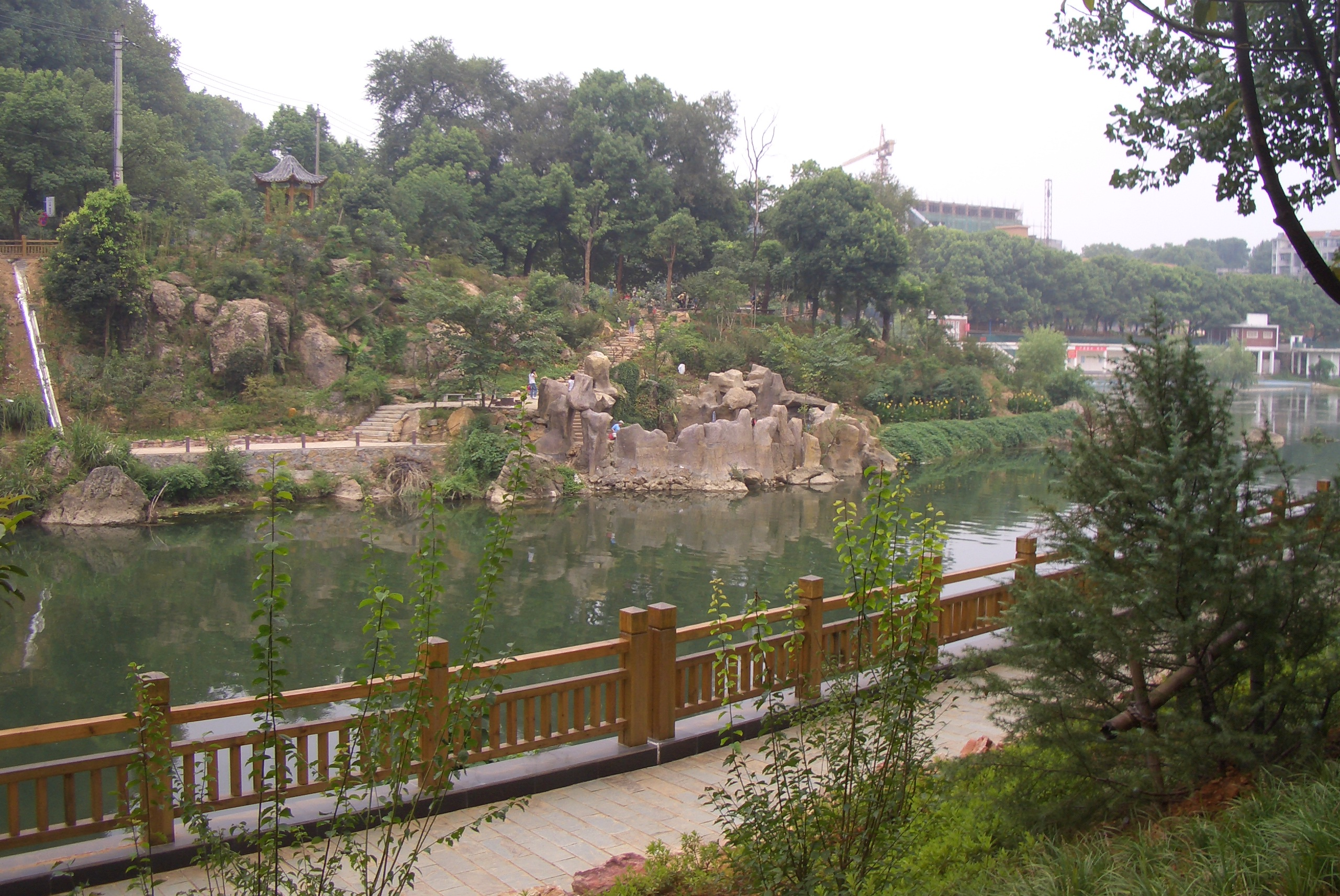
A park in Xianning

Xianning's biggest tourist draw is its natural scenery. There are many sites including Taiyi Cave (太乙洞), Star Bamboo Sea (星星竹海), Mount Jiugong (九宫山, in Tongshan County), Lushui Lake (陆水湖), as well as the historical site the Chibi Ancient Ruins (赤壁遗址).

At the "Underground Project 131" site, some 15 kilometres (9.3 mi) southeast of downtown Xianning (within Xian'an District, tourists can visit a system of tunnels that were built in 1969–71 to accommodate national military headquarters in the case of a war, but never used. The Xianning Sports Centre Stadium is located in the city. It has a capacity of 12,000 and it attracts many football fans from the region.

== Sister city ==
- Victoria, Labuan, Malaysia.
