= Xian'an, Xianning =

Xian'an 咸安区
- District
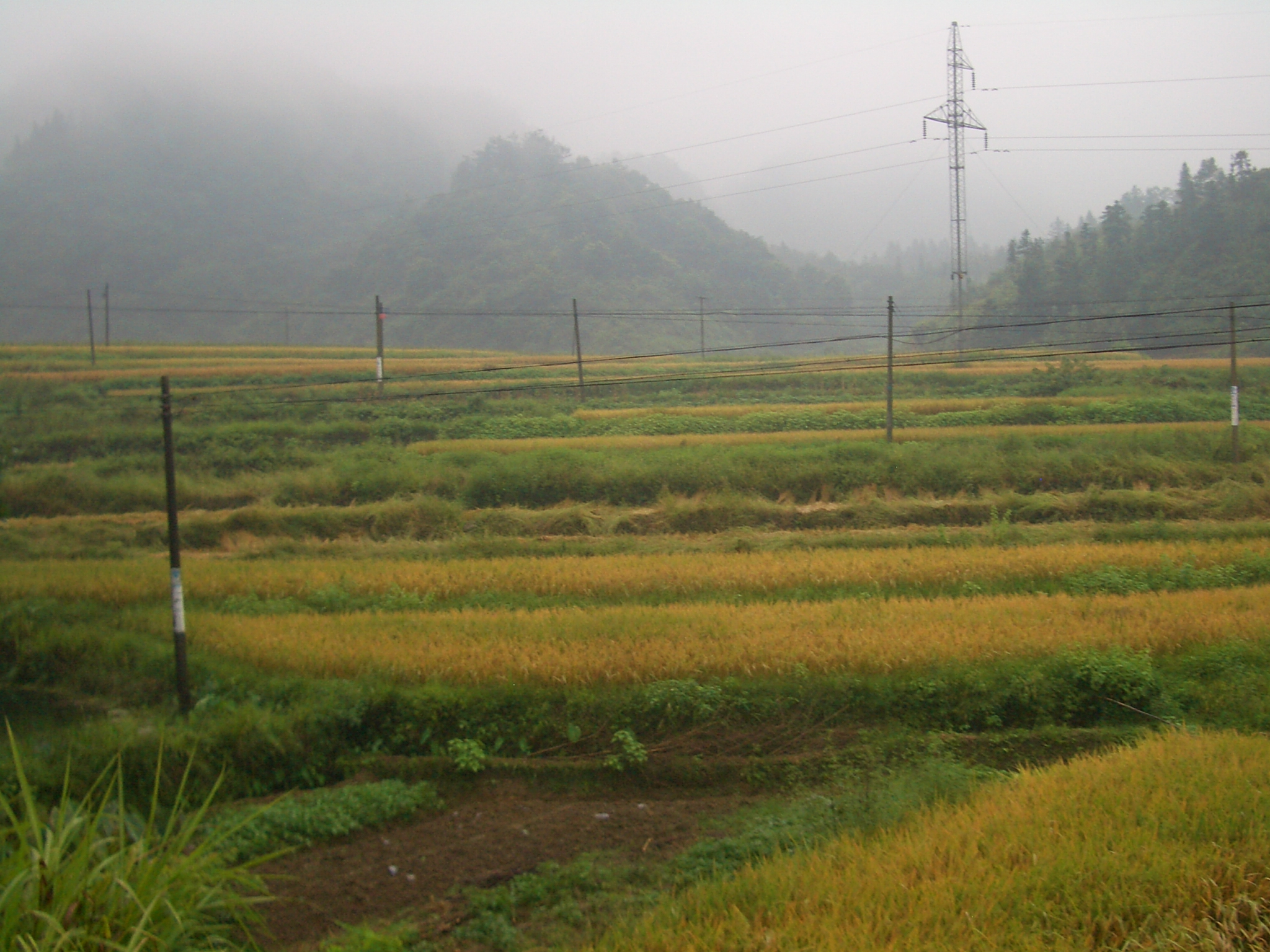
- Rice fields in Xian'an District

- Location in Hubei
- Coordinates (Xian'an District government): 29°51′10″N 114°17′55″E
- Country: China
- Province: Hubei
- Prefecture-level city: Xianning
- District seat: Yong'an Subdistrict

Area
  - Total: 1,503.08 km^{2} (580.34 sq mi)

Population (2020 census)
  - Total: 657,590
  - Density: 437.50/km^{2} (1,133.1/sq mi)
- Time zone: UTC+8 (China Standard)
- Website: www.xianan.gov.cn

Xian'an (Chinese: 咸安; pinyin: Xián'ān) is a district of the city of Xianning, Hubei, China.

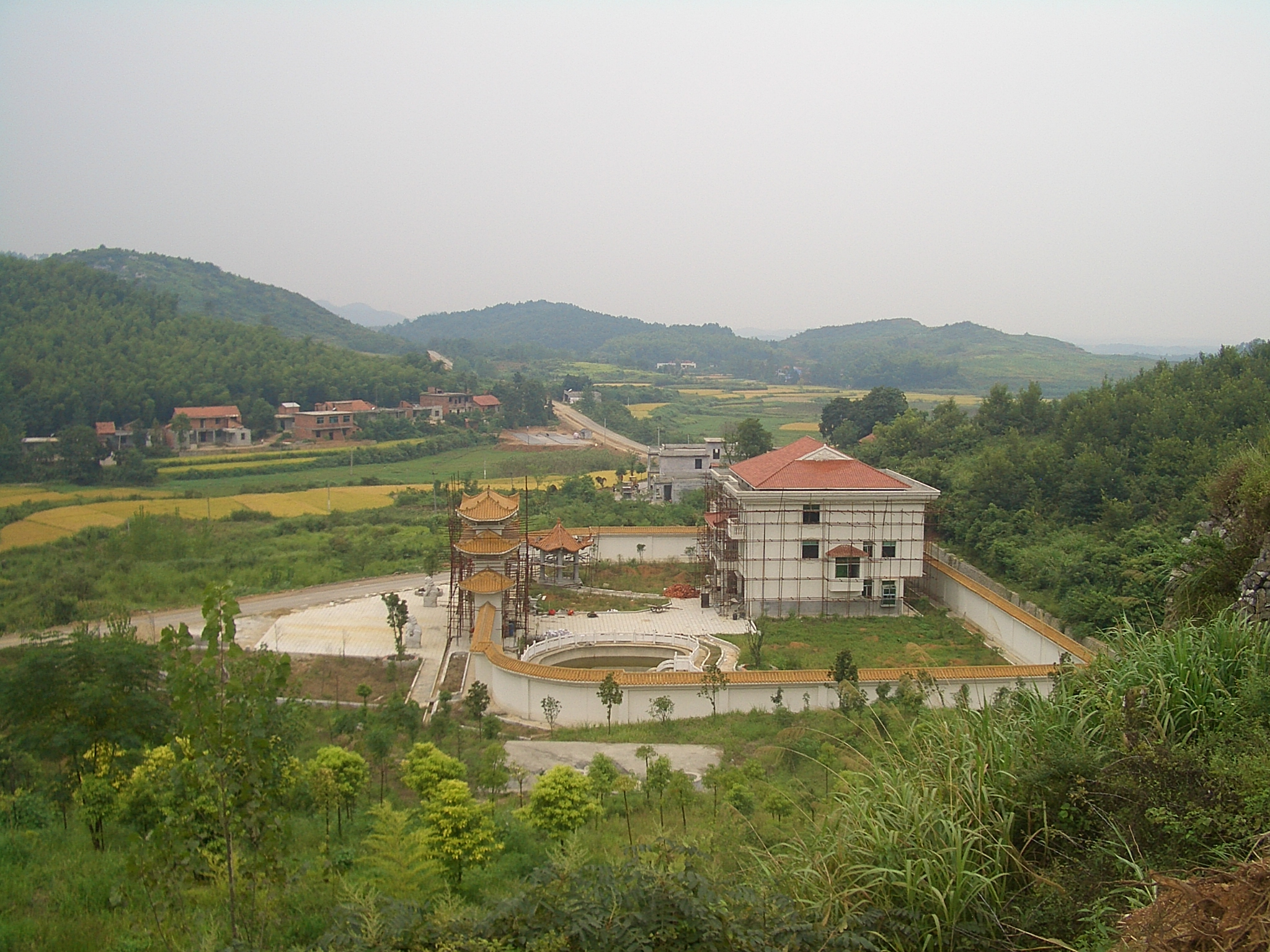
An "ancient temple" under construction

Xian'an District includes Xianning's central urban area (thus, it usually is not marked separately from Xianning on less detailed maps) and nearby villages.

== Administration ==
Xian'an District administers 3 subdistricts, 9 towns and 1 township:

3 subdistricts are: Wenquan Subdistrict (温泉街道), Fushan Subdistrict (浮山街道), Yong'an Subdistrict (永安街道)

9 towns are: Tingsiqiao (汀泗桥镇), Xiangyanghu (向阳湖镇), Guanbuqiao (官埠桥镇), Henggouqiao (横沟桥镇), Heshengqiao (贺胜桥镇), Shuangxiqiao (双溪桥镇), Maqiao (马桥镇), Guihua (桂花镇), Gaoqiao (高桥镇)

The only township is Damu Township (大幕乡)

Other areas: Xiangyanghu Dairy Breeding Farm (向阳湖奶牛良种场), Xian'an Commercial and Logistics Zone (咸安商贸物流区), Xianning Economic Development Zone (咸宁市经济技术开发区), Xian'an Economic Development Zone (湖北咸安经济技术开发区)

== Transportation ==
- Wuhan–Xianning Intercity Railway (Xianning East and Xianning South stations)
- Beijing-Guangzhou Railway (Xianning Station)
- Wuhan–Guangzhou High-Speed Railway (Xianning North Railway Station)

== Sights ==
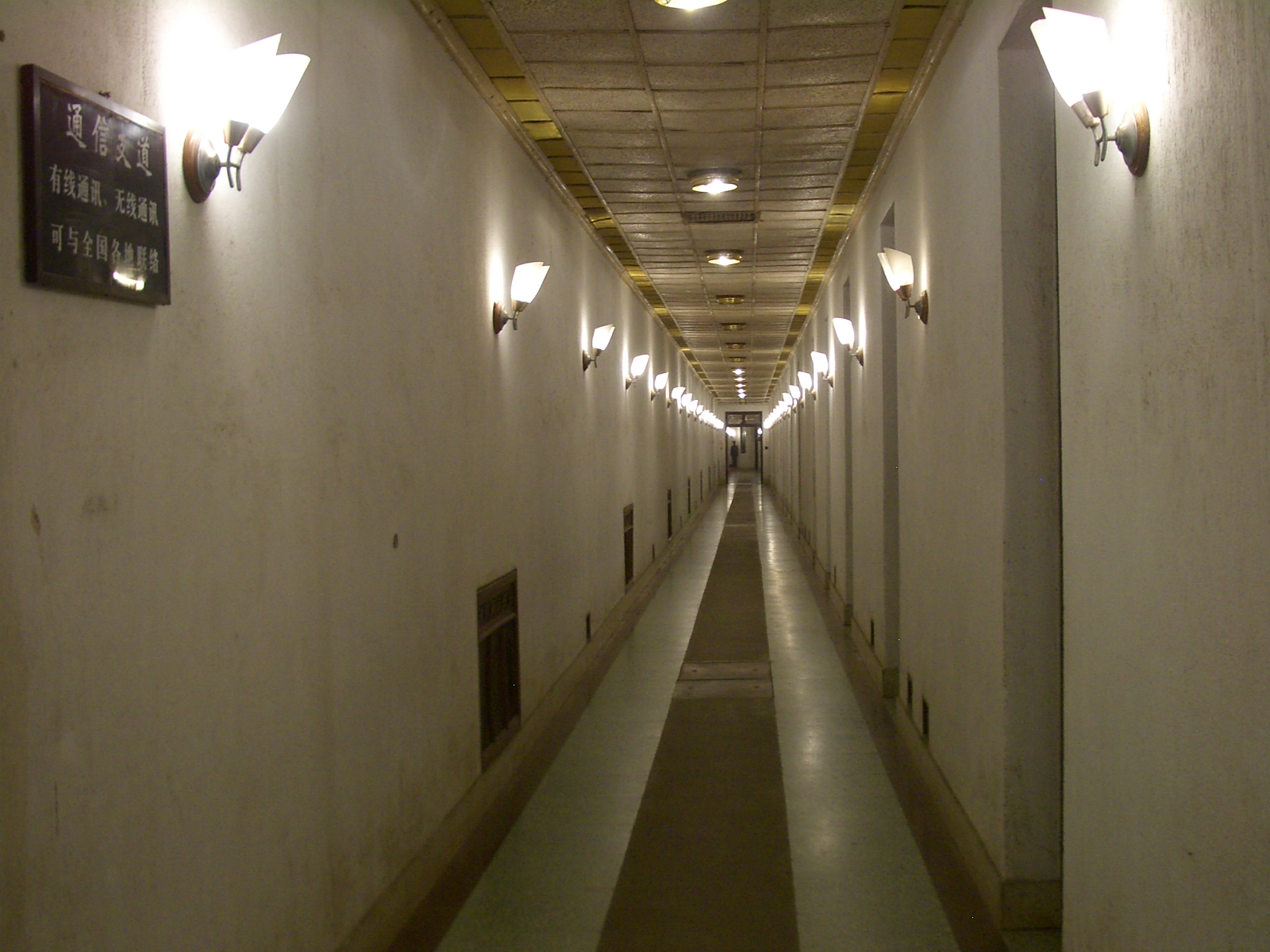
Underground...

At the "Underground Project 131" site, some 15 kilometres (9.3 mi) southeast of Xianning urban area, tourists can visit a system of tunnels that were built in 1969–71 to accommodate national military headquarters in the case of a war, but never used.
