= Wuhan–Xianning intercity railway =

Railway line in China

Overview
- Native name: 武咸城际铁路 武咸城际
- Status: Operational
- Owner: CR Wuhan
- Locale: Hubei province
- Termini: Wuchang; Xianning South
- Stations: 13

Service
- Type: High-speed railway
- System: China Railway High-speed
- Operator(s): CR Wuhan

History
- Opened: December 28, 2013

Technical
- Line length: 91 km (57 mi)
- Number of tracks: 2 (Double-track)
- Track gauge: 1,435 mm (4 ft 8 1/2 in) standard gauge
- Electrification: 25 kV 50 Hz AC (Overhead line)
- Operating speed: 350 km/h (220 mph) (Design); 250 km/h (160 mph) (Operational)

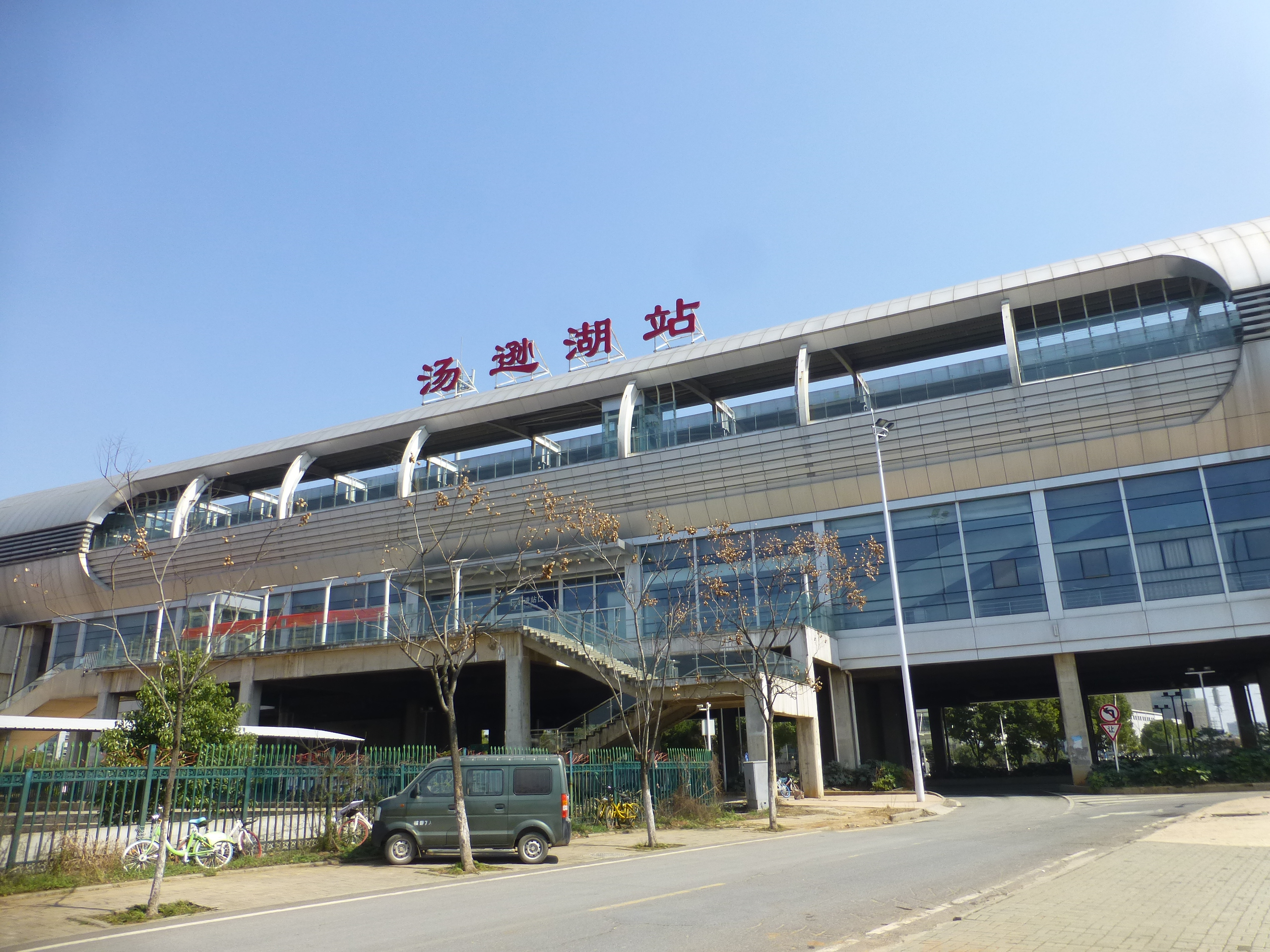
Tangxunhu railway station, an elevated station on the Wuhan–Xianning intercity railway. It serves the southwestern part of Wuhan's Guanggu development area, and has a transfer to the Guanggu (Optics Valley) tram line

The Wuhan–Xianning intercity railway (simplified Chinese: 武咸城际铁路; traditional Chinese: 武咸城際鐵路; pinyin: Wǔ-Xián Chéngjì Tiělù), commonly abbreviated as Wu-Xian intercity railway, is a high-speed commuter railway line in Hubei Province of China with double tracks. It connects the provincial capital Wuhan with the city of Xianning, with a number of intermediate stops throughout Wuhan's southern suburbs. The railway is part of Wuhan Metropolitan Area intercity railway system.

The railway line is 91.56 km (56.89 mi) long, and includes 13 stations, from Wuhan's Wuchang railway station to Xianning South railway station in Xianning. Intermediate stations is include Nanhu East railway station (in Wuhan's Guanggu area), several stations in Wuhan's suburban Jiangxia District and in Xianning City (Xian'an District).

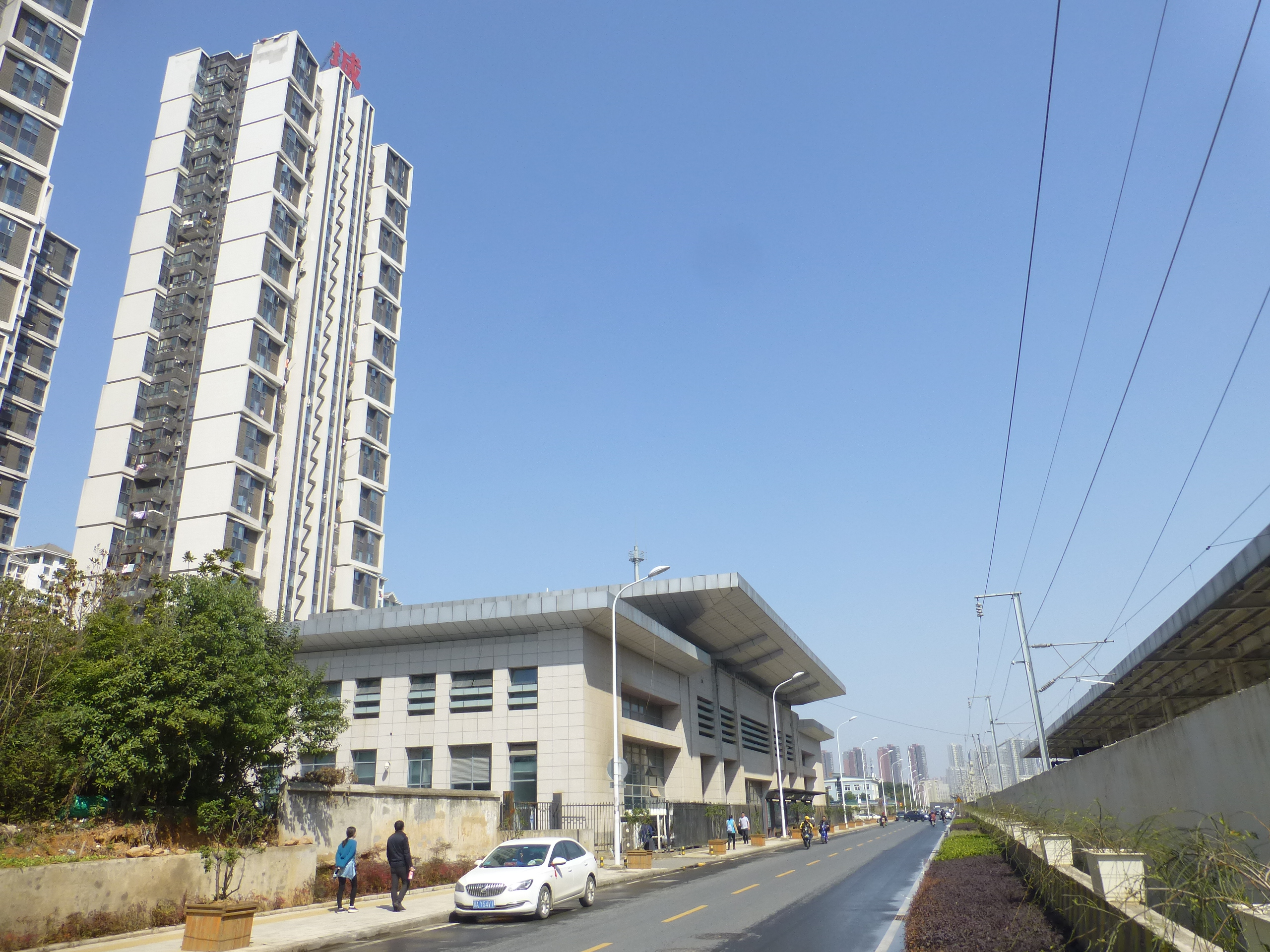
At Nanhu East railway station, the station building is across the street from the platforms, to which it is connected by an underground passageway

Although there are already two railway lines between Wuhan and Xianning (the Wuhan–Guangzhou high-speed railway and the older "conventional" Beijing–Guangzhou railway), the new railway is supposed to complement them, rather than compete with them. Unlike the Wuhan–Guangzhou high-speed railway, which has no passenger stations between Wuhan and Xianning, and the Xianning North railway station is somewhat out of town, the new intercity railway will serve a number of towns and township between the two city, and will have Xianning East railway station in downtown Xianning. Besides, the intercity line's terminal in Wuhan (the Wuchang railway station) is more convenient for most passengers than the Wuhan railway station used by the Wuhan–Guangzhou high-speed railway. As to the "conventional" Beijing–Guangzhou railway, its trains are much slower and aren't frequent, since that railway's capacity is now mainly used for freight or long distance passenger services.

The travel time between Wuchang and Xianning on the intercity railway (28 min) will be only a few minutes longer than the one the Wuhan–Guangzhou high-speed railway, while the fare will be somewhat lower.

The railway began operation on December 28, 2013 with 10 services each direction per day.

At Tangxunhu railway station, transfer is available to the Optics Valley (Guanggu) Line of Wuhan Tram.
