= Xianning North railway station =

Railway station in Xianning, Hubei, China

Xianning North 咸宁北
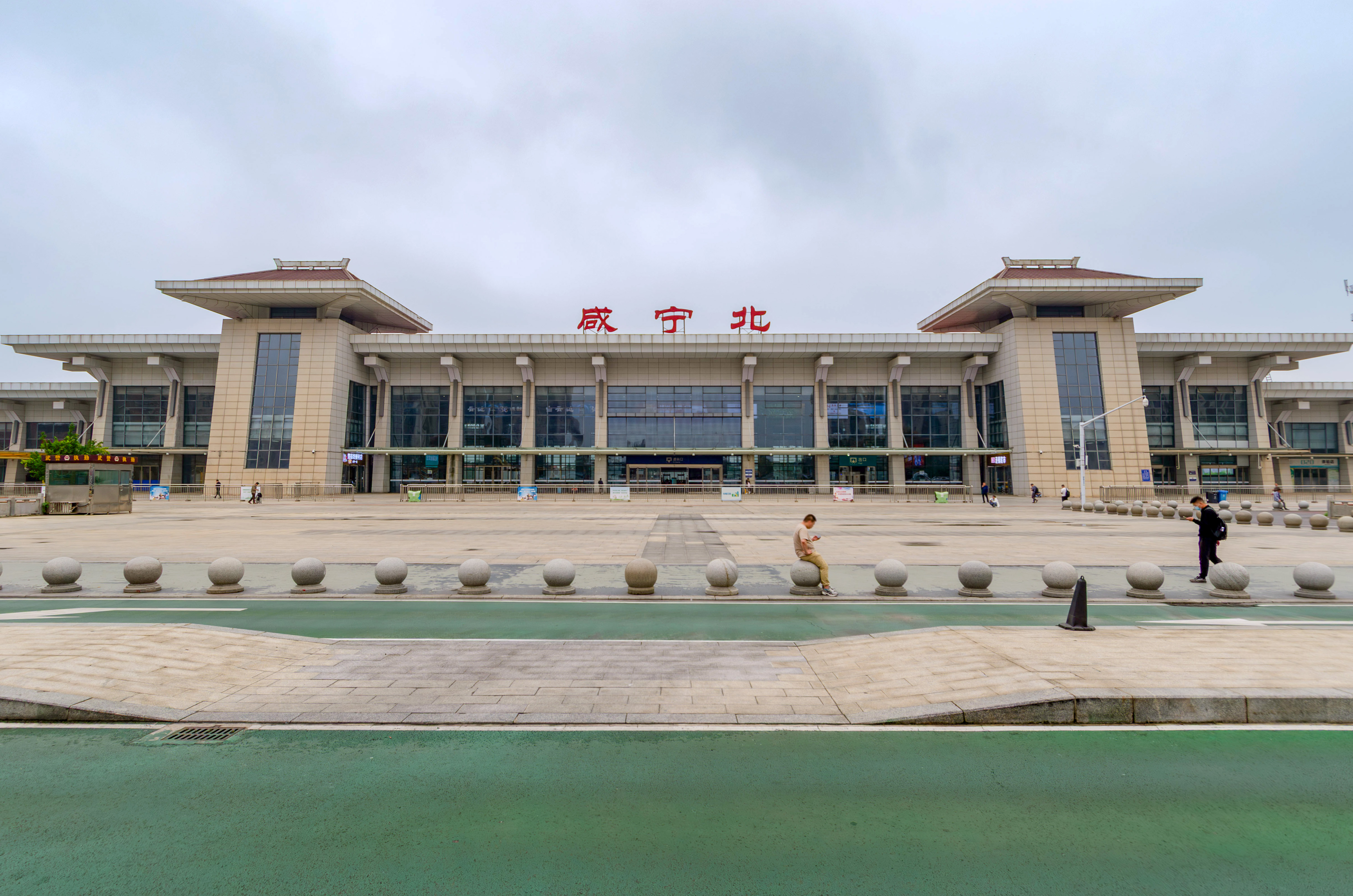
- The exterior of Xianning North railway station

General information
- Other names: Xianningbei
- Location: Duchuan Village (渡船村), Guanbuqiao, Xian'an District, Xianning, Hubei; China
- Coordinates: 29°54′06″N 114°17′44″E
- Operated by: Wuhan Railway Bureau
- Line: Wuhan–Guangzhou high-speed railway

Other information
- Station code: IATA: IUO; TMIS code: 65806; Telegraph code: XRN; Pinyin code: XNB
- Classification: 2nd class station

History
- Opened: 2009
Location

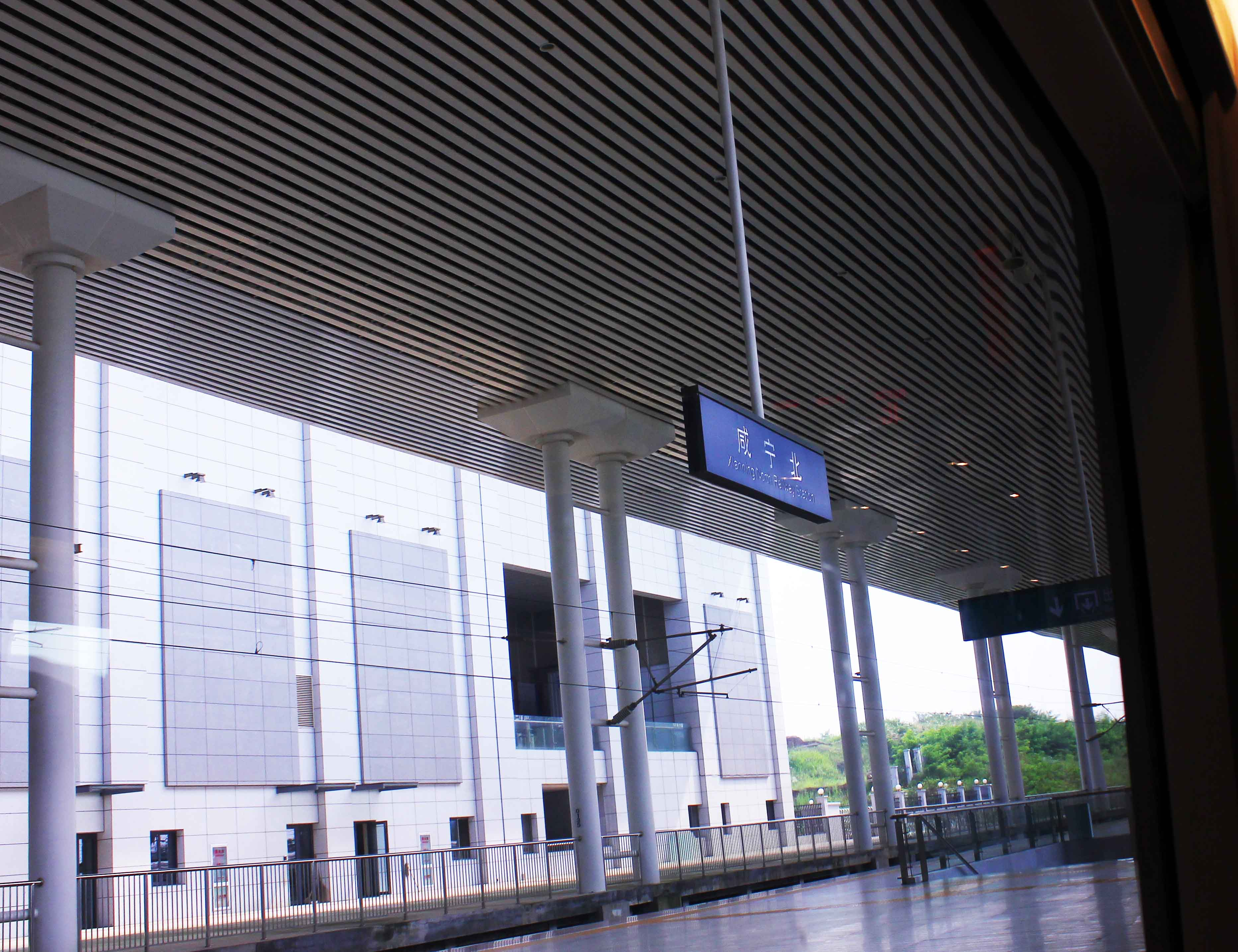
Platform 1 of Xianning North railway station

Xianning North railway station (simplified Chinese: 咸宁北站; traditional Chinese: 咸寧北站; pinyin: Xiánníng Běi Zhàn) is a railway station on the Wuhan–Guangzhou high-speed railway. The station is located on the northern edge of Xianning's urban core, in Guanbuqiao of Xian'an District, Xianning, Hubei Province, China.

== Other stations in Xianning ==
The station on the conventional Beijing–Guangzhou railway is known as Xianning railway station. It is located about 2 km from Xianning North.

The name "Xianning North railway station" was also used in early design documents for the station of the Wuchang–Xianning intercity railway. By the time of the opening of the railway in late 2013, that station renamed to Xianning East railway station.

Preceding station	China Railway High-speed	Following station
Wulongquan East towards Wuhan	Wuhan–Guangzhou high-speed railway	Chibi North towards Guangzhou South
